= Trompe-l'œil =

Art technique of illusory tridimensionality

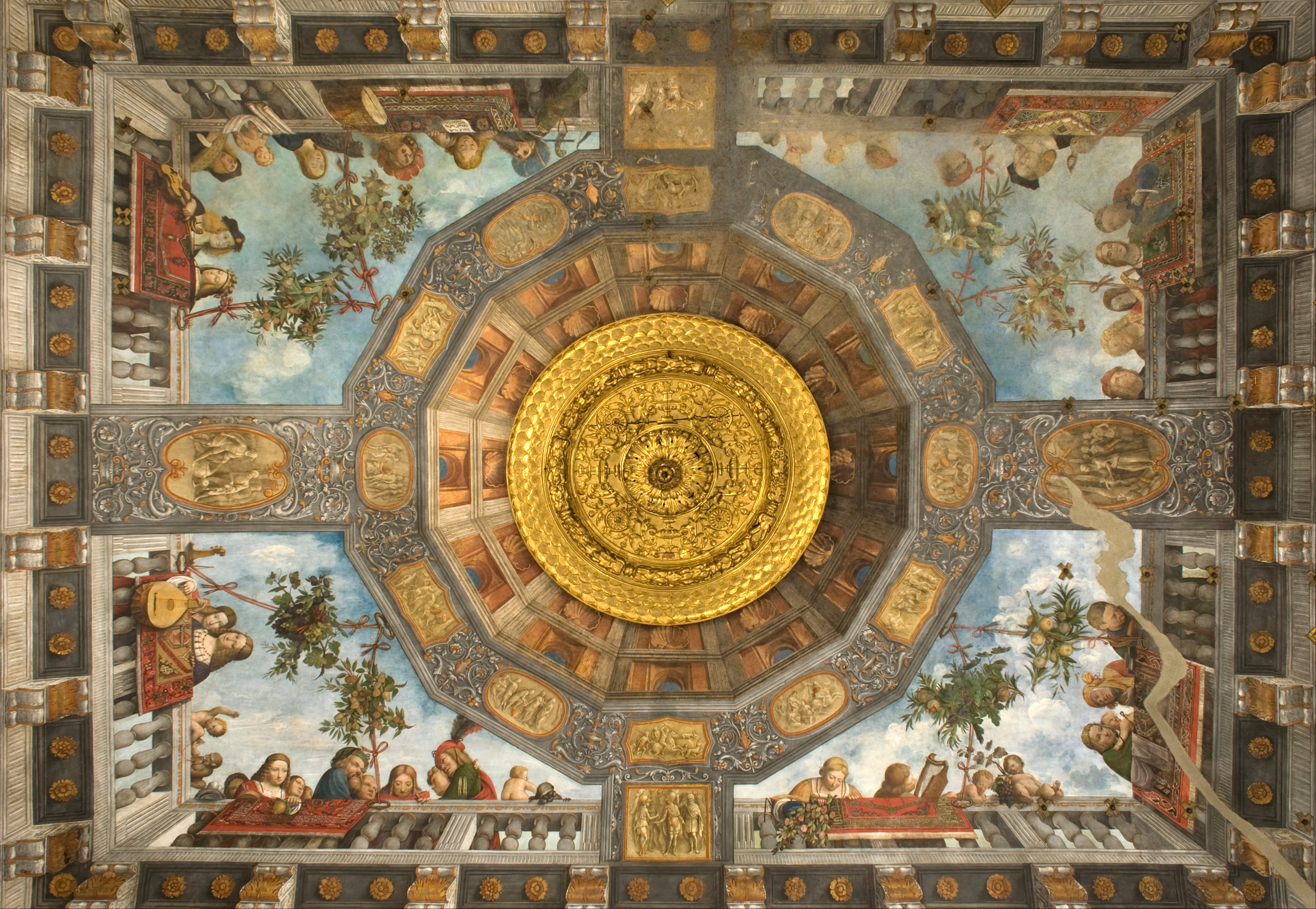
Ceiling of the Treasure Room of the Archaeological Museum of Ferrara, Italy, painted in 1503–1506

Trompe-l'œil (French for 'deceive the eye'; /trɒmpˈlɔɪ/ tromp-LOY; French: [tʁɔ̃p lœj]) is an artistic technique that creates a highly realistic optical illusion of three-dimensional space and objects on a two-dimensional surface. Trompe-l'œil, which is most often associated with painting, tricks the viewer into perceiving painted objects or spaces as real. Forced perspective is a related illusion in architecture, and Op art is a modern style mostly dealing with geometric patterns. Trompe-l'œil has also been used as a term for analogous illusions and deceptions in literature, including those which create a frustrated interpretive expectation or mirror a character's experience through literary structure.

== History in painting ==
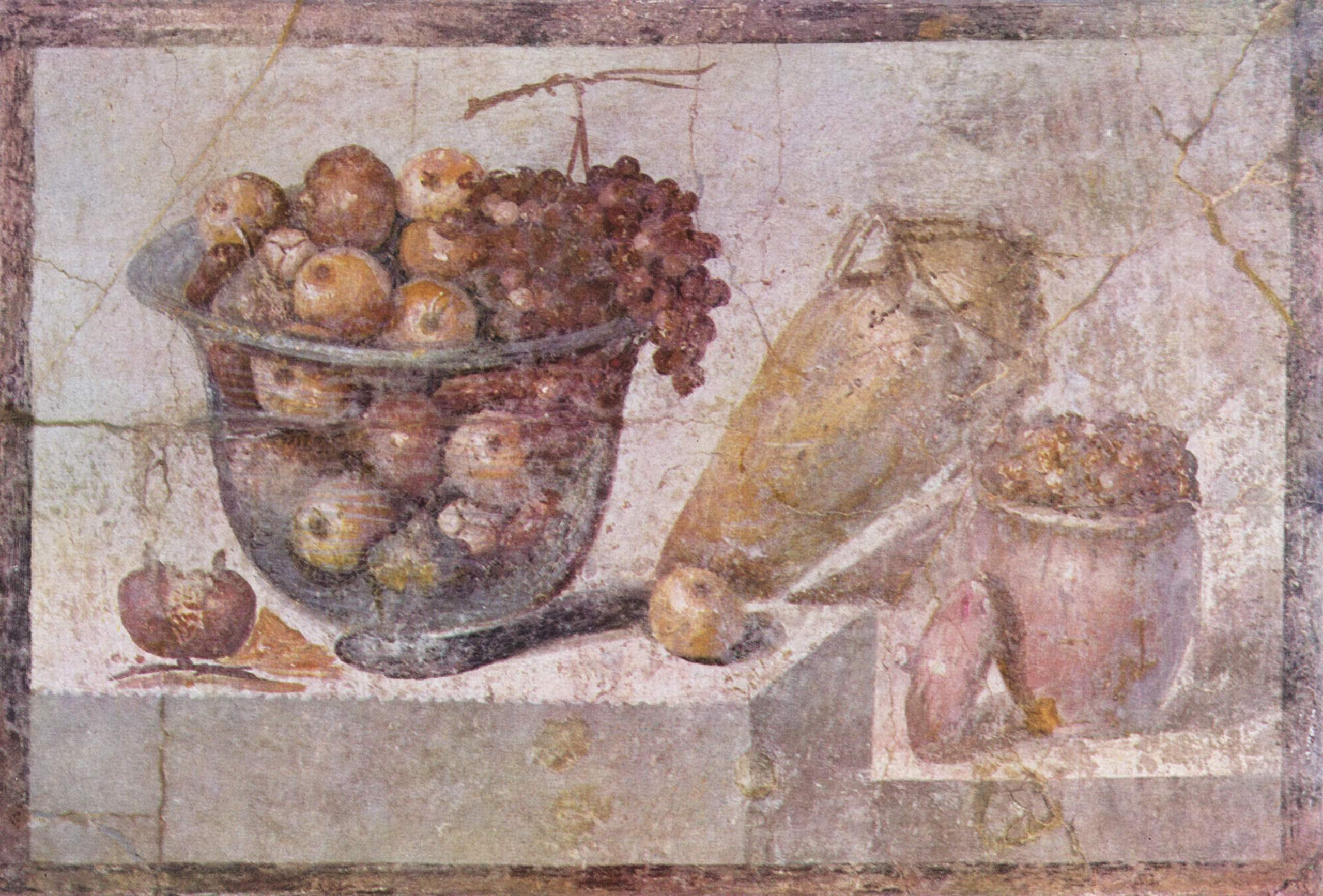
Still life, Pompeii, c. AD 70

The phrase, which can also be spelled without the hyphen and ligature in English as trompe l'oeil, originates with the artist Louis-Léopold Boilly, who used it as the title of a painting he exhibited in the Paris Salon of 1800. Although the term gained currency only in the early 19th century, the illusionistic technique associated with trompe-l'œil dates much further back. It was (and is) often employed in murals. Instances from ancient Greece and Rome are known, for instance in Pompeii. A typical trompe-l'œil mural might depict a window, door, or hallway, intended to suggest a larger room.

A version of an oft-told ancient Greek story concerns a contest between two renowned painters. Zeuxis (born around 464 BC) produced a still life painting so convincing that birds flew down to peck at the painted grapes. A rival, Parrhasius, asked Zeuxis to judge one of his paintings that was behind a pair of tattered curtains in his study. Parrhasius asked Zeuxis to pull back the curtains, but when Zeuxis tried, he could not, as the curtains were included in Parrhasius's painting—making Parrhasius the winner.

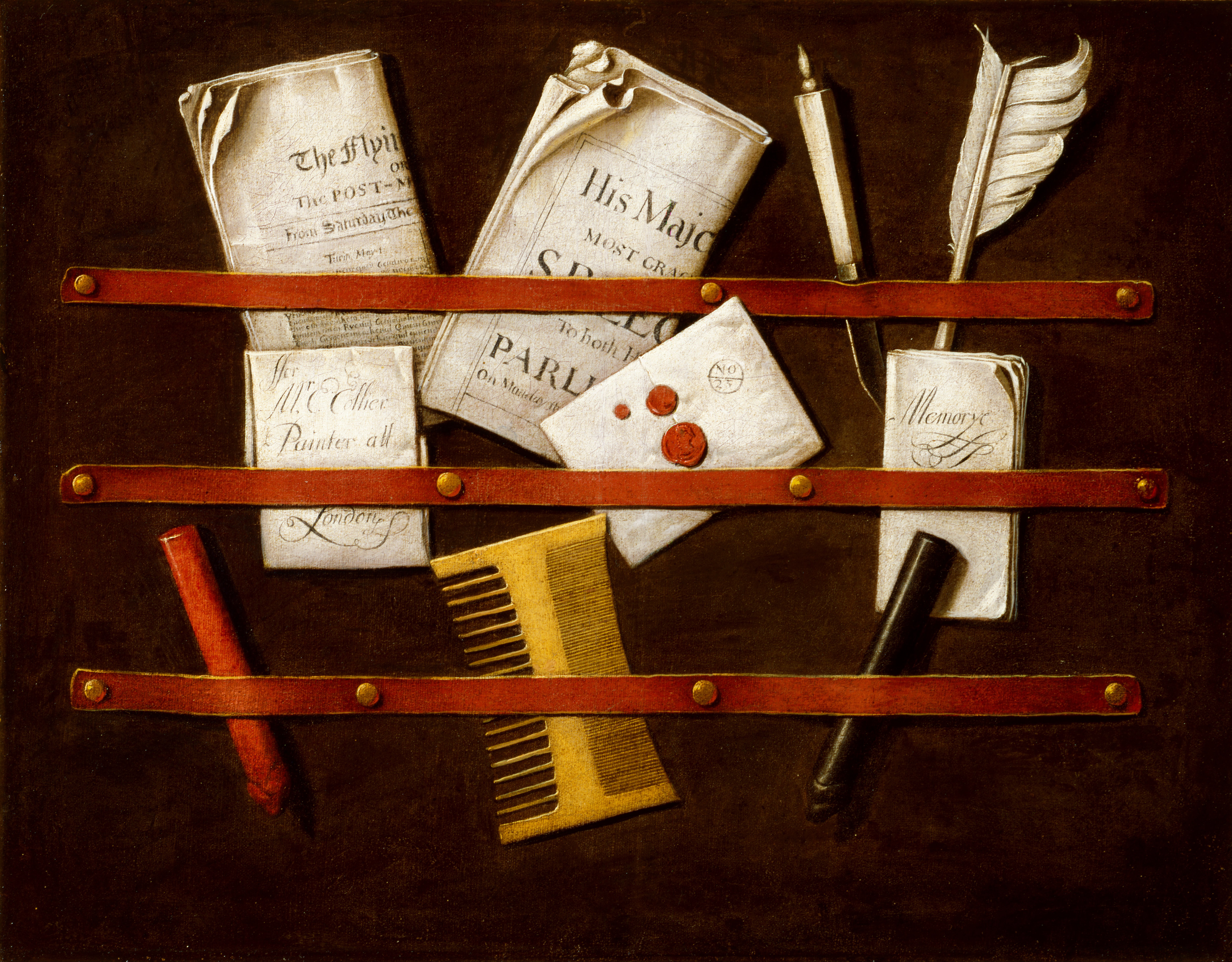
Trompe l'œil with Writing Materials by the Dutch painter Evert Collier

== Perspective ==
A fascination with perspective drawing arose during the Renaissance. Giotto had begun using perspective at the end of the 13th century with the cycle of Assisi in Saint Francis stories. Many Italian painters of the late Quattrocento, such as Andrea Mantegna (1431–1506) and Melozzo da Forlì (1438–1494), began painting illusionistic ceiling paintings, generally in fresco, that employed perspective and techniques such as foreshortening to create the impression of greater space for the viewer below. This type of trompe-l'œil illusionism as specifically applied to ceiling paintings is known as di sotto in sù, meaning "from below, upward" in Italian. The elements above the viewer are rendered as if viewed from true vanishing point perspective. Well-known examples are the Camera degli Sposi in Mantua and Antonio da Correggio's (1489–1534) Assumption of the Virgin in the Parma Cathedral.

Similarly, Vittorio Carpaccio (1460–1525) and Jacopo de' Barbari (c. 1440 – before 1516) added small trompe-l'œil features to their paintings, playfully exploring the boundary between image and reality. For example, a painted fly might appear to be sitting on the painting's frame, or a curtain might appear to partly conceal the painting, a piece of paper might appear to be attached to a board, or a person might appear to be climbing out of the painting altogether—all in reference to the contest of Zeuxis and Parrhasius.

== Quadratura ==
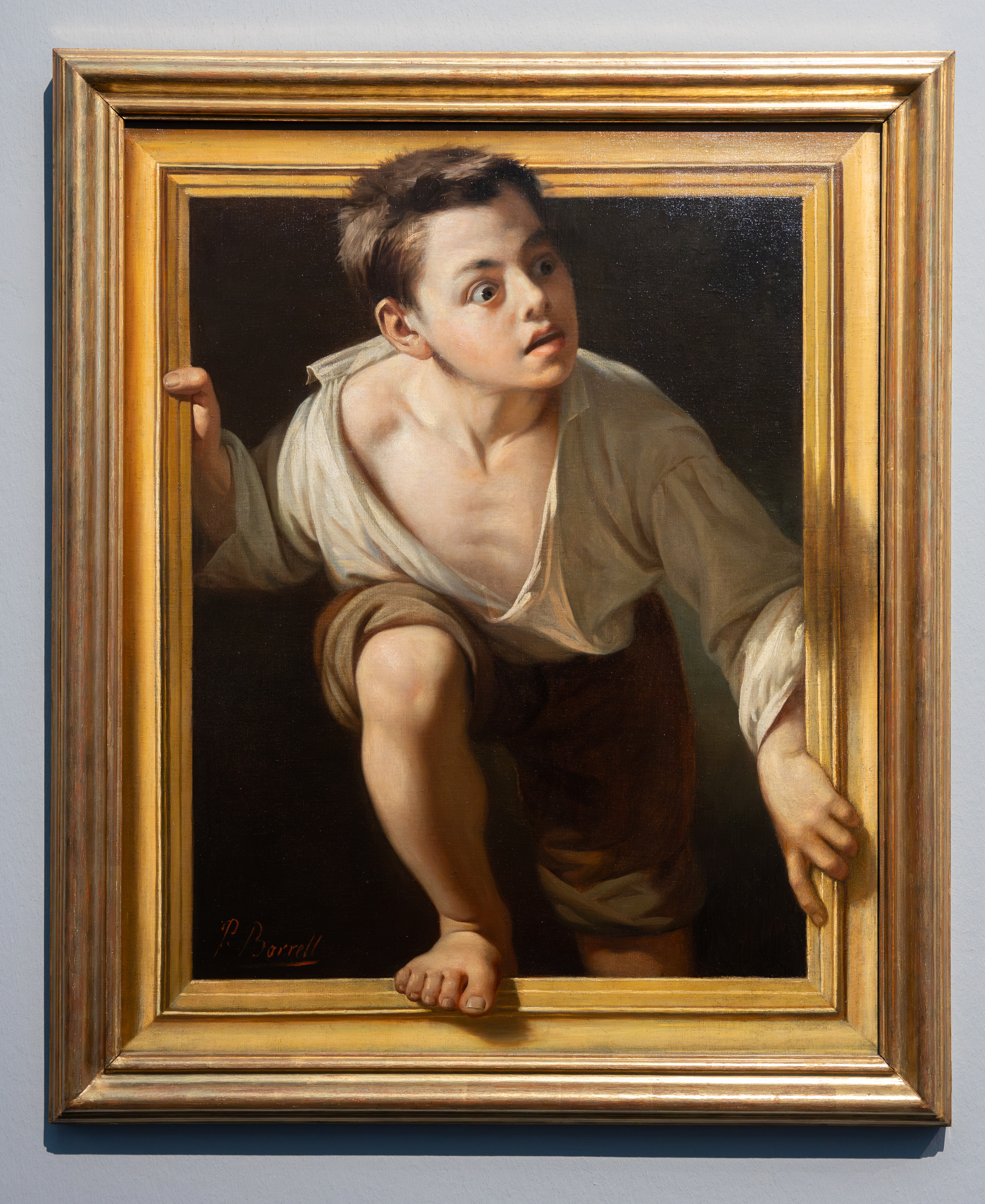
Escaping Criticism by Pere Borrell del Caso, 1874

Perspective theories in the 17th century allowed a more fully integrated approach to architectural illusion, which when used by painters to "open up" the space of a wall or ceiling is known as quadratura. Examples include Pietro da Cortona's Allegory of Divine Providence in the Palazzo Barberini and Andrea Pozzo's Apotheosis of St Ignatius on the ceiling of the Roman church of Sant'Ignazio in Campo Marzio.

The Mannerist and Baroque style interiors of Jesuit churches in the 16th and 17th centuries often included such trompe-l'œil ceiling paintings, which optically "open" the ceiling or dome to the heavens with a depiction of Jesus', Mary's, or a saint's ascension or assumption. An example of a perfect architectural trompe-l'œil is the illusionistic dome in the Jesuit church, Vienna, by Andrea Pozzo, which is only slightly curved, but gives the impression of true architecture.

Trompe-l'œil paintings became very popular in Flemish and later in Dutch painting in the 17th century arising from the development of still life painting. The Flemish painter Cornelis Norbertus Gysbrechts created a chantourné painting showing an easel holding a painting. Chantourné literally means 'cutout' and refers to a trompe-l'œil representation designed to stand away from a wall. The Dutch painter Samuel Dirksz van Hoogstraten was a master of the trompe-l'œil and theorized on the role of art as the lifelike imitation of nature in his 1678 book, the Introduction to the Academy of Painting, or the Visible World (Inleyding tot de hooge schoole der schilderkonst: anders de zichtbaere werelt, Rotterdam, 1678).

A fanciful form of architectural trompe-l'œil, quodlibet, features realistically rendered paintings of such items as paper knives, playing cards, ribbons, and scissors, apparently accidentally left lying around.

Trompe-l'œil can also be found painted on tables and other items of furniture, on which, for example, a deck of playing cards might appear to be sitting on the table. A particularly impressive example can be seen at Chatsworth House in Derbyshire, where one of the internal doors appears to have a violin and bow suspended from it, in a trompe-l'œil painted around 1723 by Jan van der Vaart. Another example can be found in the Painted Hall at the Old Royal Naval College, Greenwich, London. This Wren building was painted by Sir James Thornhill, the first British born painter to be knighted and is a classic example of the Baroque style popular in the early 18th century. The American 19th-century still-life painter William Harnett specialized in trompe-l'œil.

In the 20th century, from the 1960s on, the American Richard Haas and many others painted large trompe-l'œil murals on the sides of city buildings. From the beginning of the 1980s when German artist Rainer Maria Latzke began to combine classical fresco art with contemporary content, trompe-l'œil became increasingly popular for interior murals. The Spanish painter Salvador Dalí utilized the technique for a number of his paintings.

== In other art forms ==
Trompe-l'œil, in the form of "forced perspective", has long been used in stage-theater set design, so as to create the illusion of a much deeper space than the existing stage. A famous early example is the Teatro Olimpico in Vicenza, with Vincenzo Scamozzi's seven forced-perspective "streets" (1585), which appear to recede into the distance.

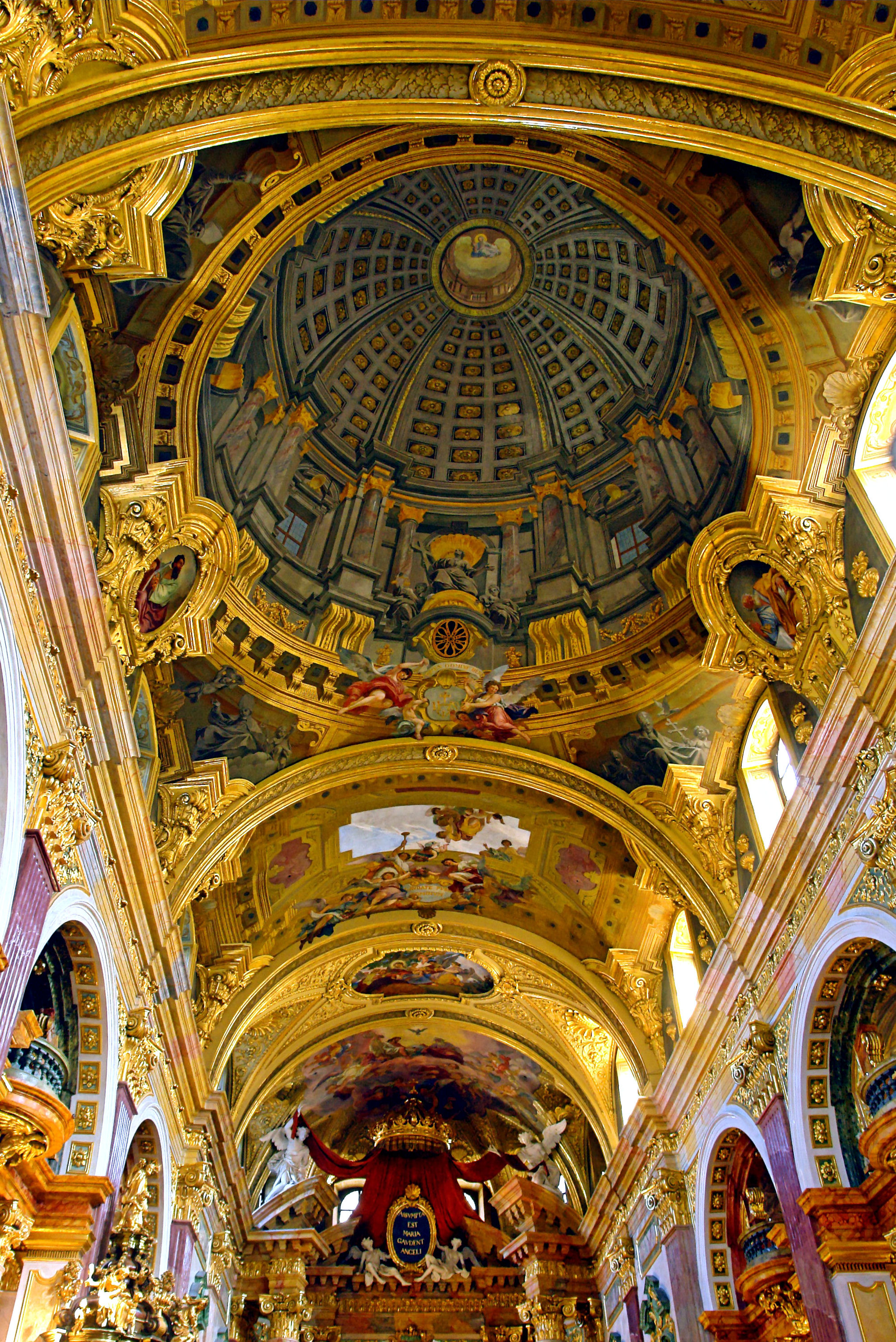
Fresco with trompe l'œil dome painted on low vaulting, Jesuit Church, Vienna, Austria, by Andrea Pozzo, 1703

Trompe-l'œil is employed in Donald O'Connor's famous "Running up the wall" scene in the film Singin' in the Rain (1952). During the finale of his "Make 'em Laugh" number he first runs up a real wall. Then he runs towards what appears to be a hallway, but when he runs up this as well we realize that it is a large trompe-l'œil mural. More recently, Roy Andersson has made use of similar techniques in his feature films.

Matte painting is a variant of trompe-l'œil, and is used in film production with elements of a scene are painted on glass panels mounted in front of the camera.

Elsa Schiaparelli frequently made use of trompe-l'œil in her designs, most famously perhaps in her Bowknot Sweater, which some consider to be the first use of trompe-l'œil in fashion. The Tears Dress, which she did in collaboration with Salvador Dalí, features both appliqué tears on the veil and trompe-l'œil tears on the dress itself.

Fictional trompe-l'œil appears in many Looney Tunes, such as the Road Runner cartoons, where, for example, Wile E. Coyote paints a tunnel on a rock wall, and Road Runner then races through the fake tunnel. This is usually followed by the coyote's foolishly trying to run through the tunnel after the road runner, only to smash into the hard rock-face. This sight gag was employed in Who Framed Roger Rabbit.

In Chicago's Near North Side, Richard Haas used a 16-story 1929 apartment hotel converted into a 1981 apartment building for trompe-l'œil murals in homage to Chicago school architecture. One of the building's sides features the Chicago Board of Trade Building, intended as a reflection of the building located two miles south.

Several contemporary artists use chalk on pavement or sidewalk to create trompe-l'œil works, a technique called street painting or "pavement art". These creations last only until washed away, and therefore must be photographed to be preserved. Practitioners of this form include Julian Beever, Edgar Mueller, Leon Keer, and Kurt Wenner.

The Palazzo Salis of Tirano, Italy, has over centuries and throughout the palace used trompe-l'œil in place of more expensive real masonry, doors, staircases, balconies, and draperies to create an illusion of sumptuousness and opulence.

Trompe-l'œil in the form of illusion architecture and Lüftlmalerei is common on façades in the Alpine region.

Trompe-l'œil, in the form of "illusion painting", is also used in contemporary interior design, where illusionary wall paintings experienced a renaissance since around 1980. Significant artists in this field are the German muralist Rainer Maria Latzke, who invented, in the 1990s, a new method of producing illusion paintings, frescography, and the English artist Graham Rust.

OK Go's music video for "The Writing's on the Wall" uses a number of trompe-l'œil illusions alongside other optical illusions, captured through a one-shot take. Trompe-l'œil illusions have been used as gameplay mechanics in video games such as The Witness and Superliminal.

Japanese filmmaker and animator Isao Takahata regarded achieving a sense of trompe-l'œil to be important for his work, stating that an animated world should feel as if it "existed right there" so that "people believe in a fantasy world and characters that no one has seen in reality."

Tourist attractions employing large-scale illusory art allowing visitors to photograph themselves in fantastic scenes have opened in several Asian countries, such as the Trickeye Museum and Hong Kong 3D Museum. Recently a Trick Art Museum opened in Europe and uses more photographic approaches.

=== In literature ===
Critics and scholars have used trompe-l'œil as a descriptor of literary illusions or deceptions that create a sense of immersion or manipulate the reader's expectations in a fashion roughly analogous to visual trompe-l'œil. In one instance, British literary critic Catherine Belsey defined the usage of trompe-l'œil in William Shakespeare's Venus and Adonis as a deception that tantalizes the subject by failing to deliver something apparently present. Belsey differentiated this usage between a literal description of Zeuxis's painted grapes, a description of the central tension between Adonis' appearance and absent desire, and crucially the structural lack of closure on the poem's theme of love. Belsey described this last interaction, where the poem withholds from the reader a seemingly promised argument on the nature of love, as a literary trompe-l'œil.

In a 2012 monograph concerning the literature of Wilhelm Hauff, Stefania Acciaioli posited that the veiling of ironic societal criticism behind a conforming cultural model is a form of literary trompe-l'œil. Acciaioli described Hauff's märchen as utilising a "double texture", wherein works which are ostensibly conventional fairy-tales are underlaid with ironic subtext that challenged convention. That is, while visual trompe-l'œil presents a two-dimensional work as a conventional three-dimensional space, Hauff presents an ironic commentary as a conventional story.

== Artists ==
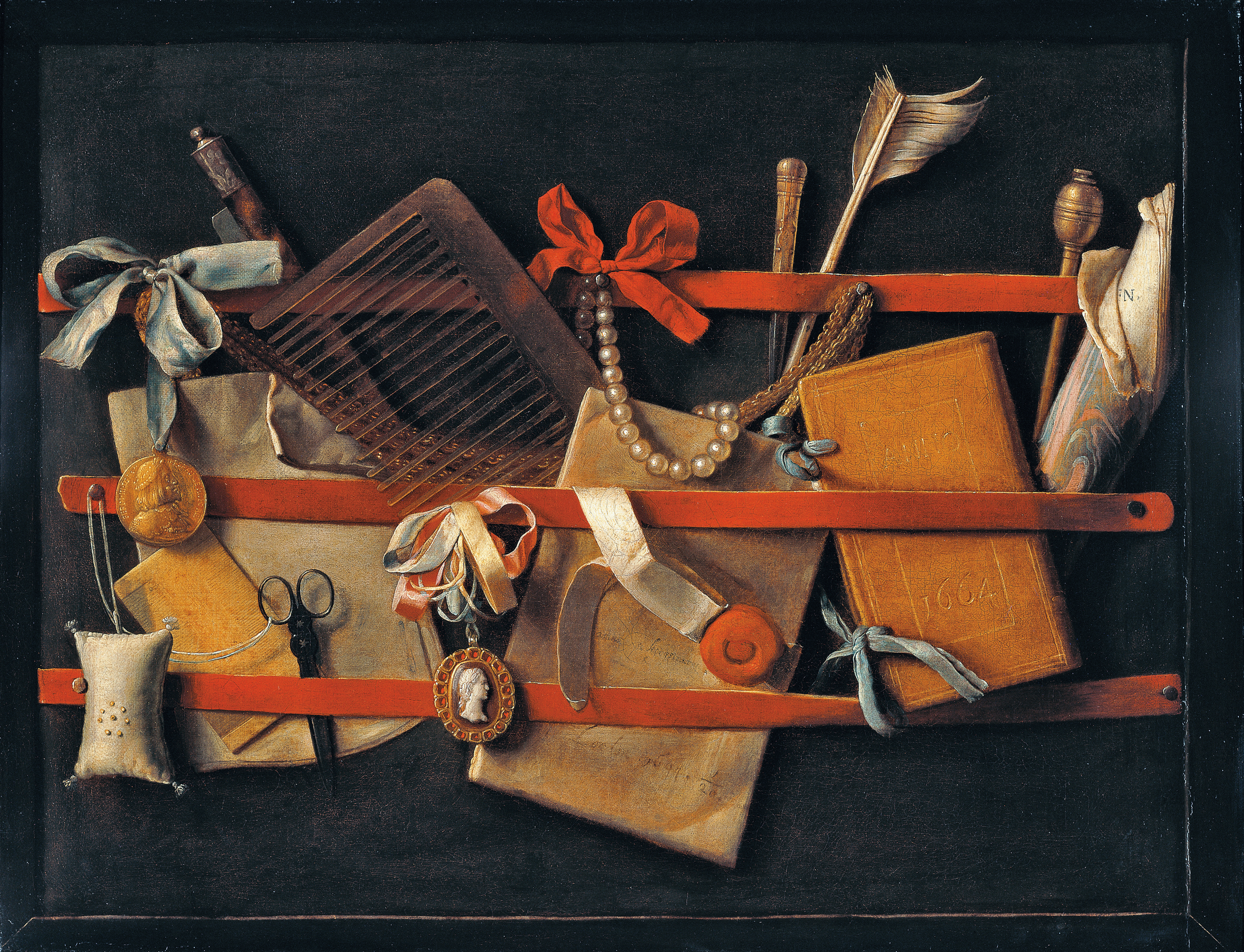
Trompe-l'œil Still-Life by Samuel Dirksz van Hoogstraten (1627–1678); 1664

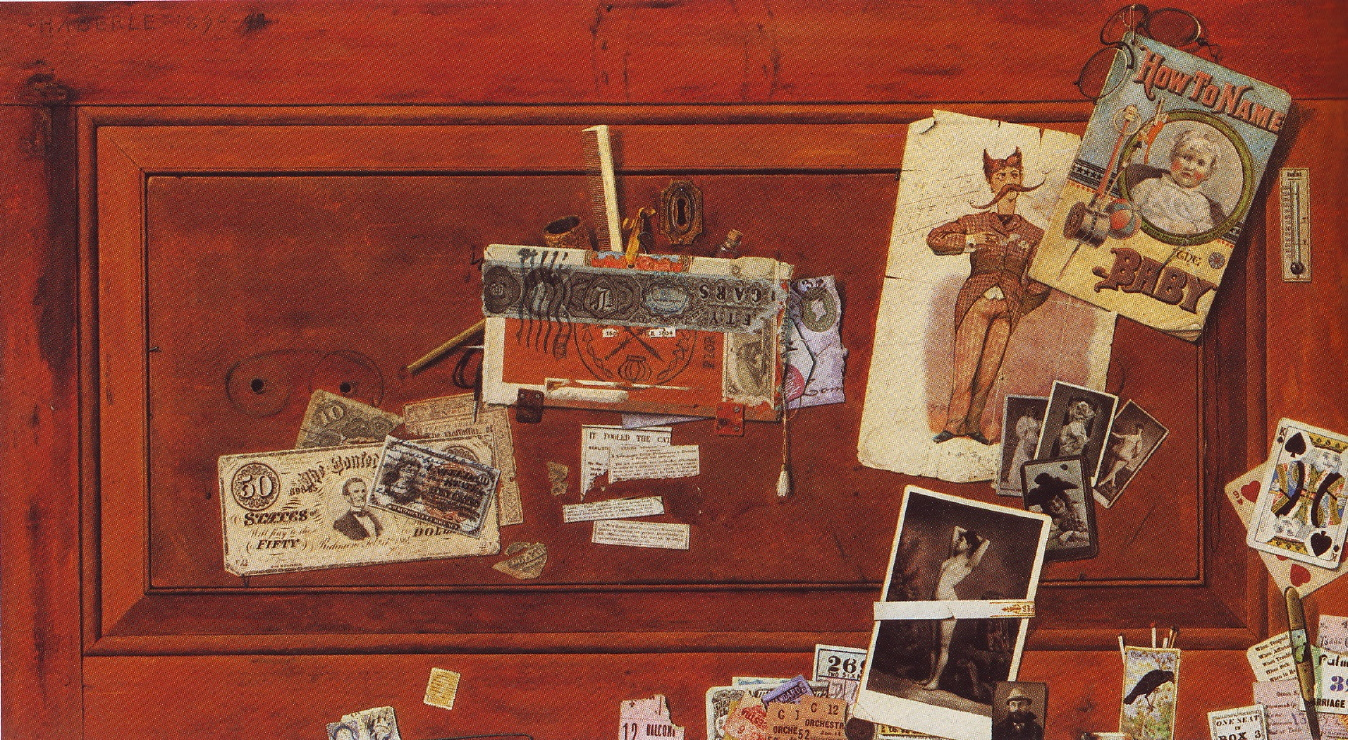
A Bachelor's Drawer by John Haberle (1890–1894)

Old Masters

- Cornelis Biltius
- Jacob Biltius
- Donato Bramante
- Petrus Christus
- Antonio da Correggio
- Carlo Crivelli
- Luca Giordano
- Cornelis Norbertus Gysbrechts
- Franciscus Gijsbrechts
- Samuel Dirksz van Hoogstraten
- Andrea Mantegna
- Masaccio
- Jean-Francois de la Motte
- Charles Willson Peale
- Jacobus Plasschaert
- Andrea Pozzo
- Vincenzo Scamozzi
- Giovanni Battista Tiepolo

19th century and modern masters

- Henry Alexander
- Aaron Bohrod
- Louis-Léopold Boilly
- Salvador Dalí
- Walter Goodman
- John Haberle
- William Harnett
- Claude Raguet Hirst
- René Magritte
- John F. Peto

Contemporary

- Ellen Altfest
- Martin Battersby
- Julian Beever
- Daniela Benedini
- Henri Bol
- Henri Cadiou
- Dan Colen
- Piero Fornasetti
- Ronald Francis
- Joanne Gair
- Frederic Gracia
- Richard Haas
- Jonty Hurwitz
- Lorena Kloosterboer
- Rainer Maria Latzke
- Attila Meszlenyi
- István Orosz (Utisz)
- Os Gêmeos, "The Twins"
- Jacques Poirier
- Susan Powers
- John Pugh
- Pierre-Marie Rudelle
- Graham Rust
- Gavin Turk
- Anthony Waichulis
- Kurt Wenner
- Raymond A. Whyte
- Tavar Zawacki

== Paintings ==
Examples of trompe-l'œil paintings

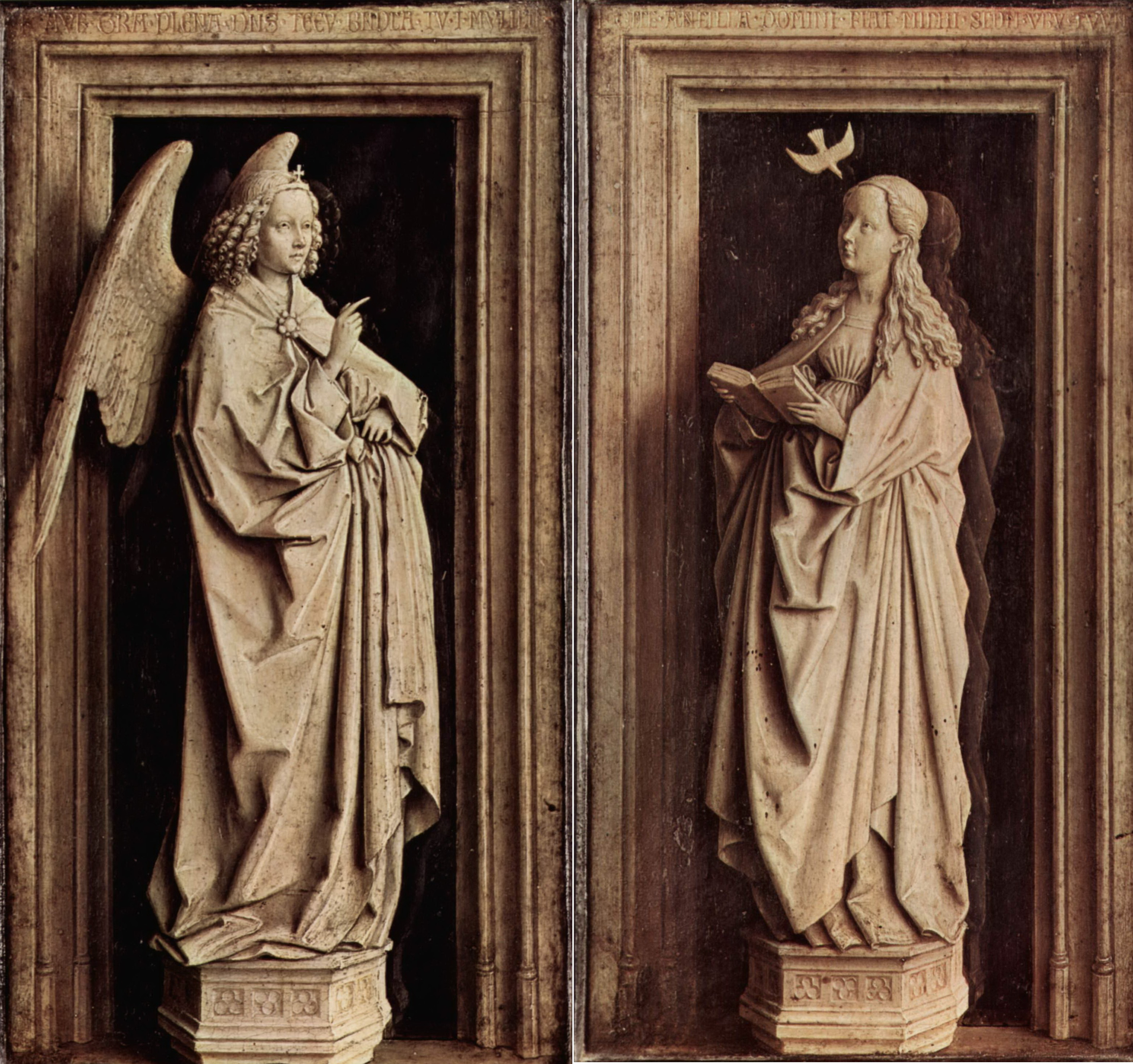
The Annunciation Diptych by Jan van Eyck, detail (c. 1433–1435)

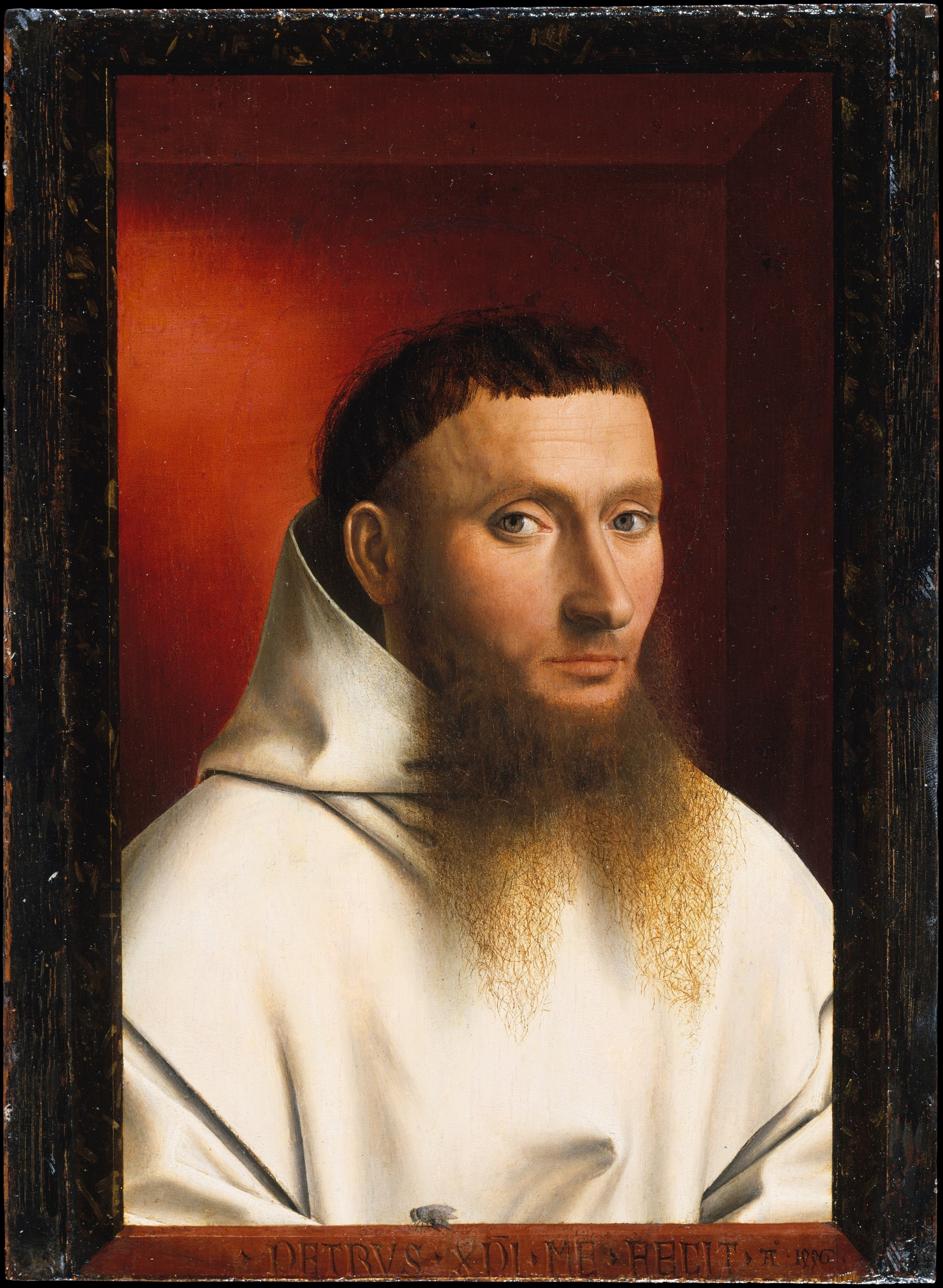
Portrait of a Carthusian by Petrus Christus (1446); note the fly near the bottom

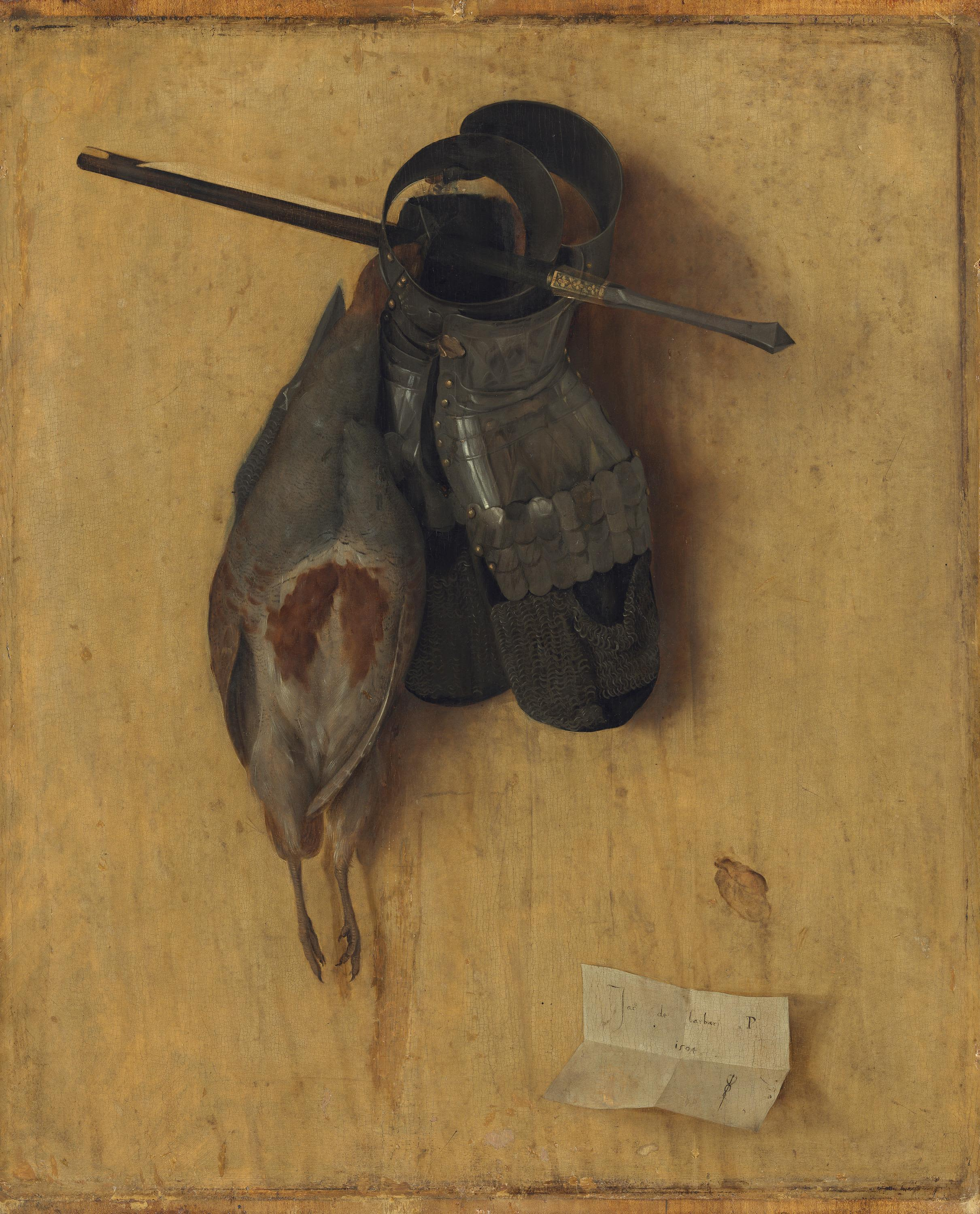
Still-Life with Partridge and Gauntlets by Jacopo de' Barbari, 1504; the first still-life trompe-l'œil since antiquity

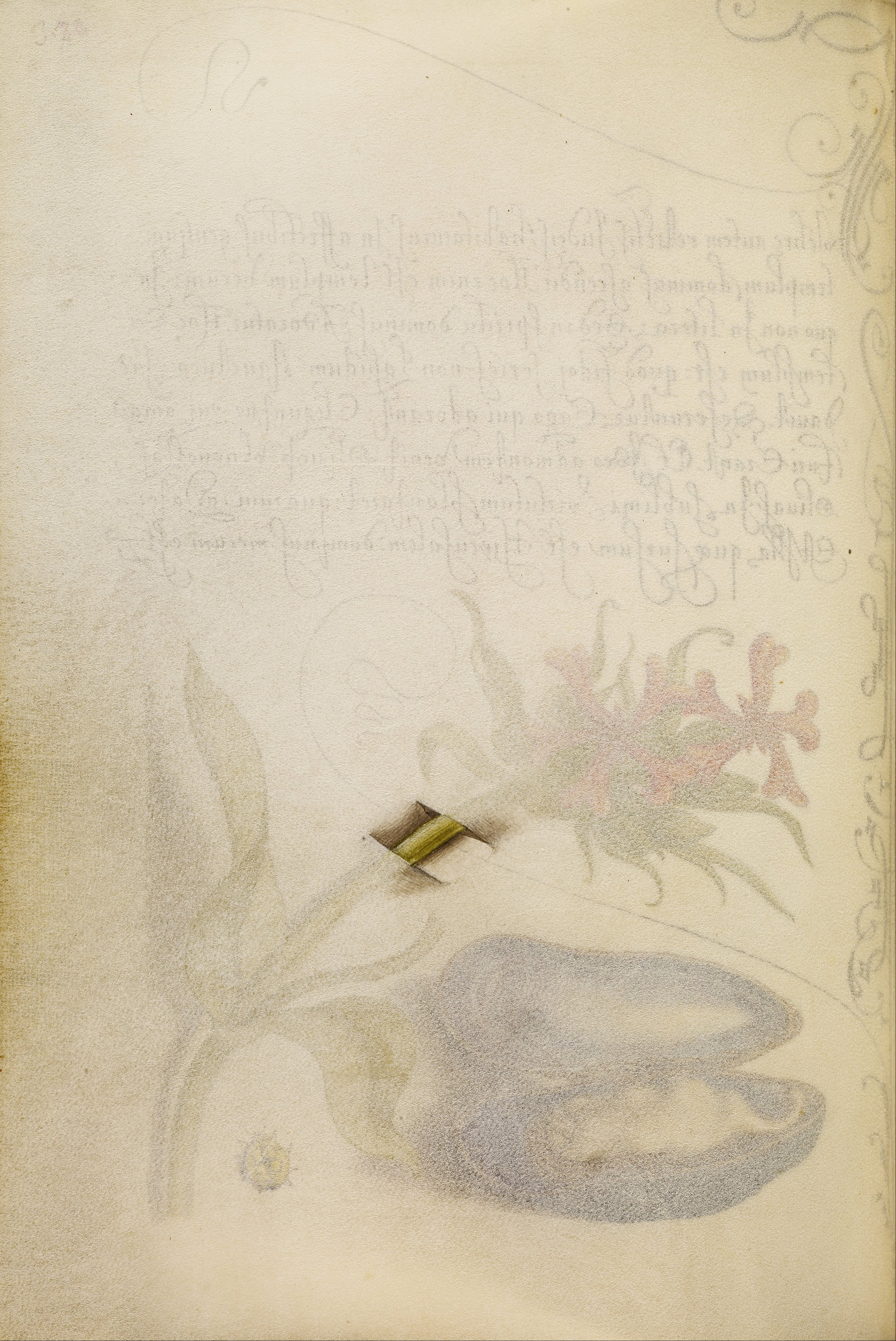
Trompe-l'Oeil stem of a Maltese Cross (1561) by Joris Hoefnagel

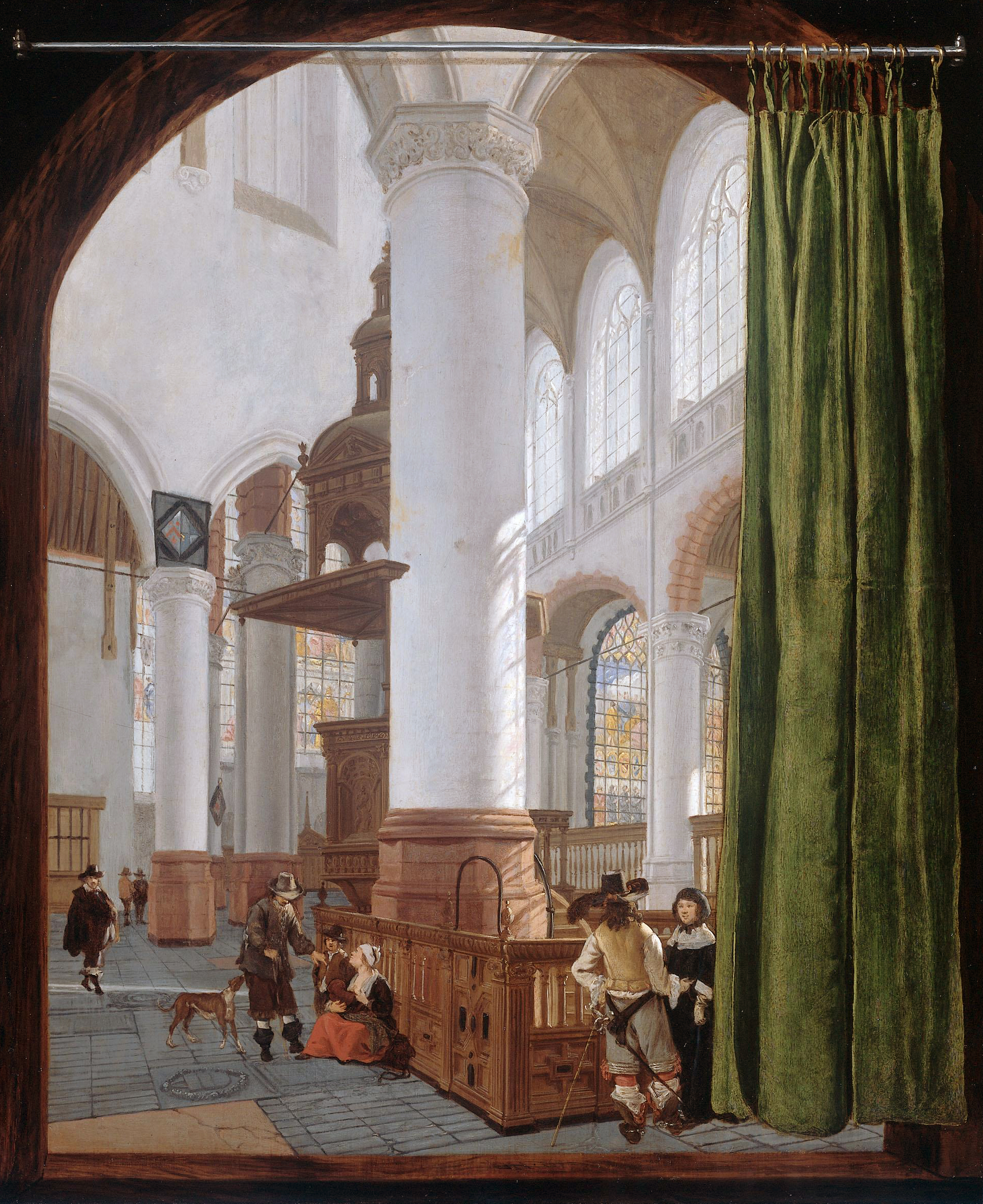
Church interior by Gerard Houckgeest (c. 1654)

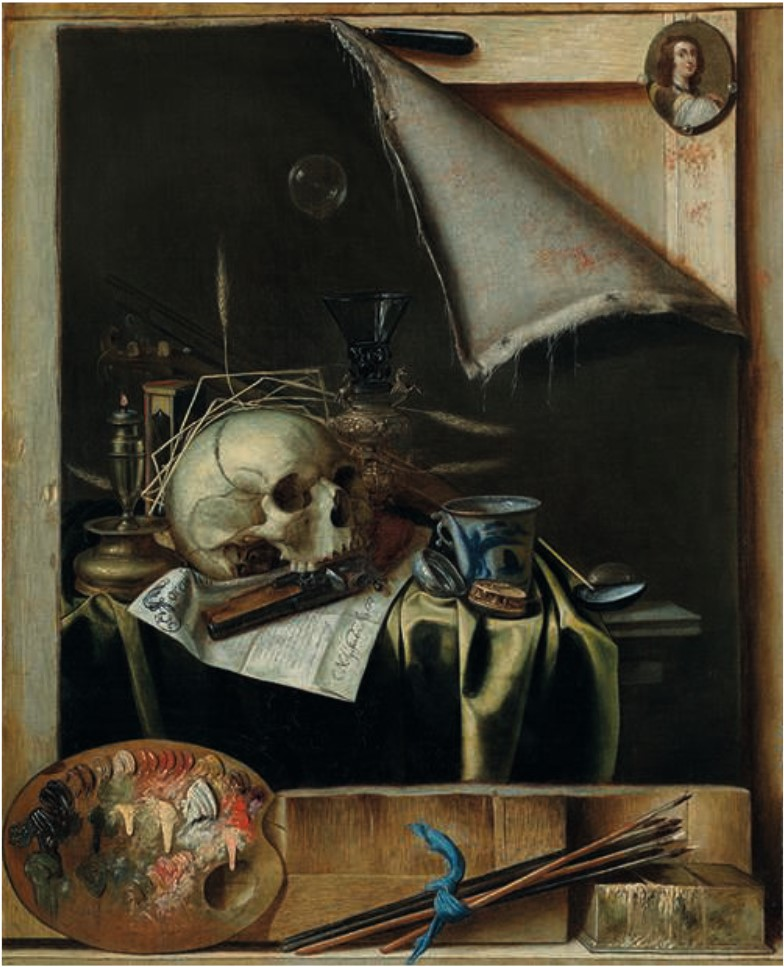
Trompe l'oeil Studio Wall with Vanitas Still Life, Cornelis Norbertus Gijsbrechts, 1664

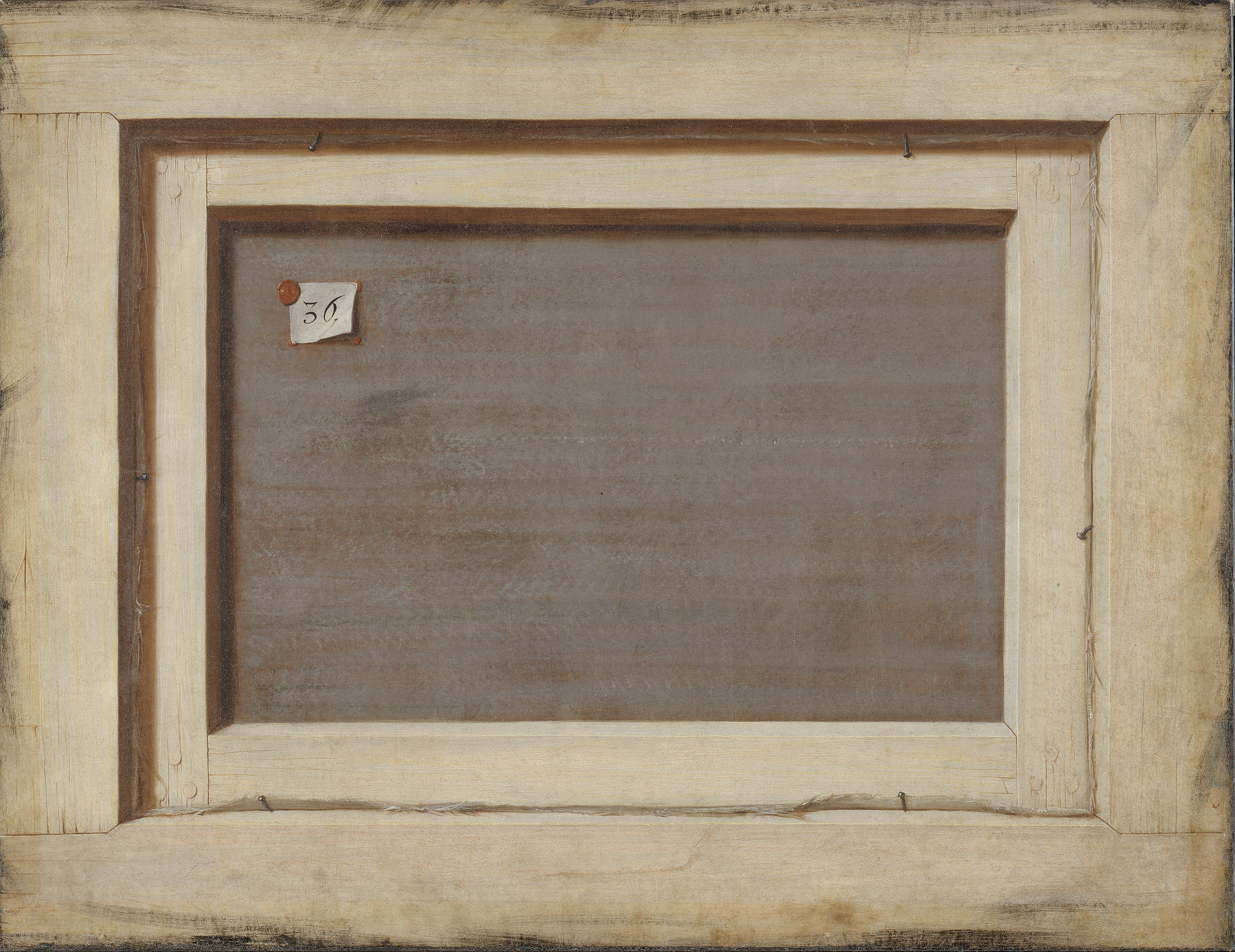
The reverse of a framed painting by Cornelis Norbertus Gijsbrechts, 1670

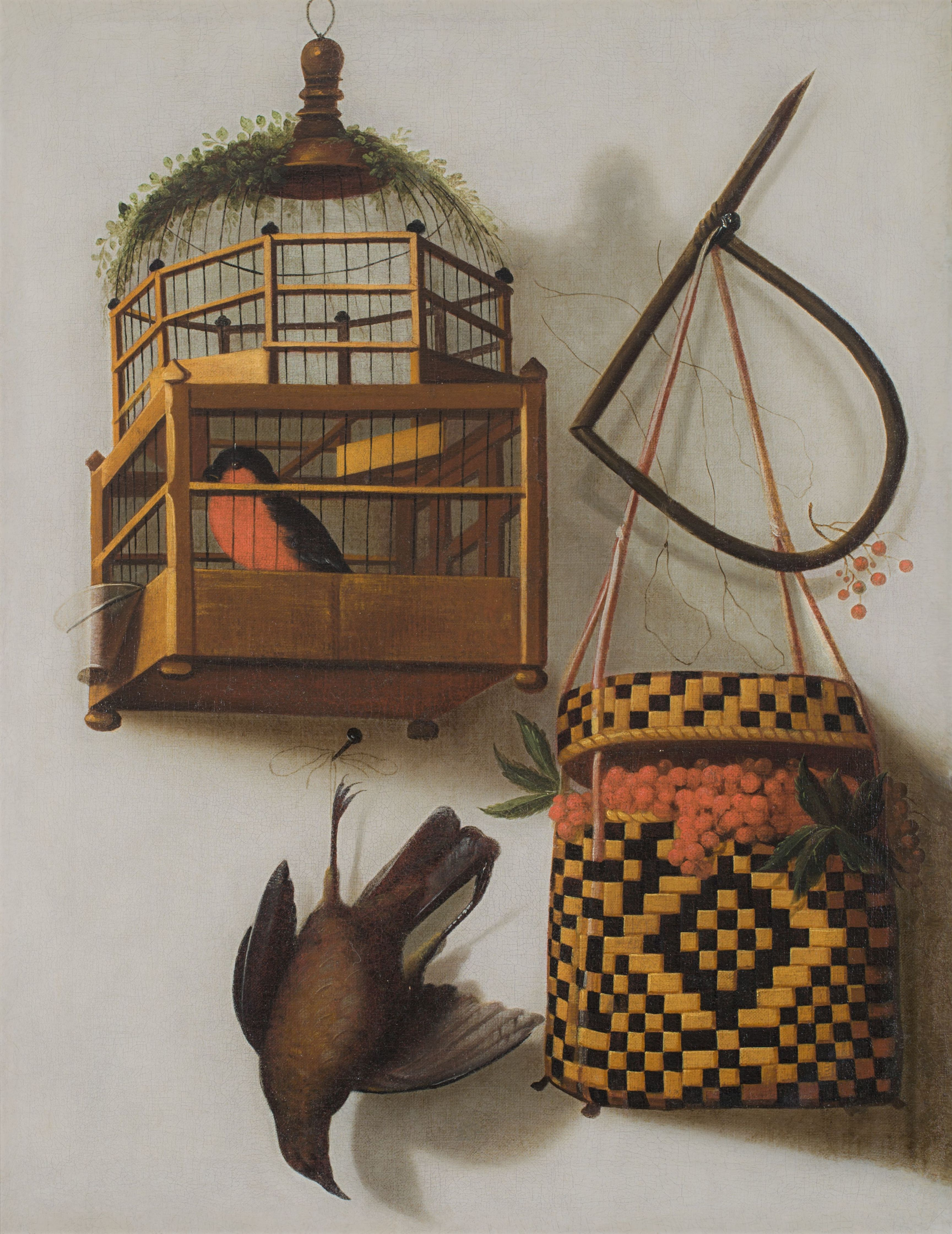
Trompe l'oeil with a bird cage, Cornelis Biltius, 1680s

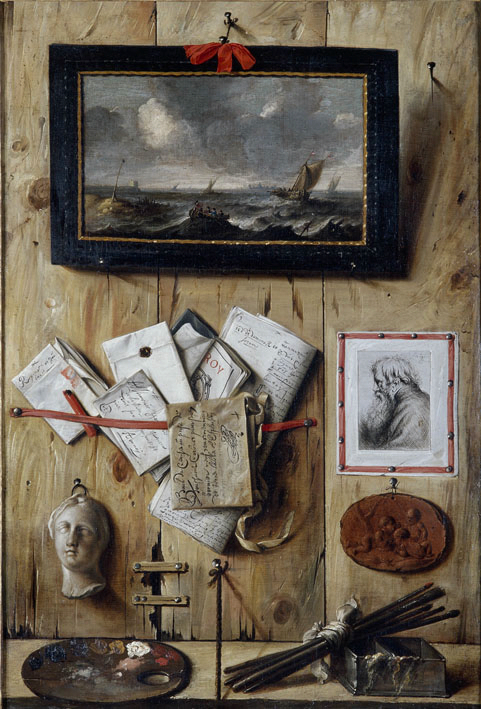
Trompe-l'oeil, Jean-François de Le Motte, 1680–1700

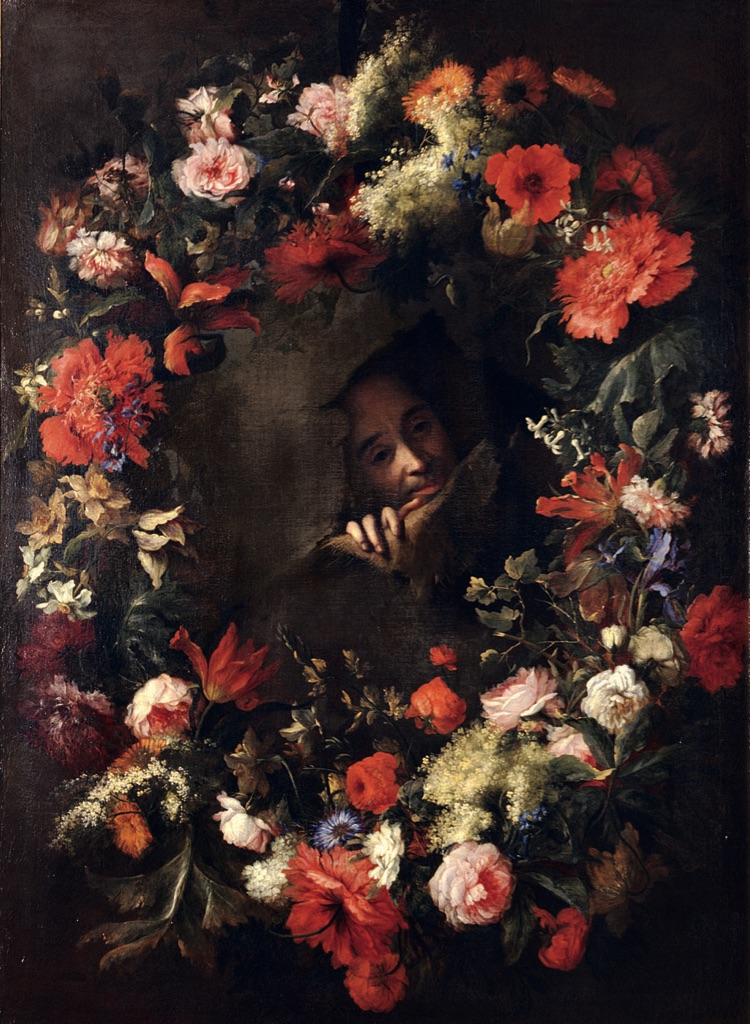
Portrait of François Rivière by Nicola van Houbraken, c. 1700

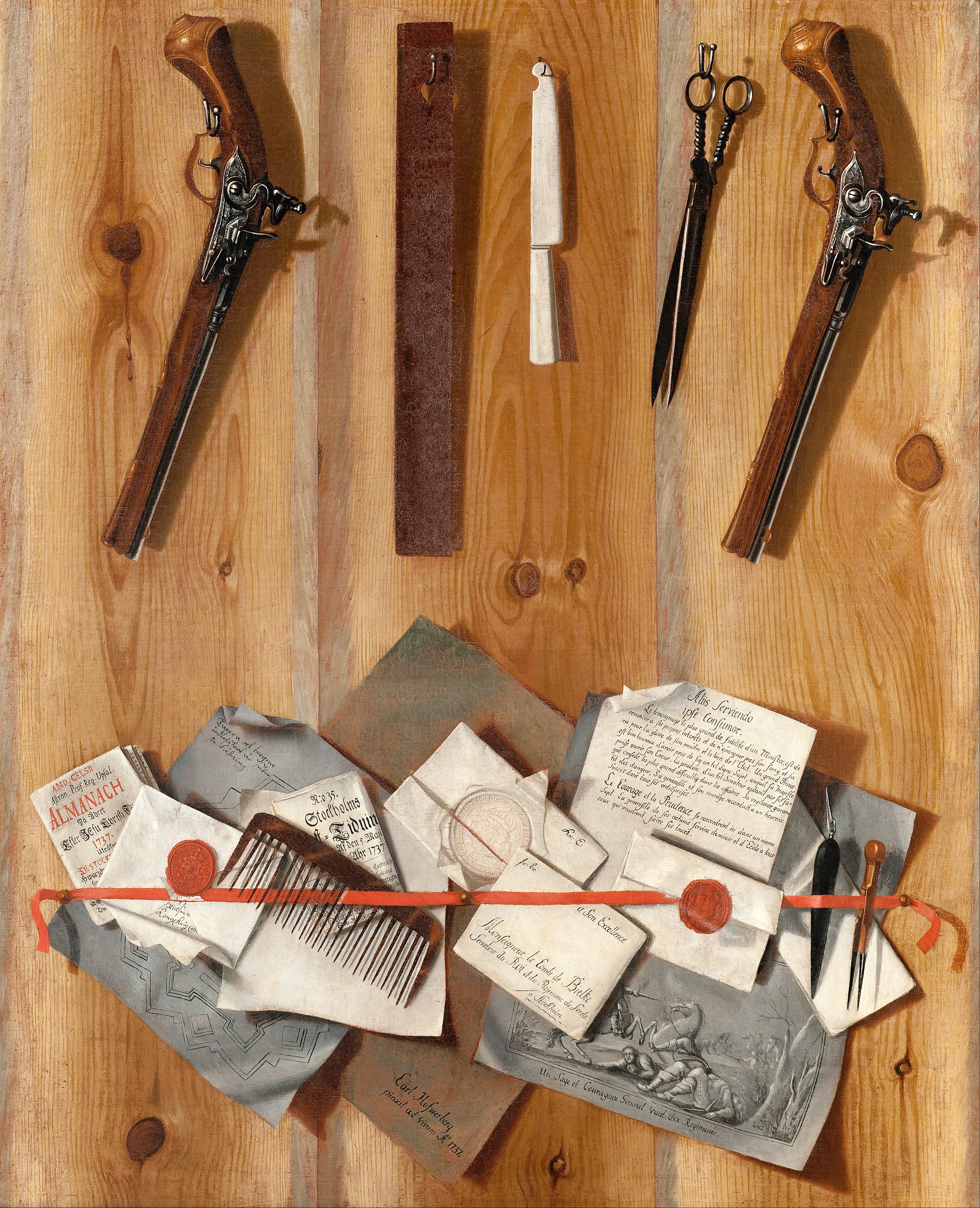
Trompe l´oeil, 1737 by Carl Hofverberg

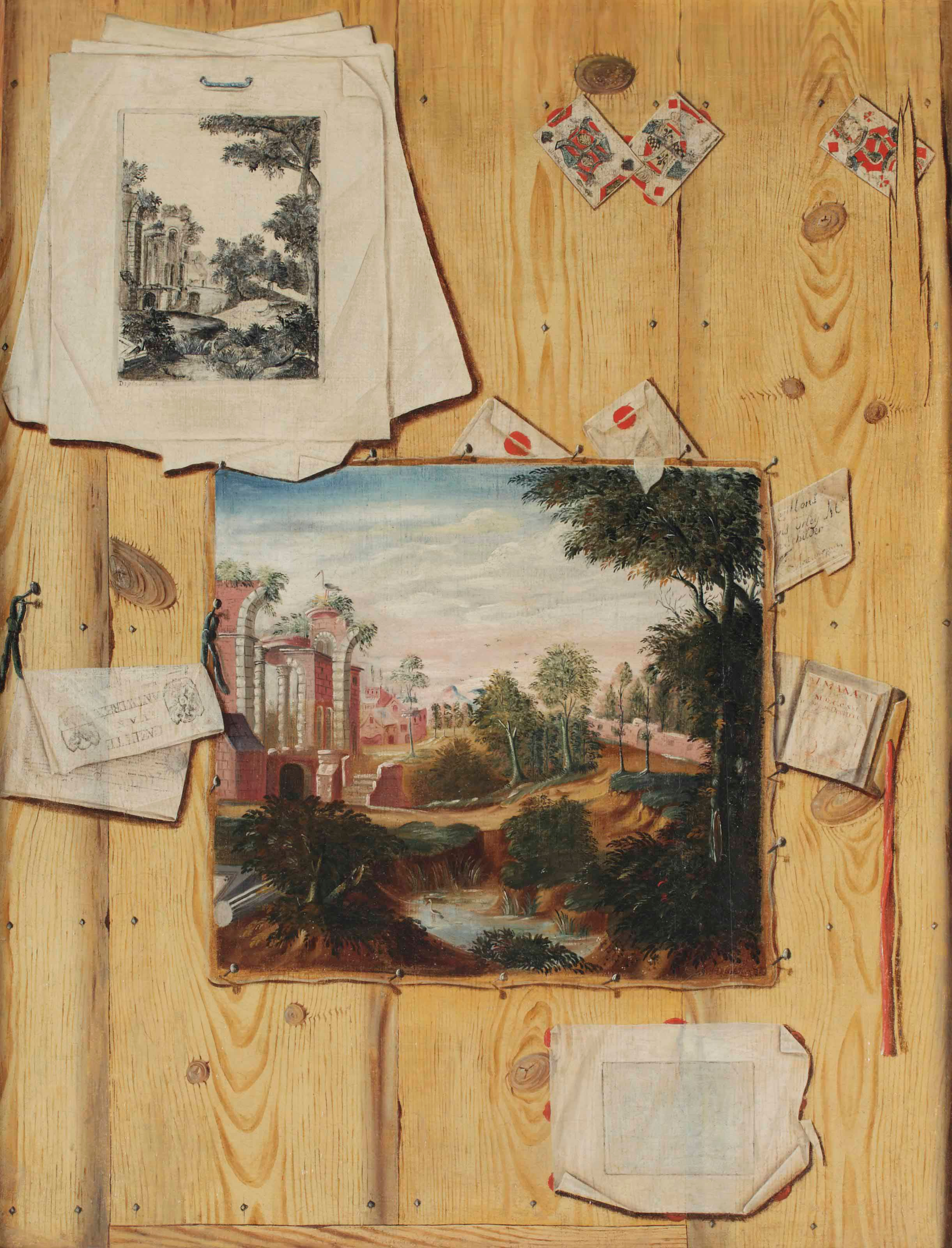
A 'trompe l'oeil' of a wooden panelling with a painted canvas of a landscape 'capriccio', a pile of prints with a repetition of the painted subject, an almanach, sealed letters and playing cards, Jacobus Plasschaert, 1650s

Printed Pages. Trompe l'œil by Nicolaas de Wit, 1740

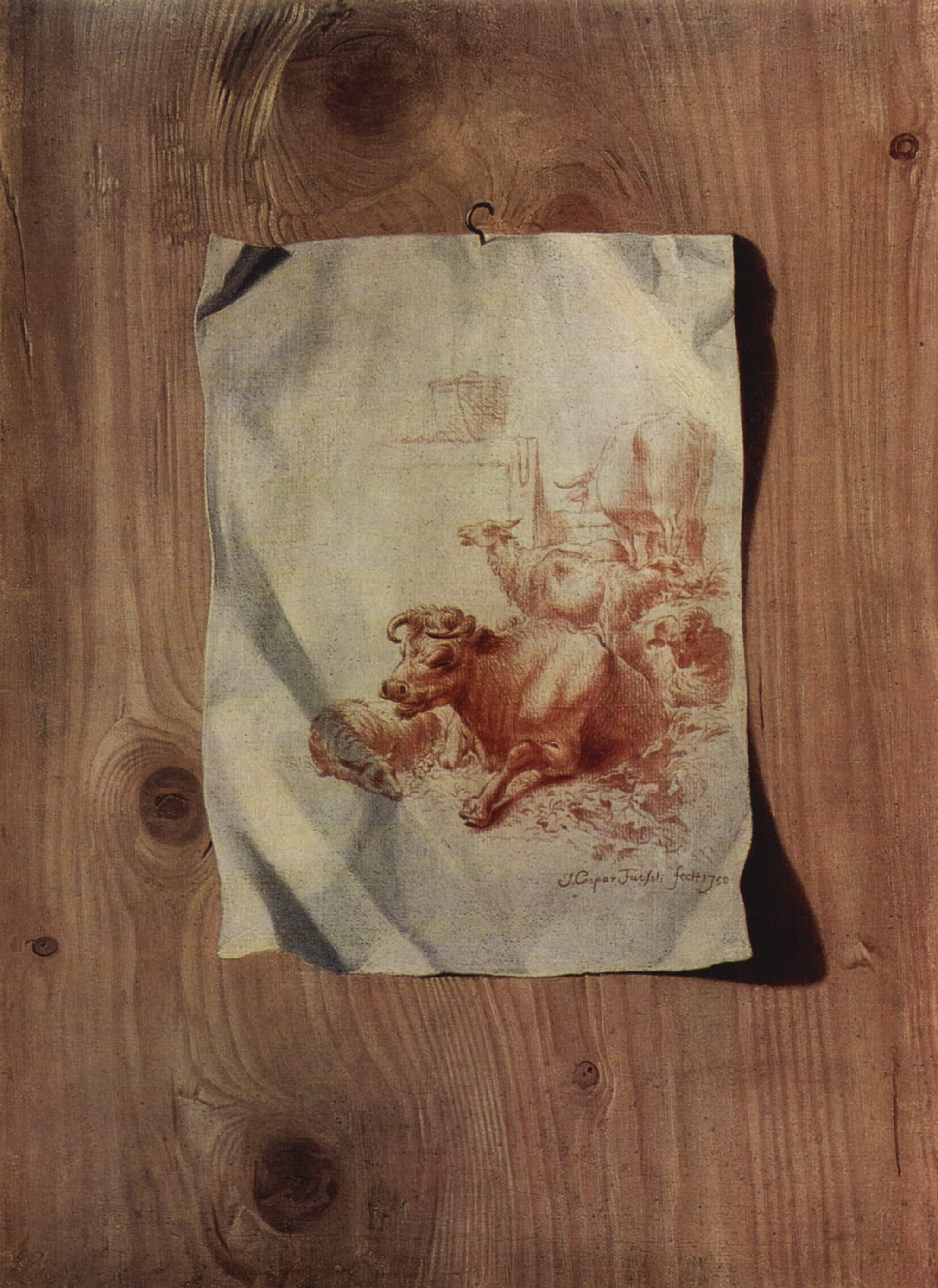
Trompe l'œil by Henry Fuseli, 1750

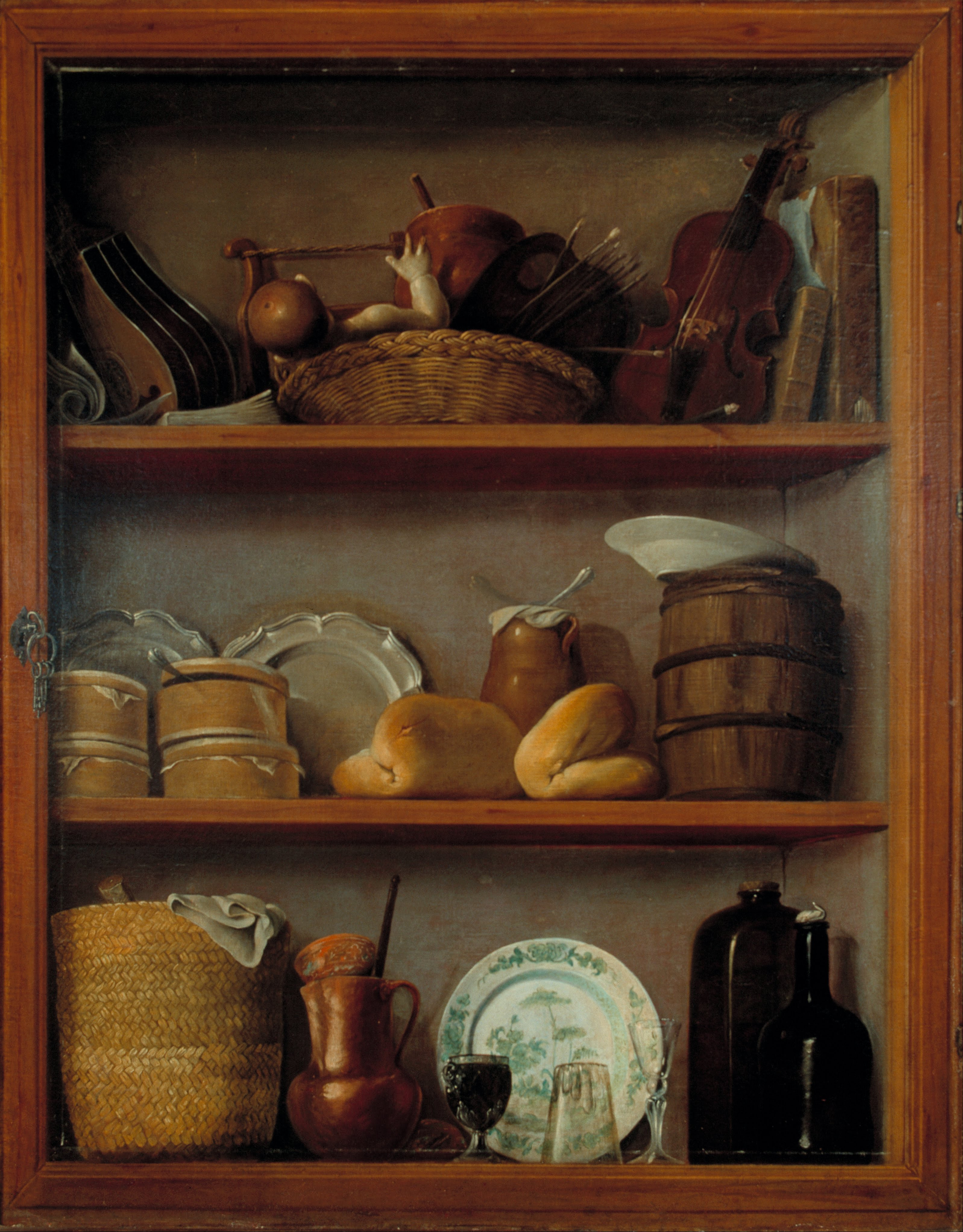
Antonio Pérez de Aguilar, Cupboard, c. 1769, National Gallery of Art

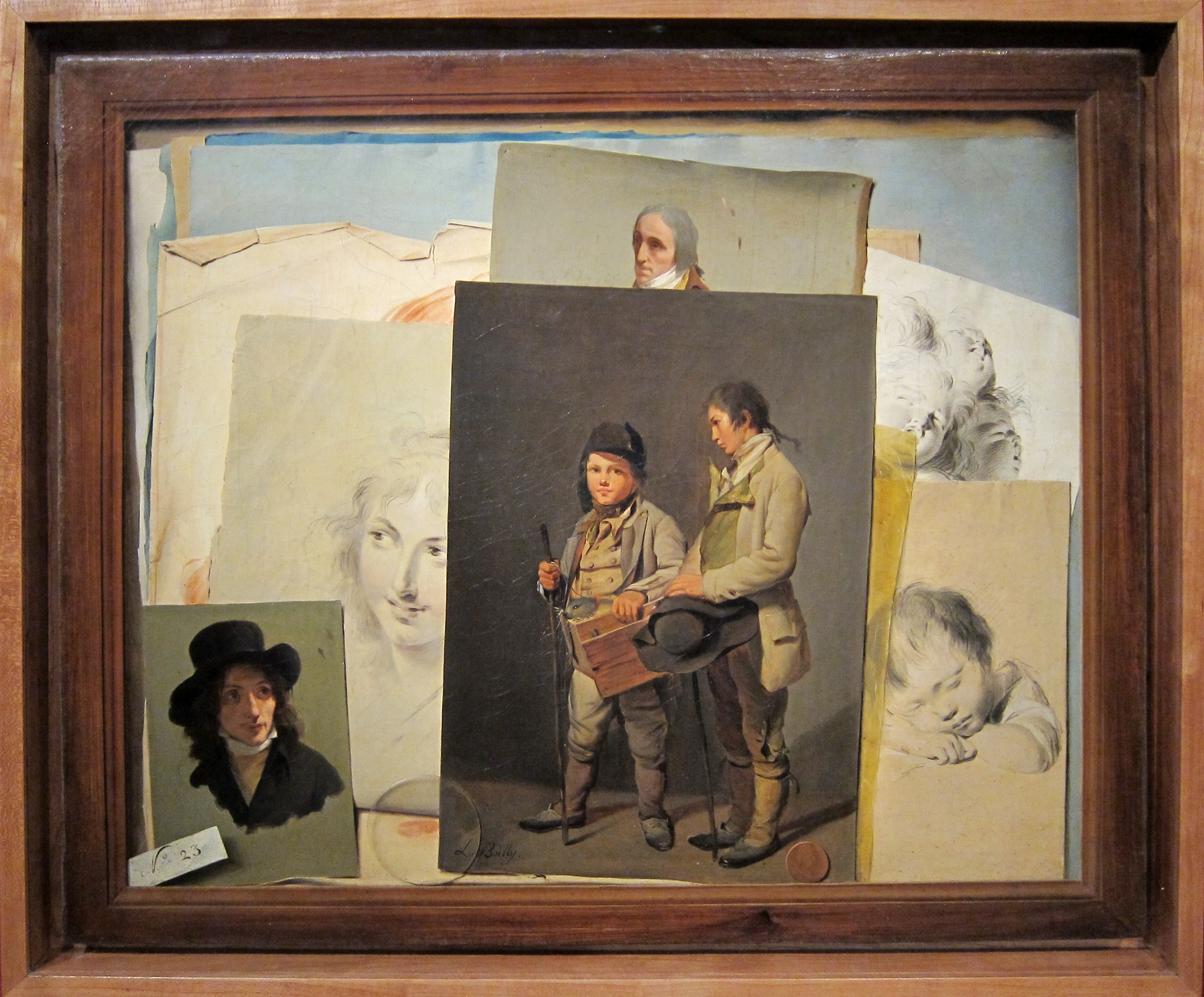
Trompe l'œil dit aux dessins et aux savoyards by Louis-Léopold Boilly, c. 1804–1807

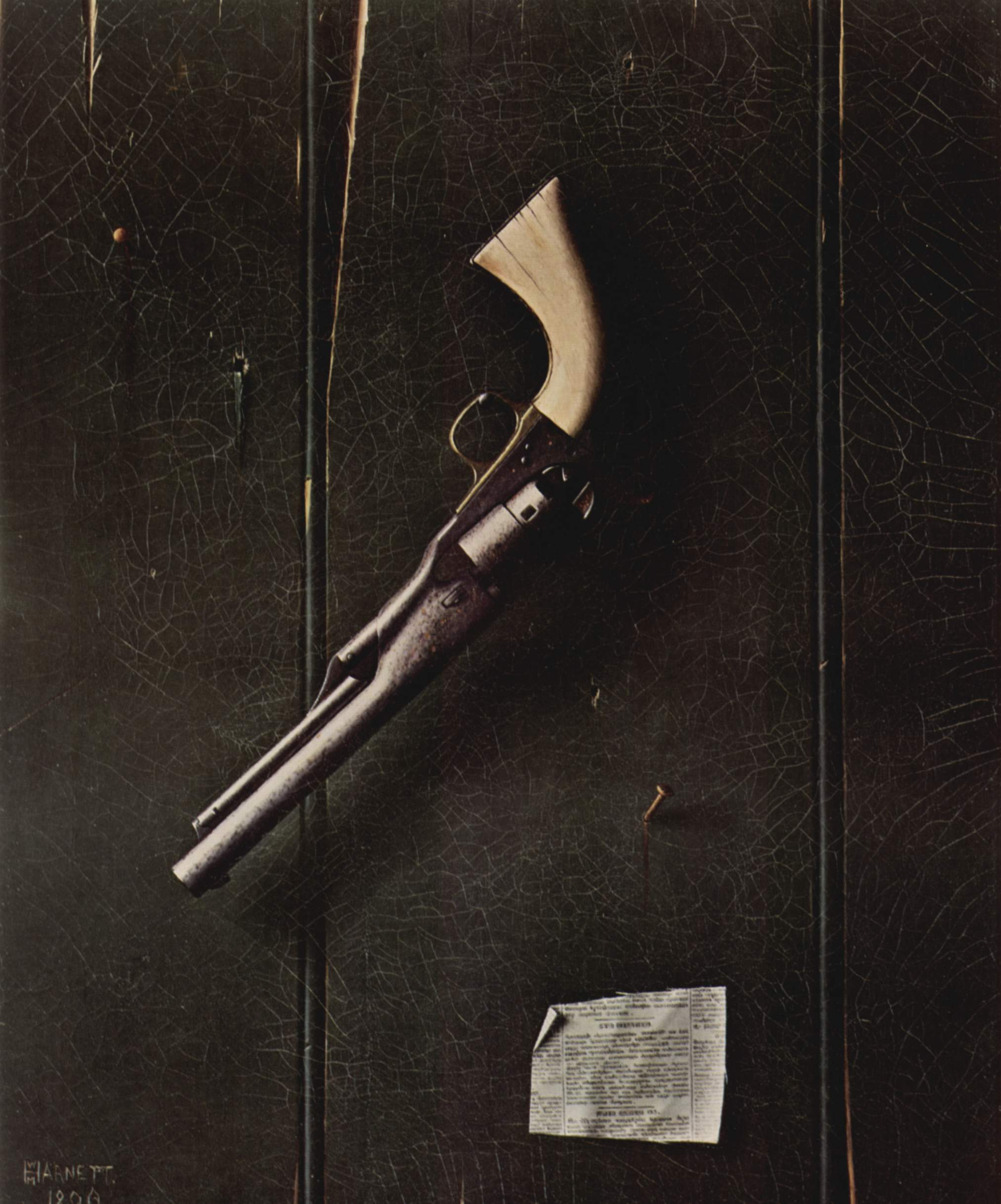
The Faithful Colt, 1890 by William Michael Harnett

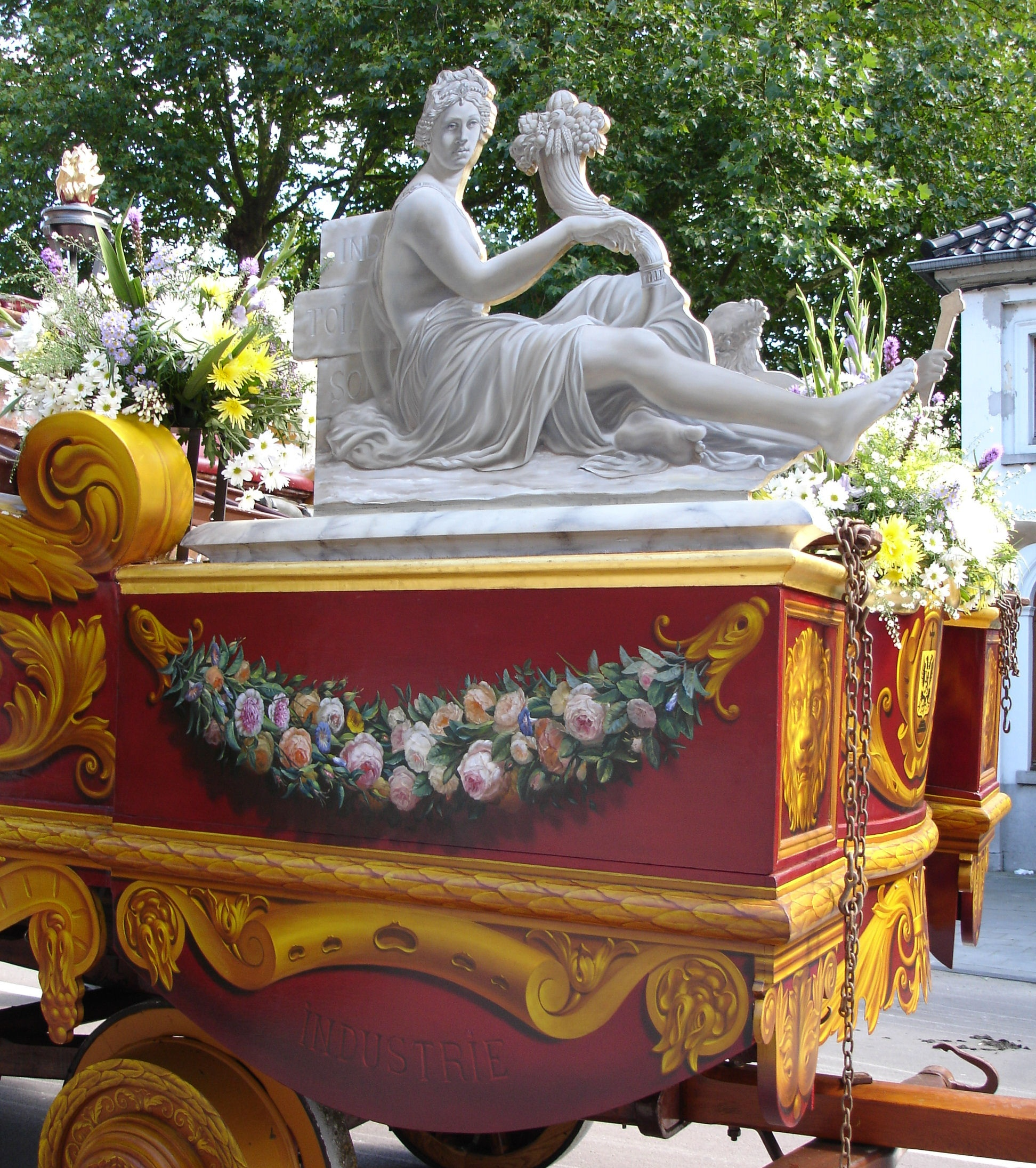
Char de la Ville (photographed 2006)—the "sculpture" is a flat cutout

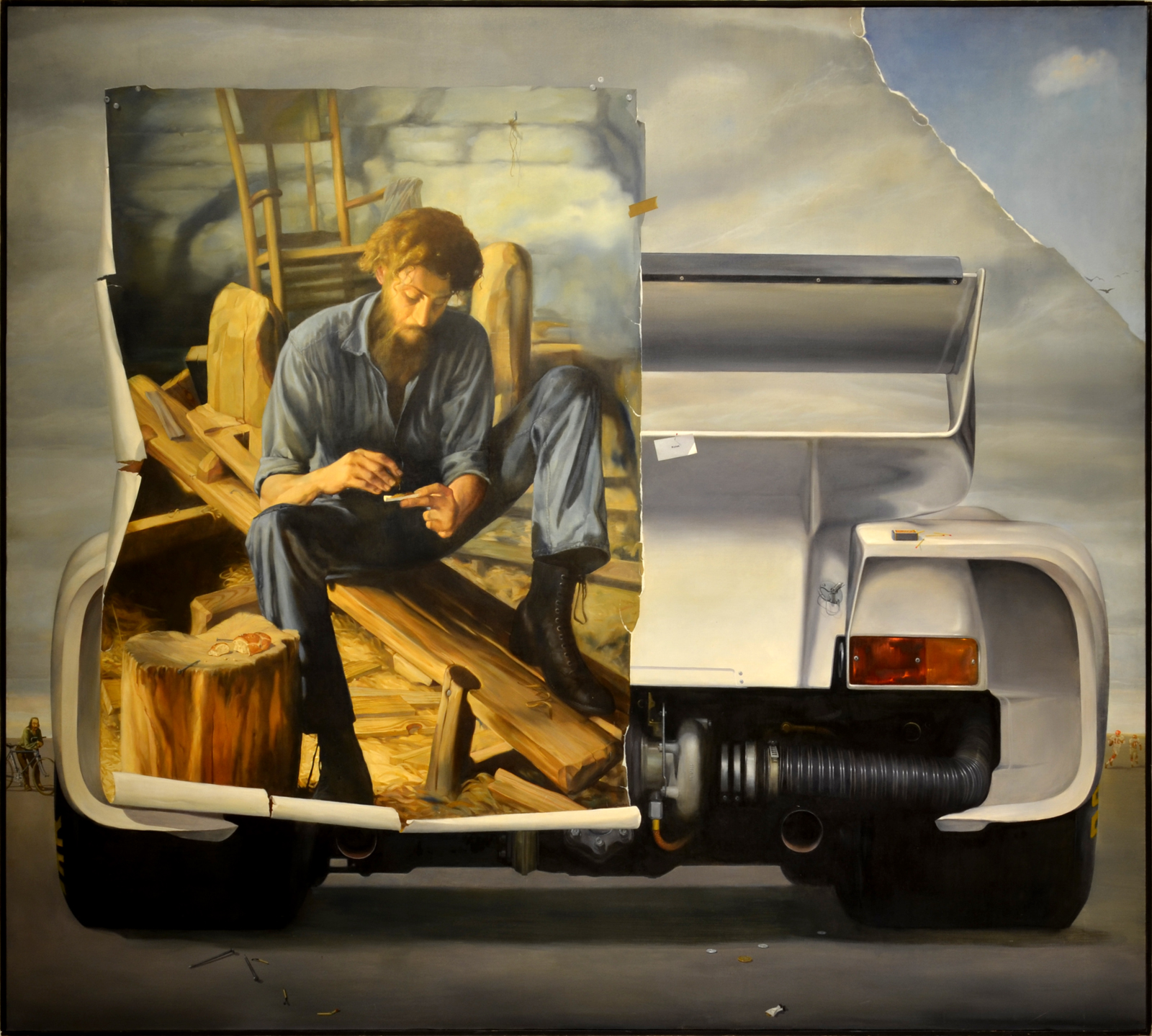
Theodor Pištěk, Josef N., (1978), Art Library Project

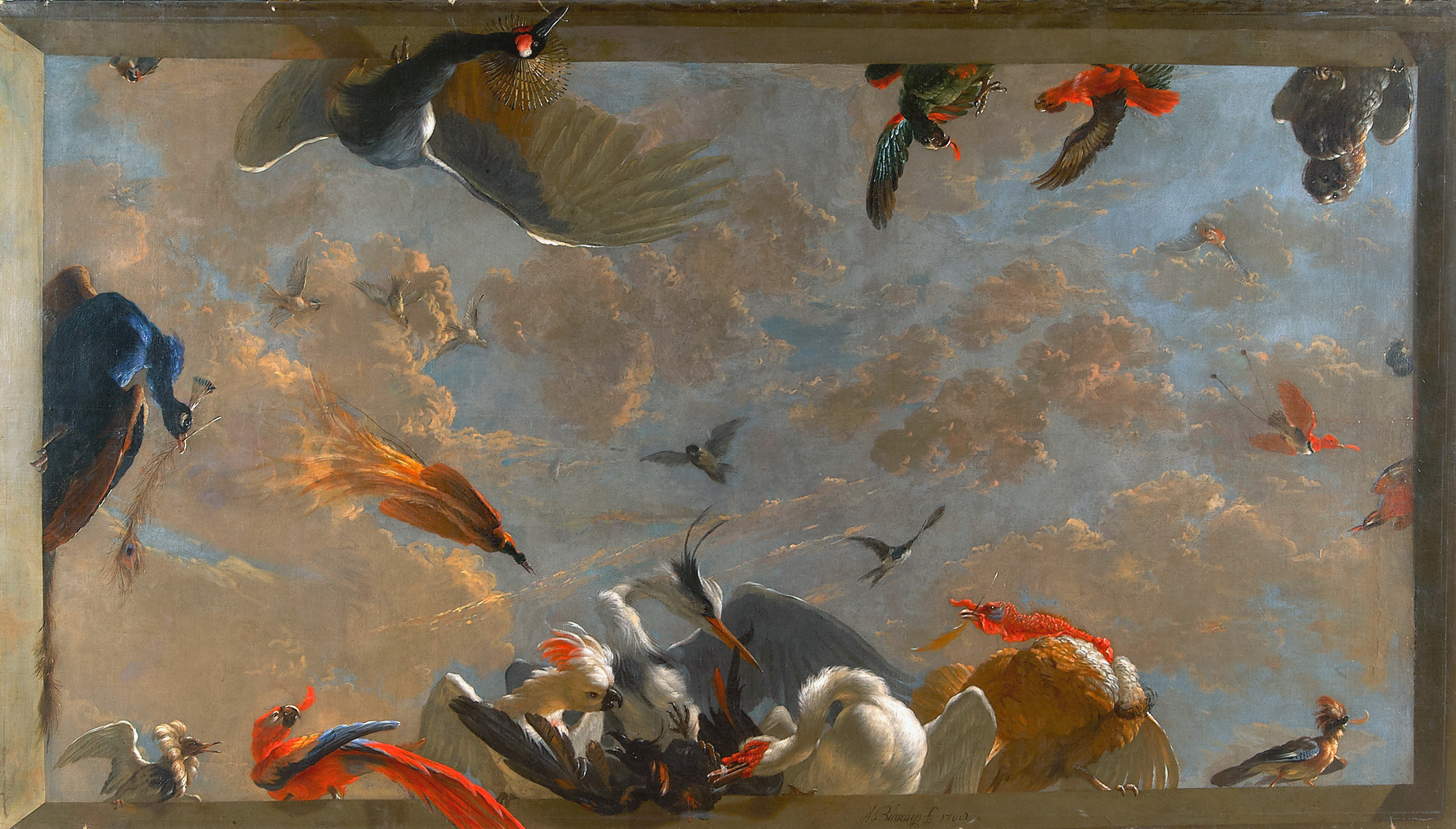
Ceiling piece with birds by Abraham Busschop, 1708

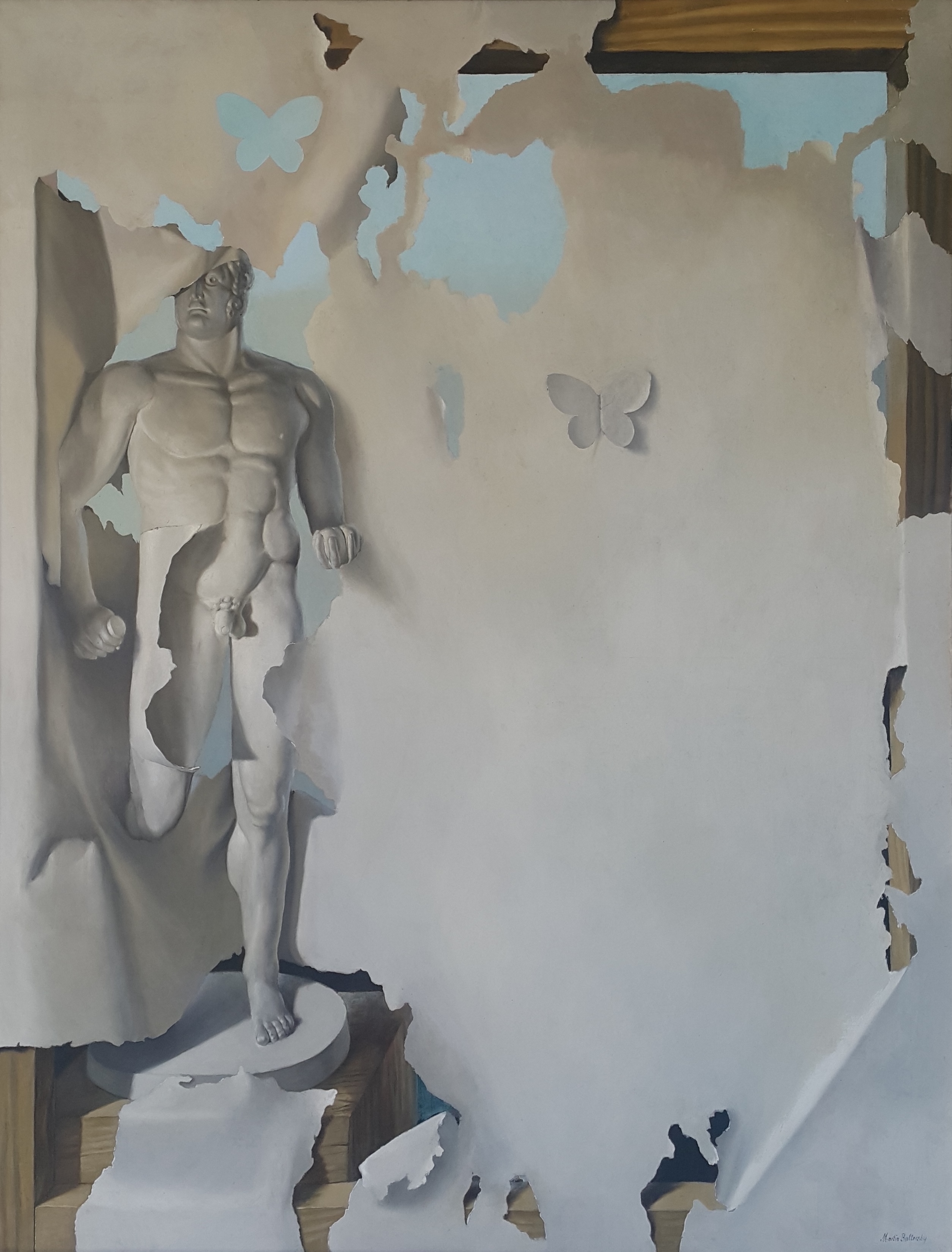
Martin Battersby, Hercules, oil on canvas, 1975

== Murals ==
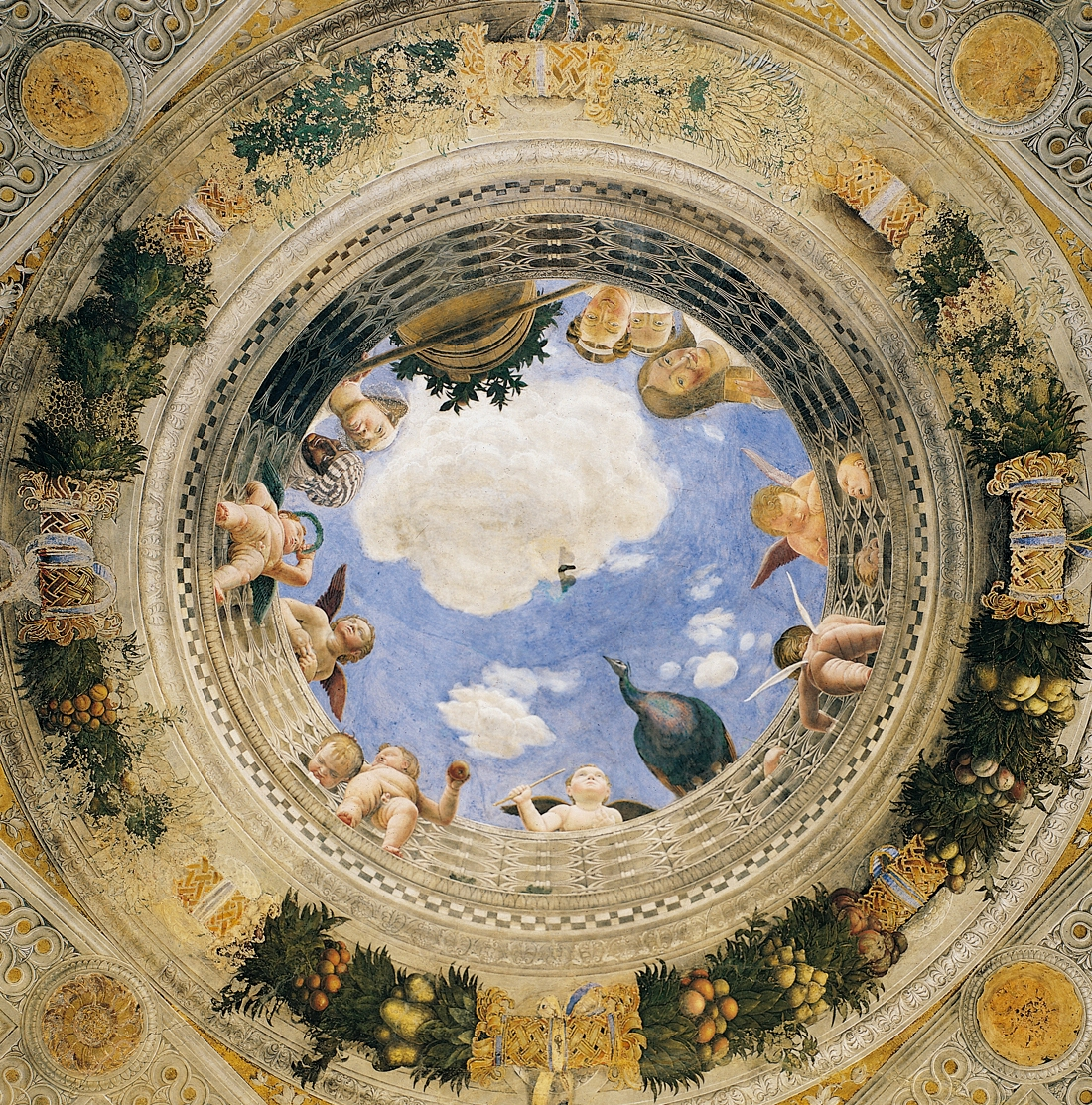
Oculus on the ceiling of the Spouses Chamber, castle of San Giorgio in Mantua, Italy, by Andrea Mantegna

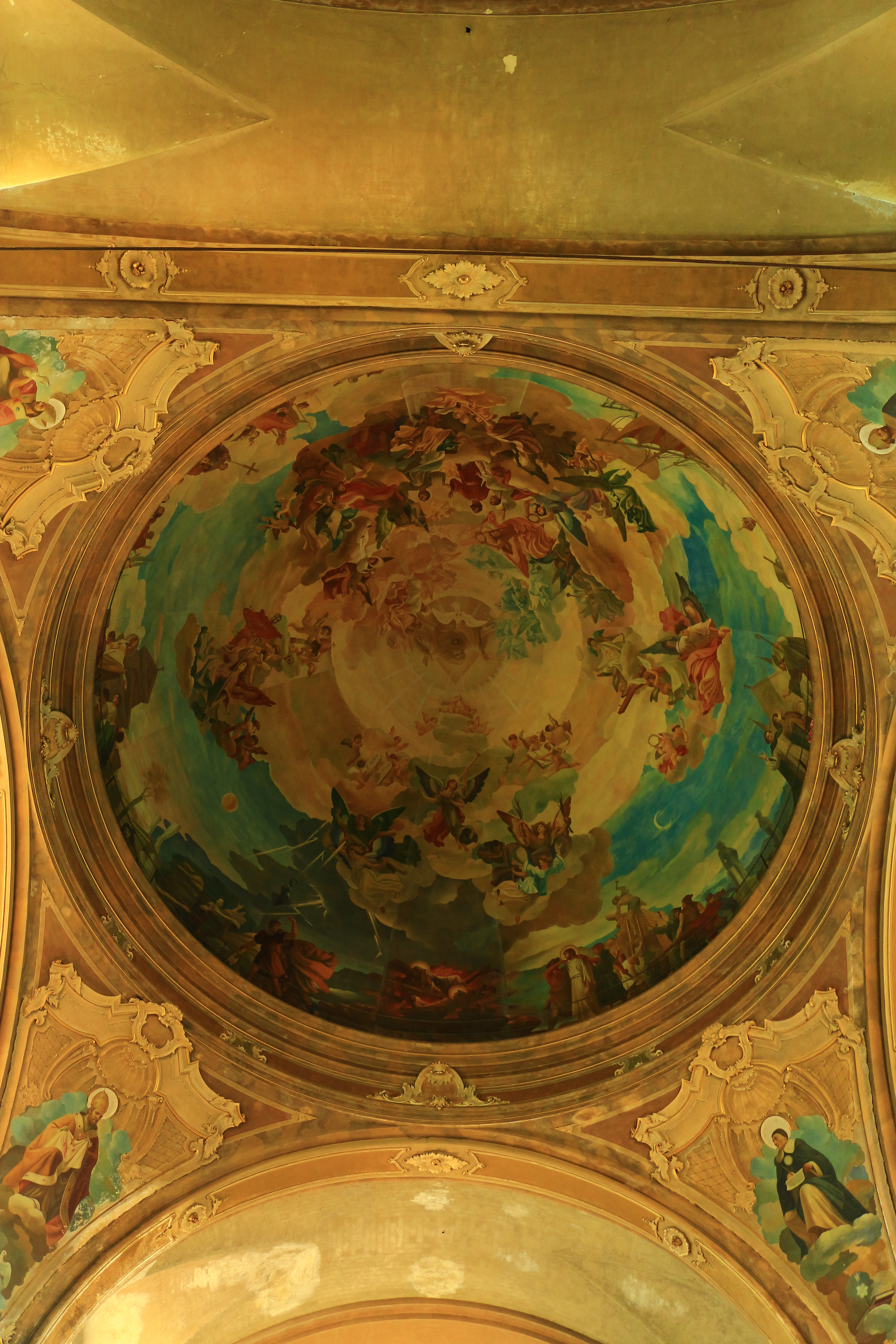
Trompe-l'œil cupola in the church of Brivio, Italy

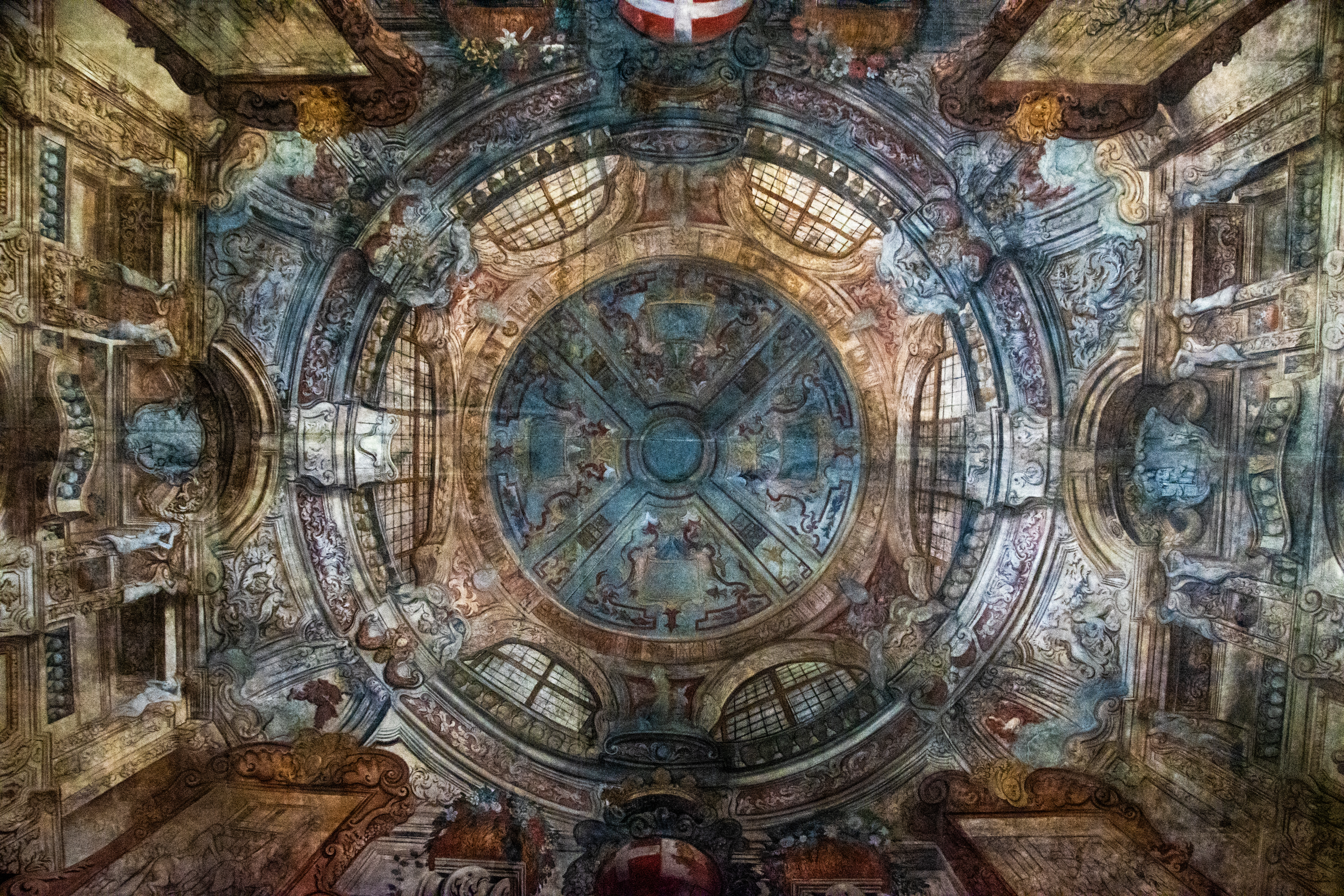
Trompe-l'œil fresco on the ceiling of the Grandmaster's Palace, Valletta, Malta, by Nicolau Nasoni

Trompe-l'œil fresco mimicking gilded stucco on the ceiling of Salle du Sacre, Palace of Versailles, France

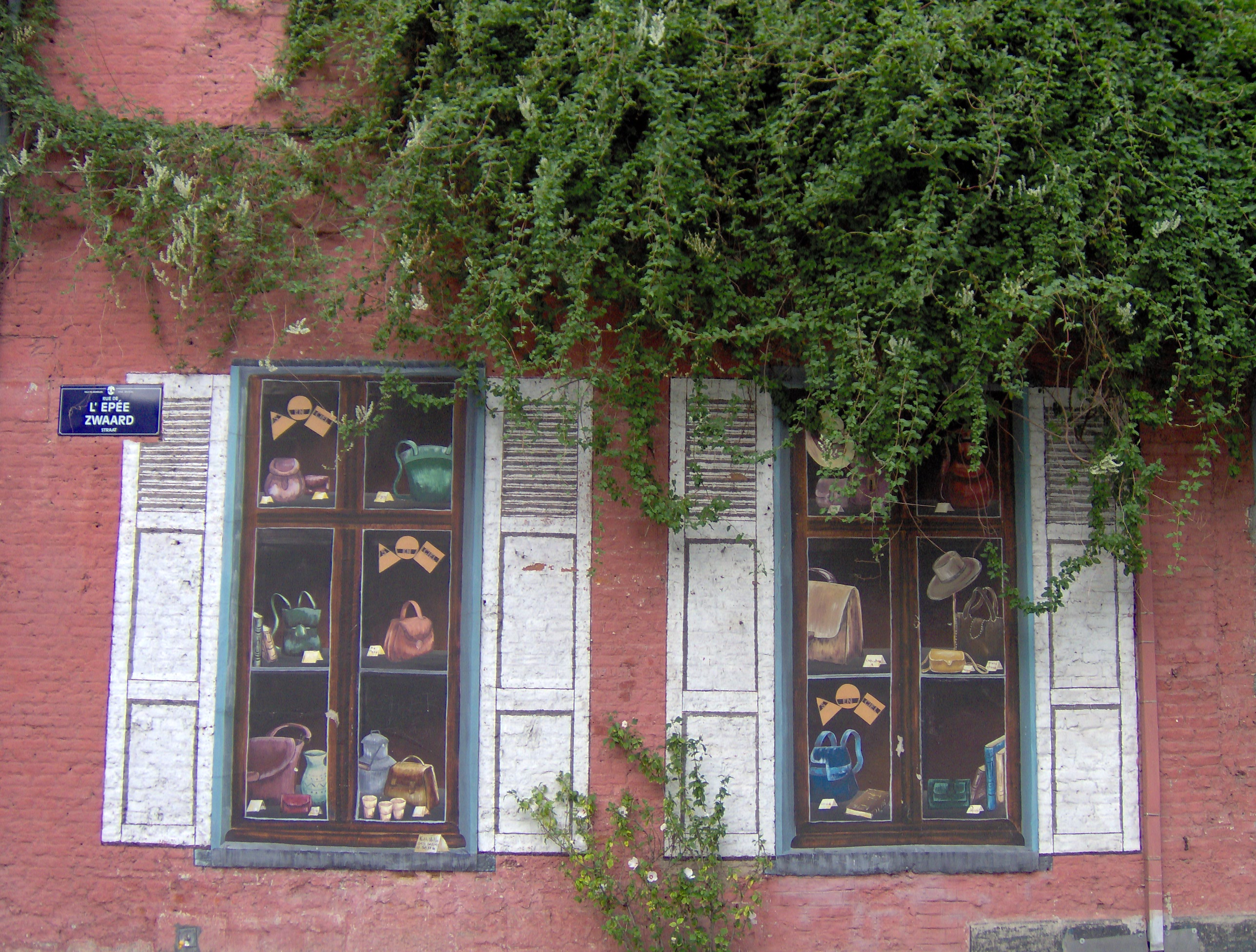
Painted windows, Rue de l'Épée/Zwaardstraat, Brussels

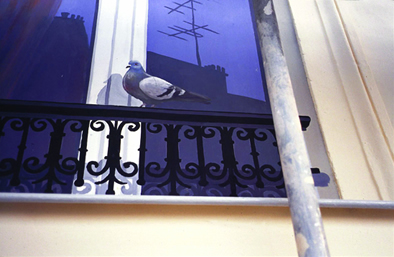
A trompe-l'œil of a pigeon on a window sill, façade mural, rue Emile Lepeu in the 11th arrondissement of Paris, France

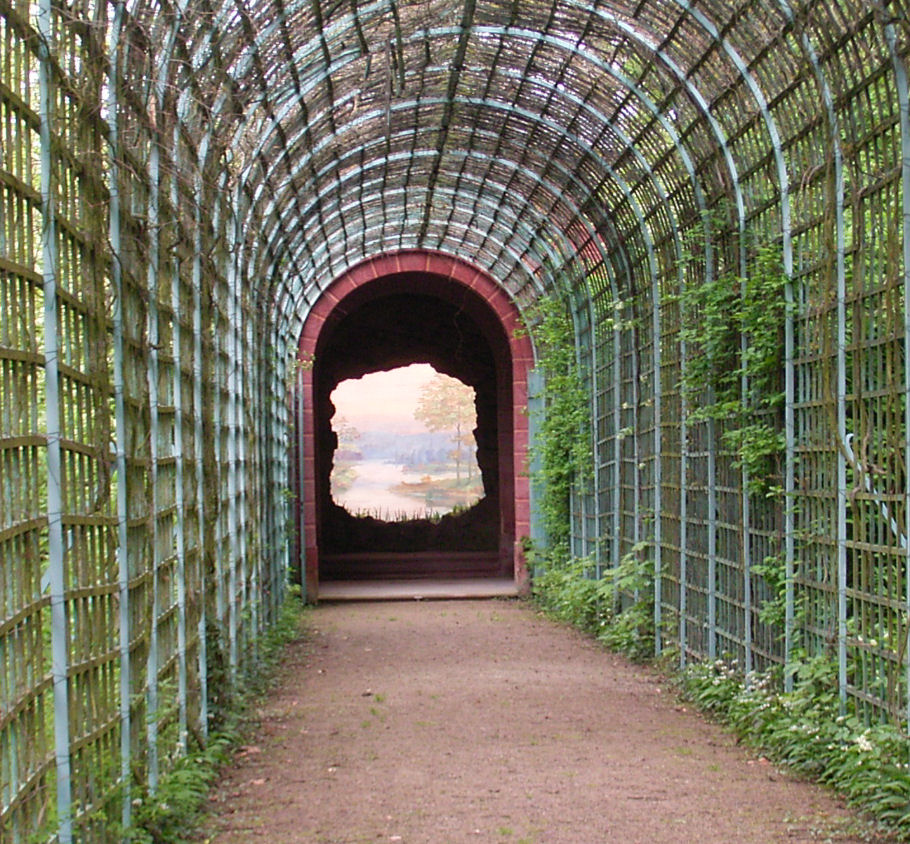
Mural in Schwetzingen, Germany (the view "through" the wall at the end)

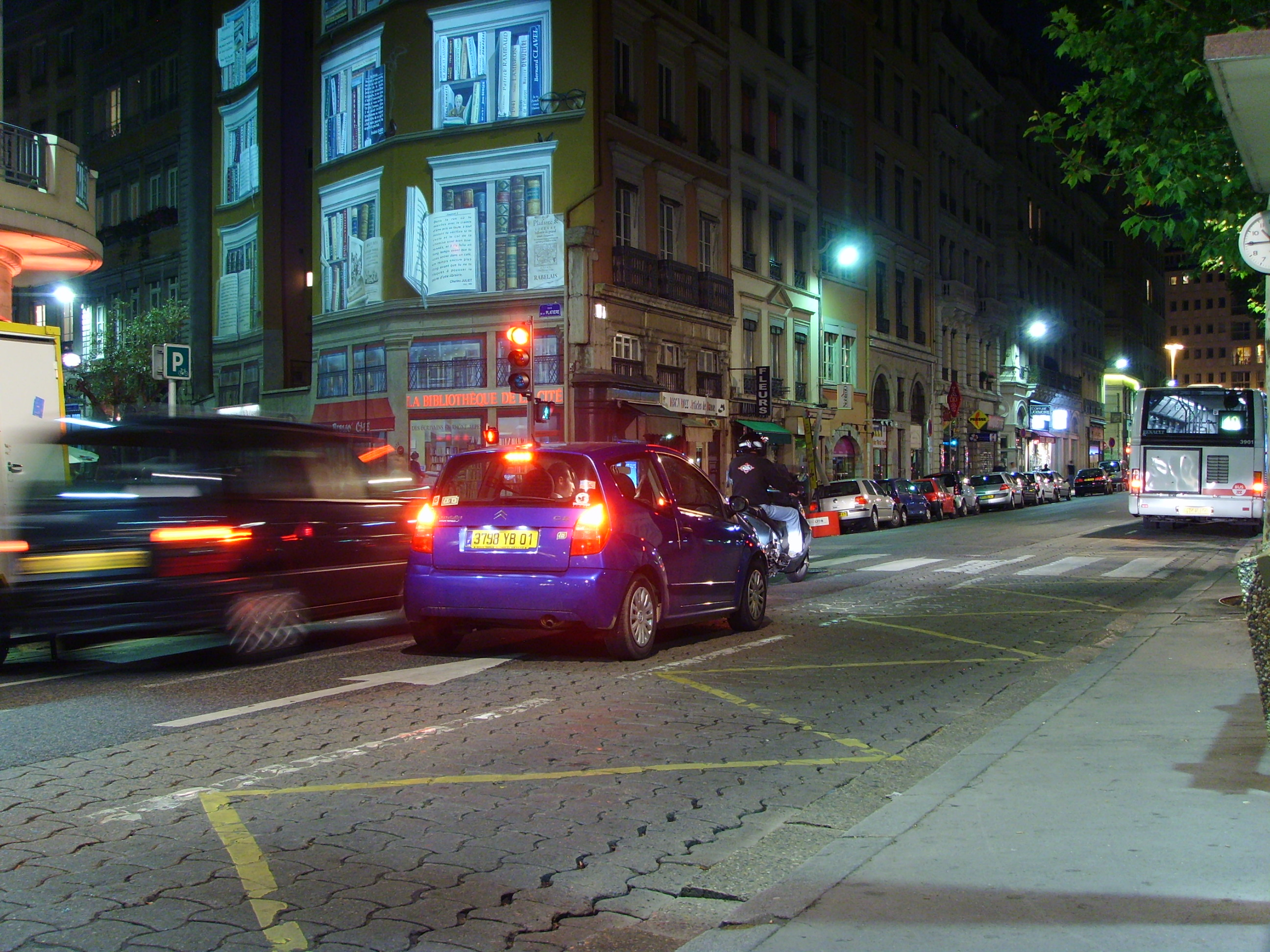
A trompe-l'œil in Lyon, France

Bronze Statues trompe-l'œil in Mt. Pleasant, Utah

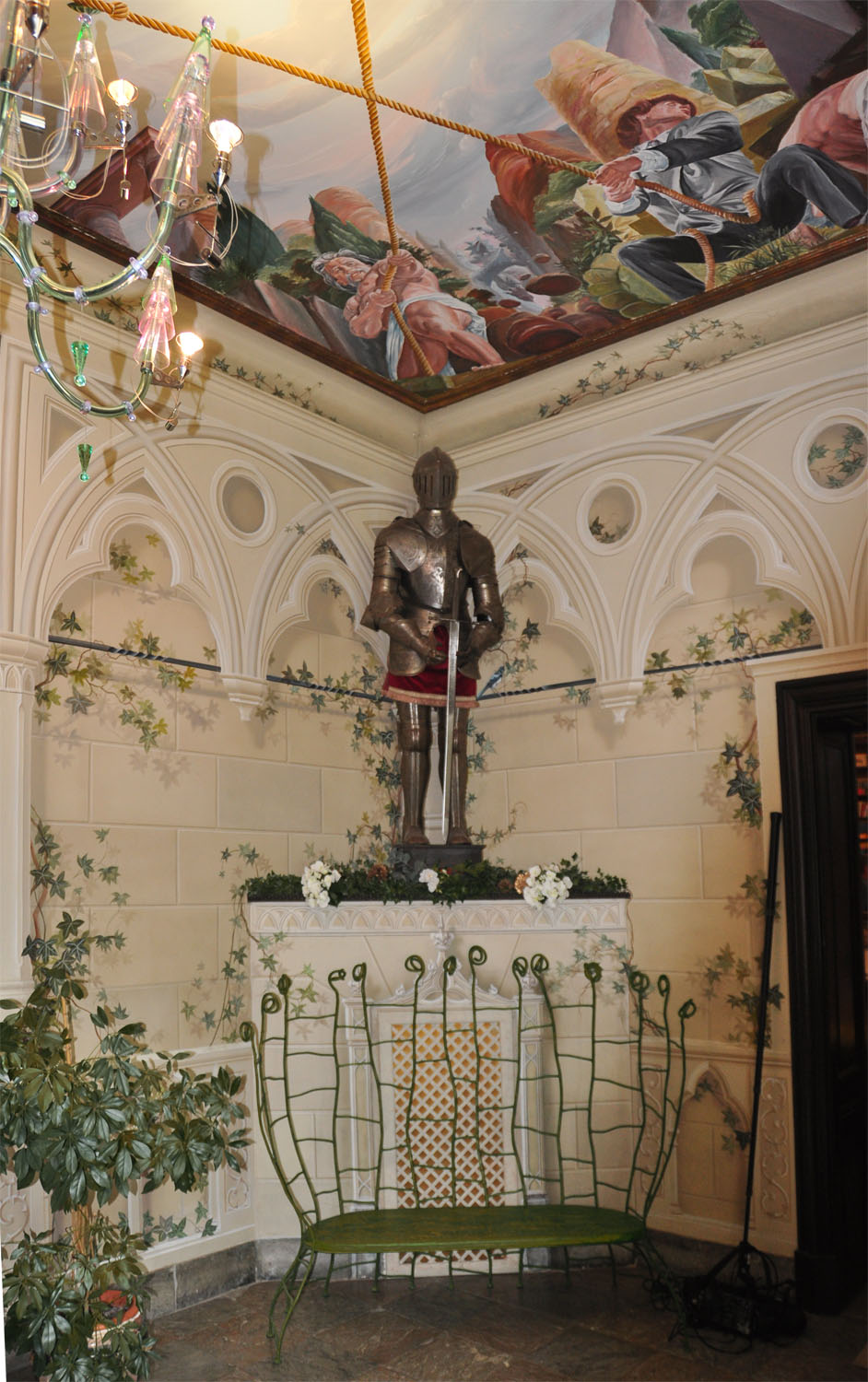
Architectural wall and ceiling trompe-l'œil, Entrance to the library of Chateau Thal, by Rainer Maria Latzke

Painted trompe-l'œil mosaic, floor in the Villa Paradou in Nice, France, by Rainer Maria Latzke

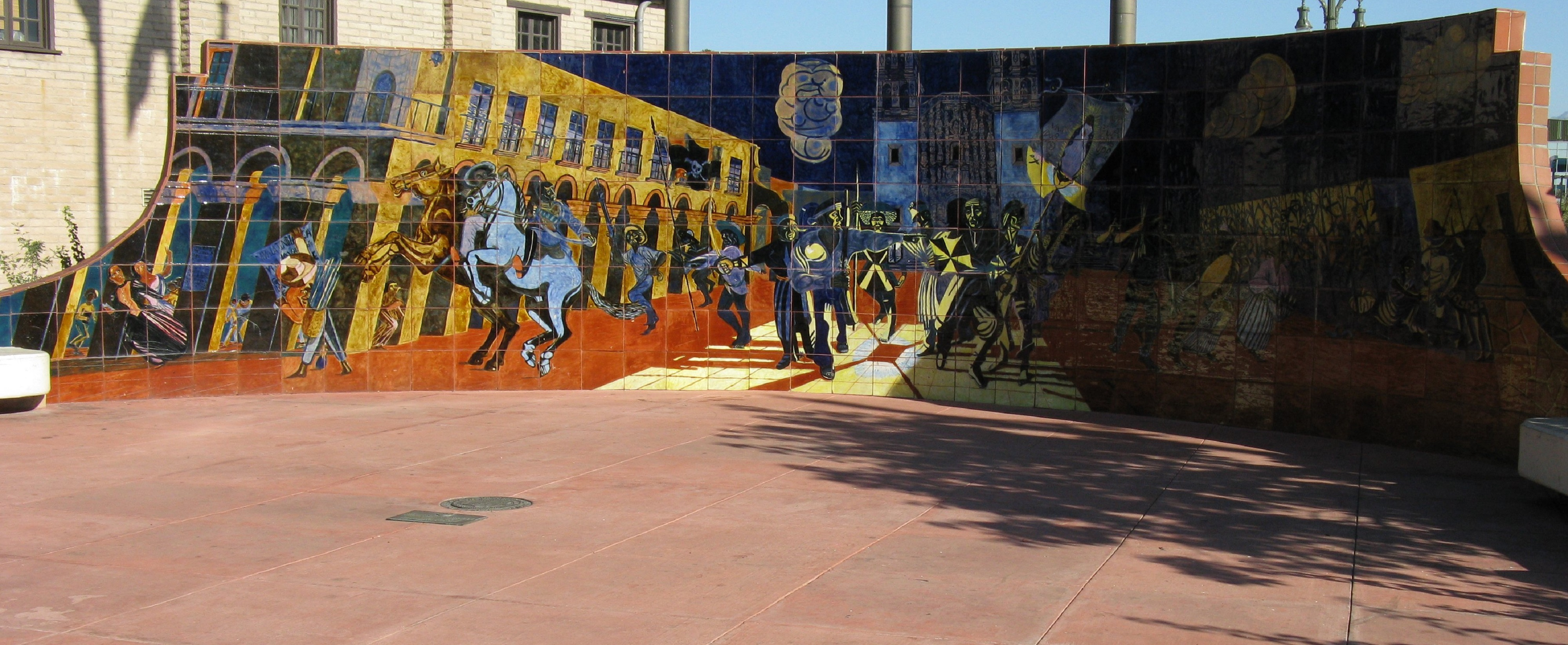
Los Angeles Plaza Historic District: mural off Alameda Street

Conceptual trompe-l'œil mural at California State University, Chico titled "Academe", featuring Doric columns and crumbling walls, by John Pugh

== Sculptures ==
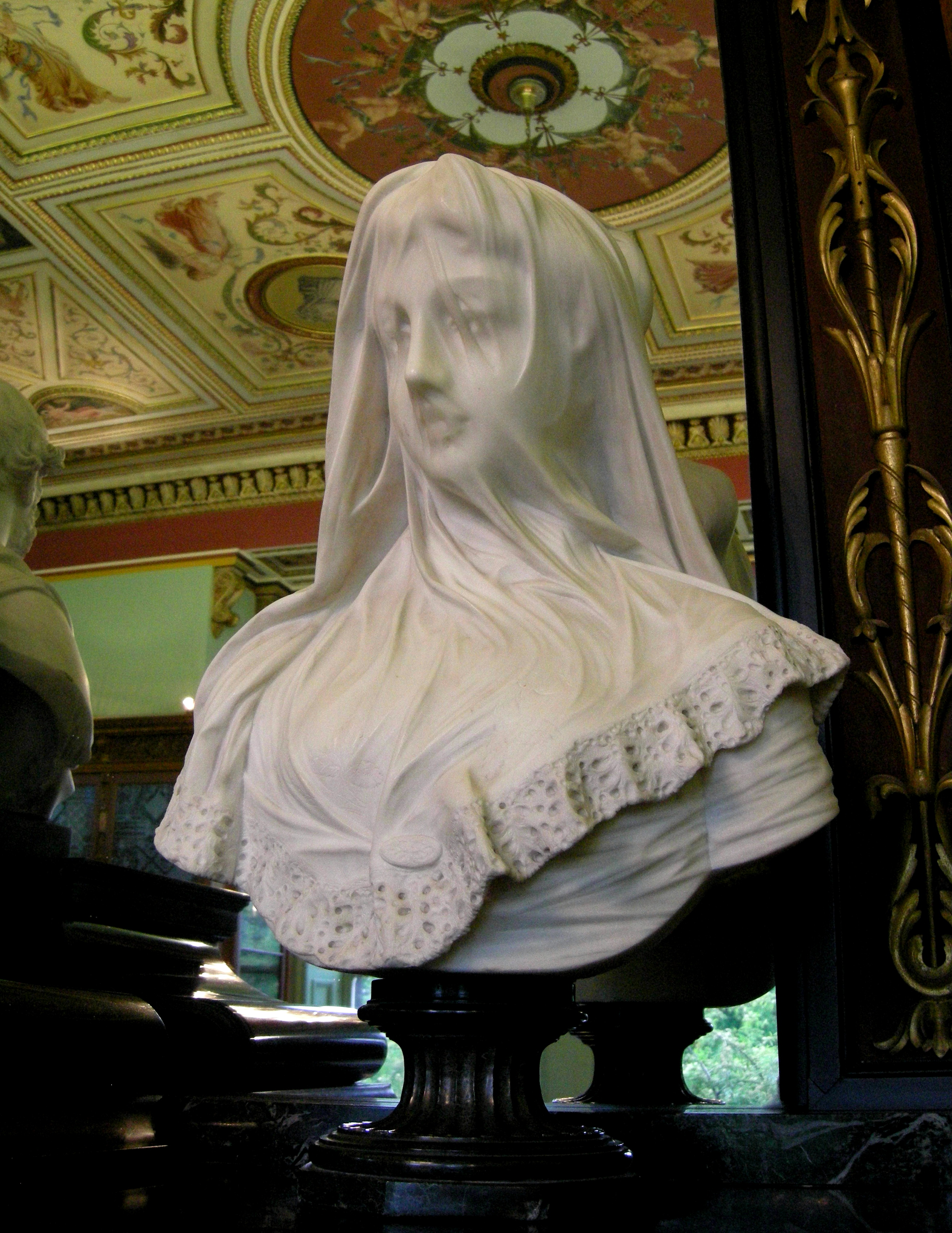
19th-century marble bust with apparently transparent veil, Bankfield Museum, Halifax, West Yorkshire.

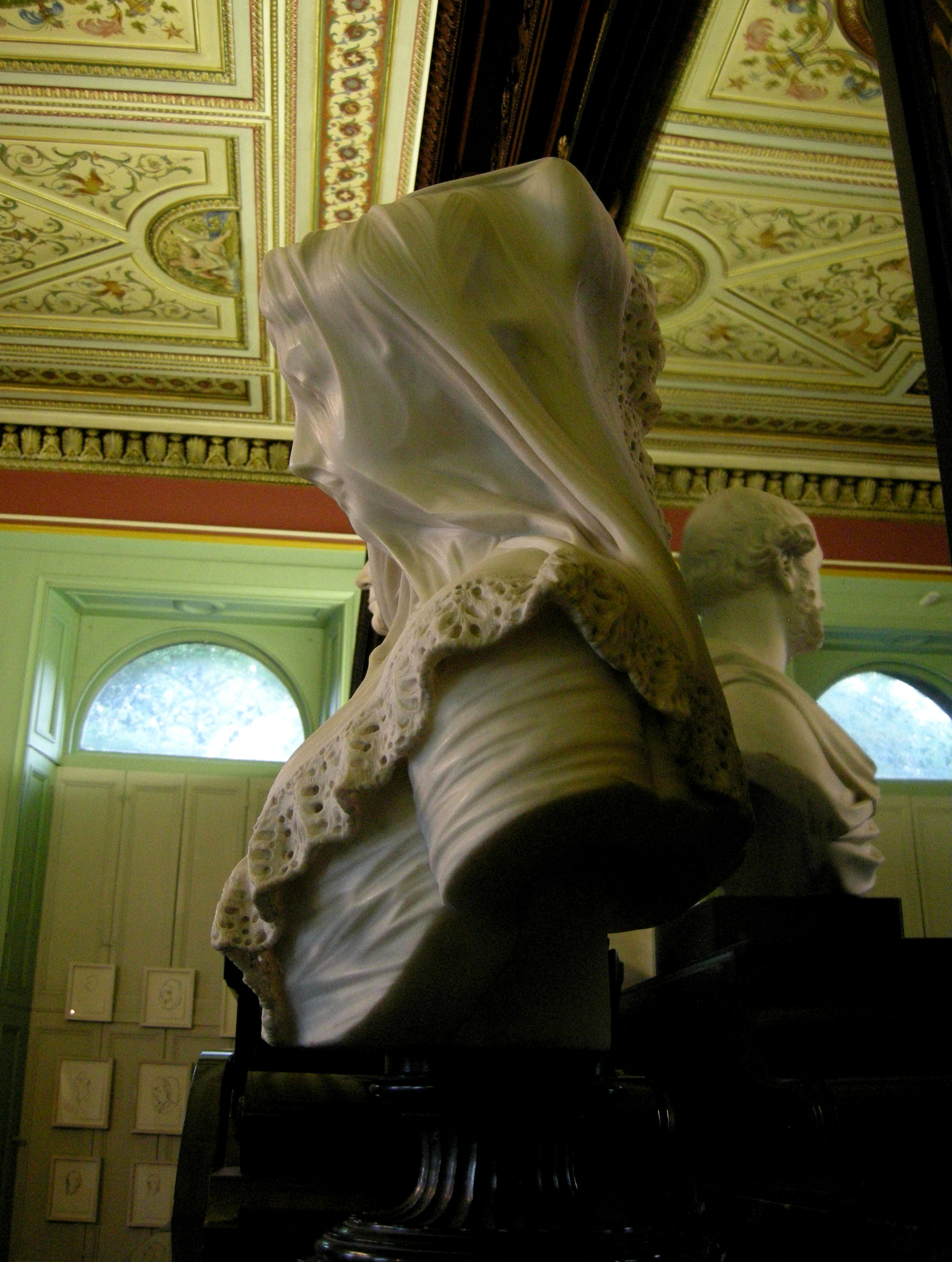
The same bust seen in profile. The effect is consistent from all angles and from close up.

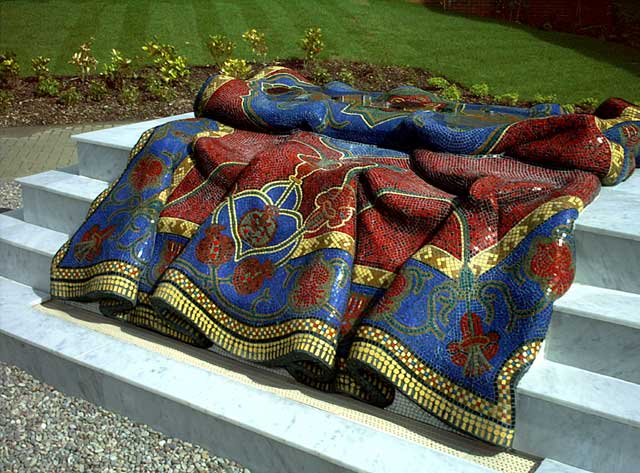
A modern trompe-l'œil mosaic fountain at Brighton, in the form of a carpet thrown over marble steps.

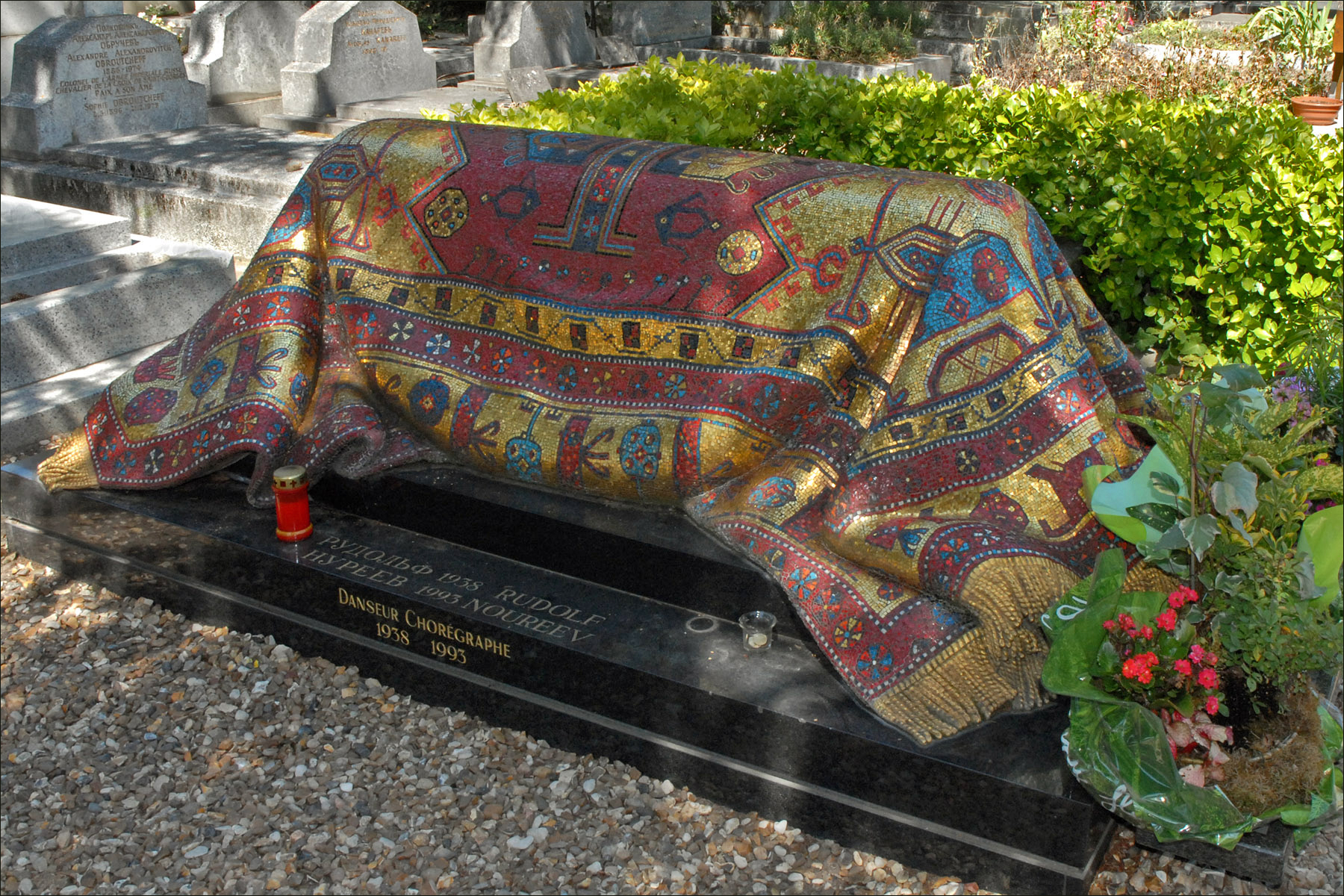
Tomb of Rudolf Nureyev draped in a mosaic oriental carpet sculpture.

== Architecture ==
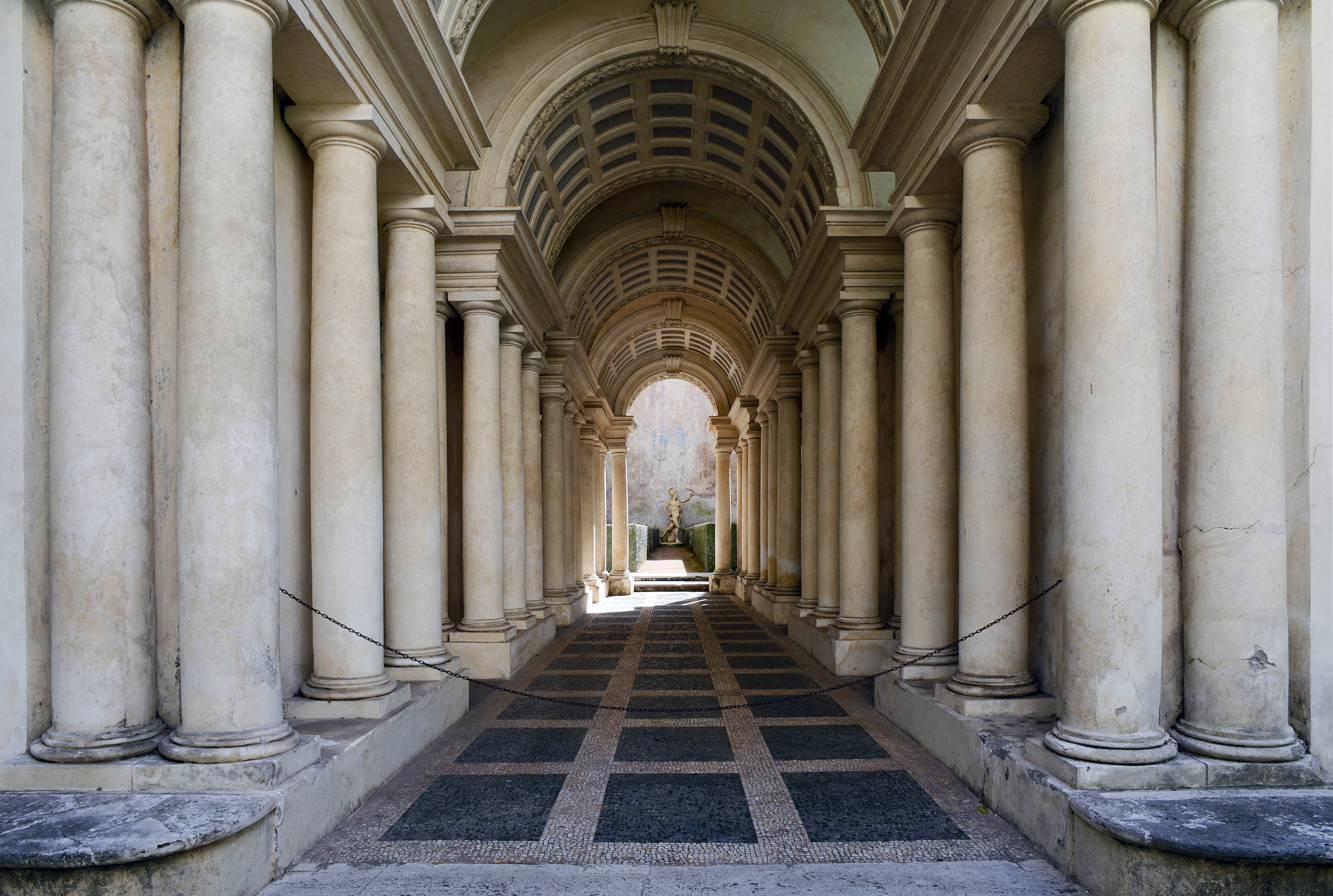
Architectural trompe-l'œil in the Palazzo Spada, Rome, by Francesco Borromini

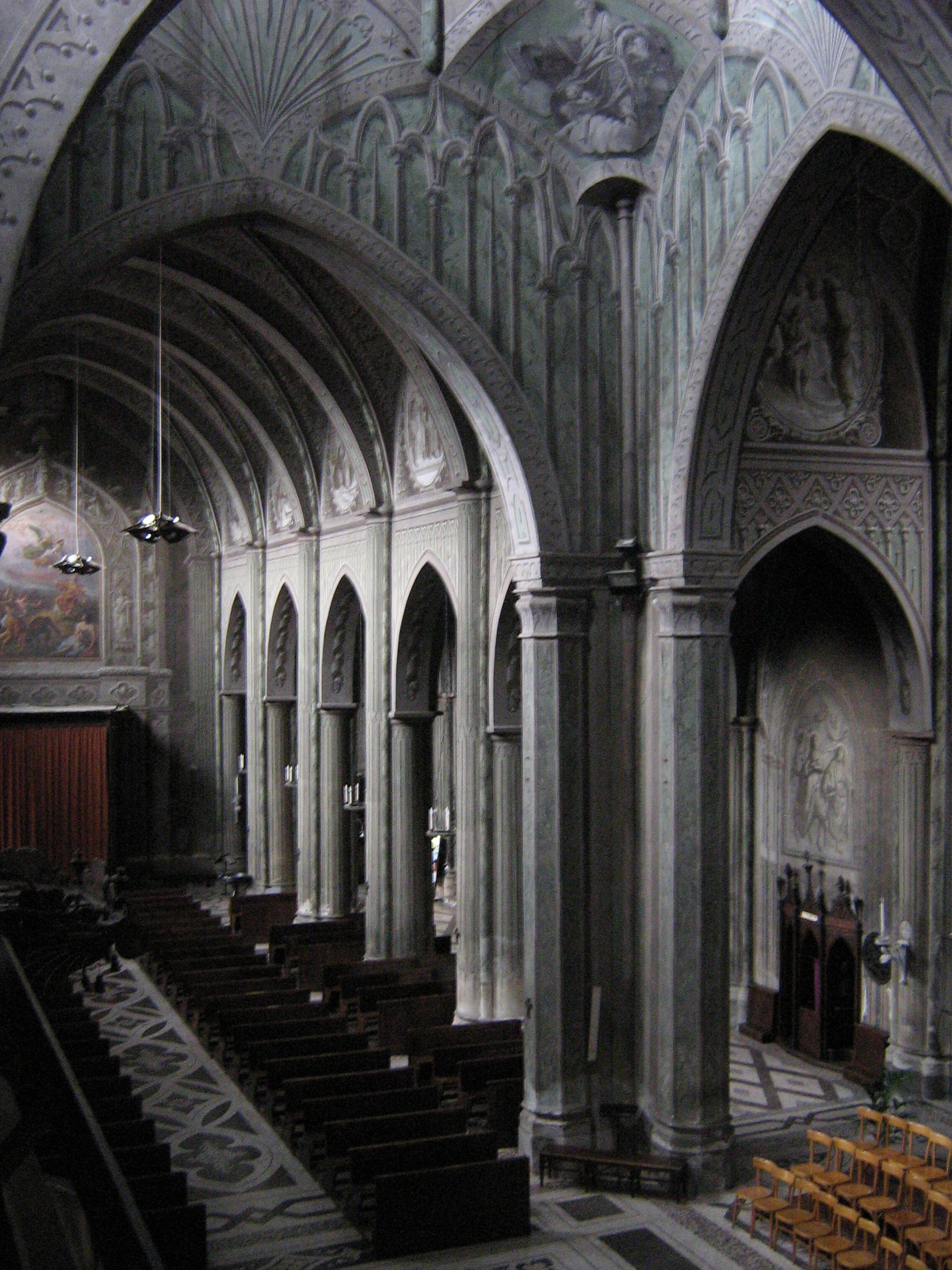
The interior of the cathedral in Biella (Italy) is considered a masterpiece of trompe-l'œil

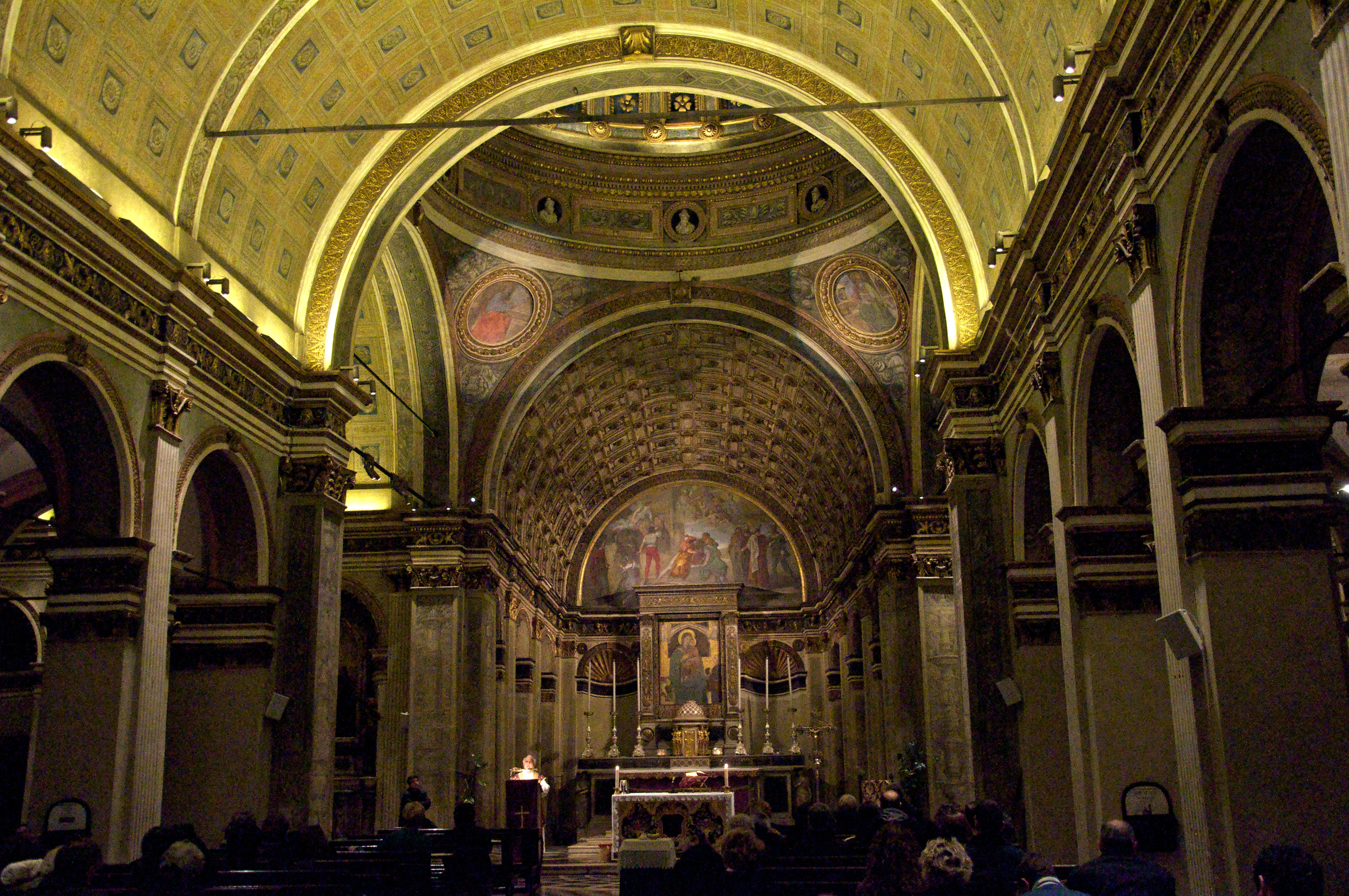
The interior of Santa Maria presso San Satiro, Milan viewed from the nave

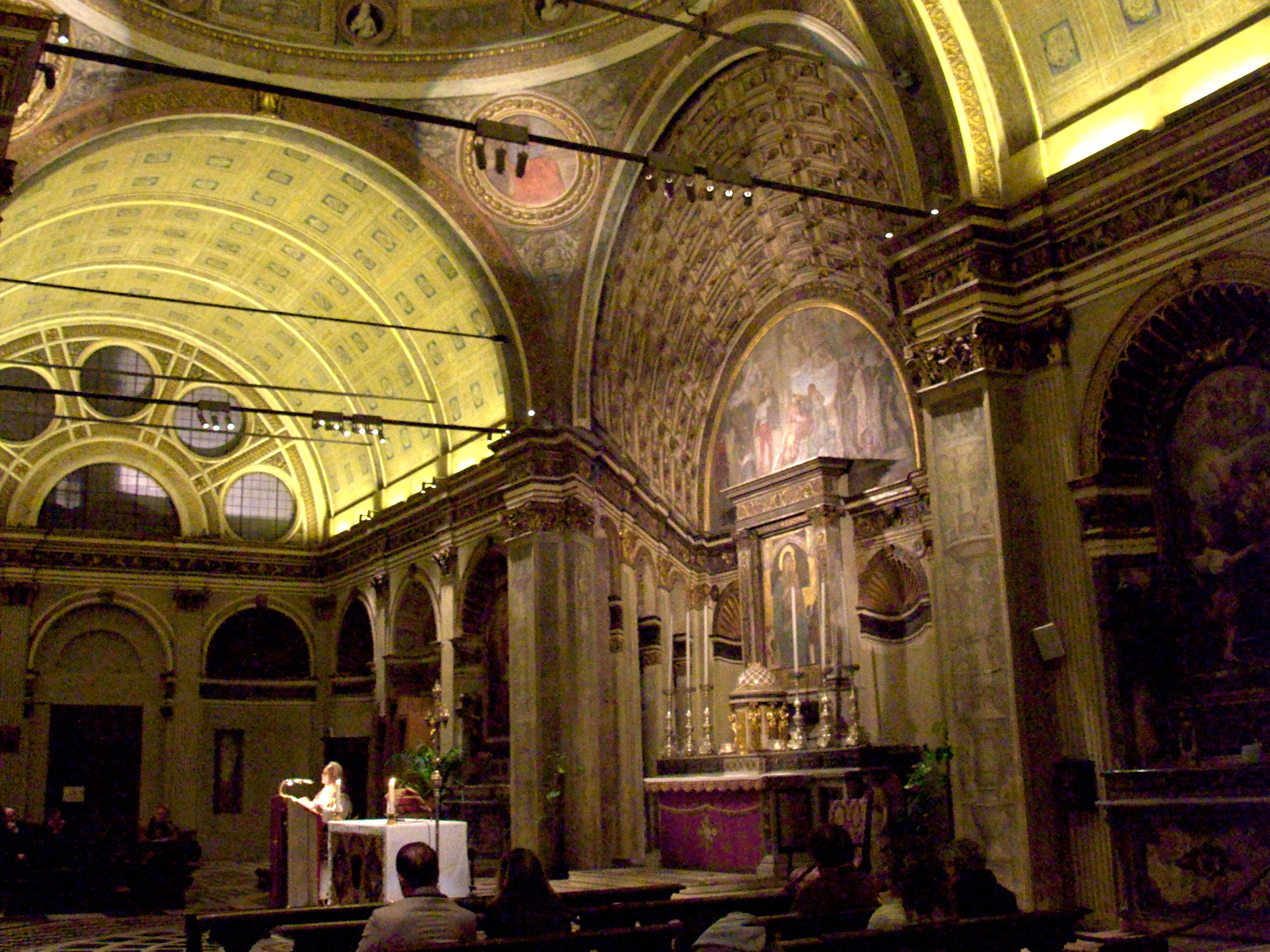
The trompe-l'œil choir at Santa Maria presso San Satiro, by Donato Bramante, viewed from the side

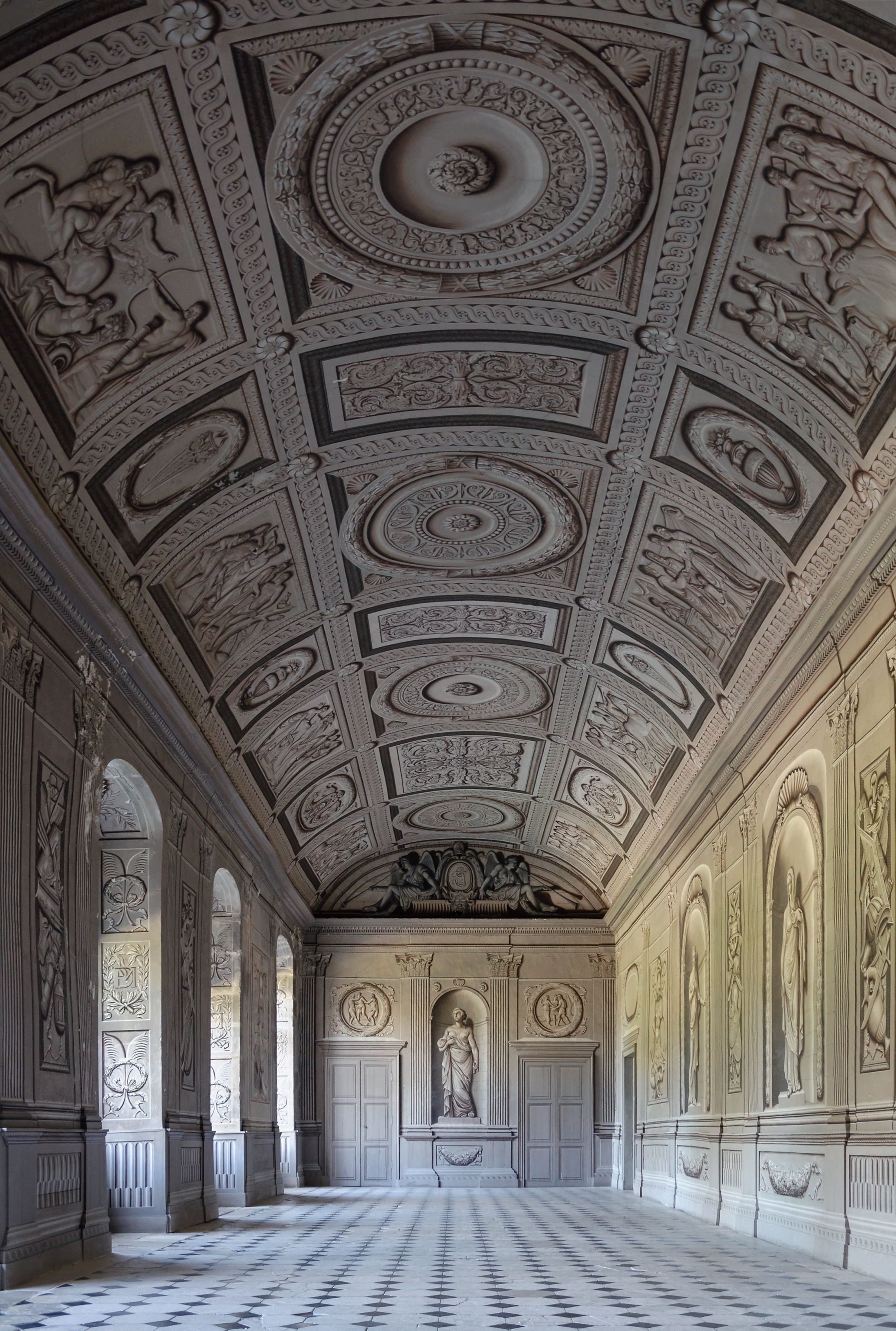
Gallery painted in trompe-l'œil in the Château de Tanlay, France

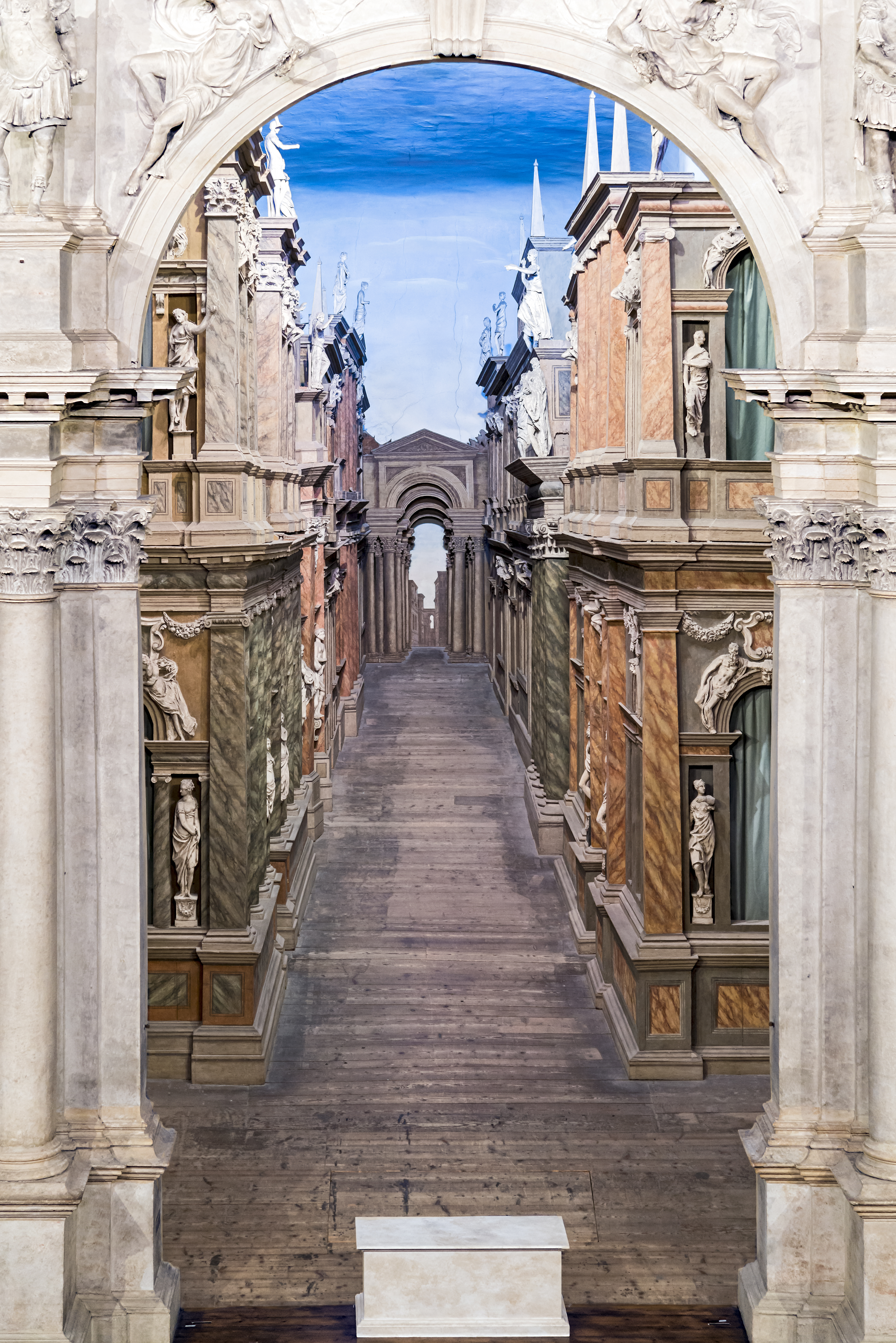
Detail of the forced perspective stage scenery of the Teatro Olimpico, as viewed through the porta reggia of the scaenae frons, Vicenza, northern Italy

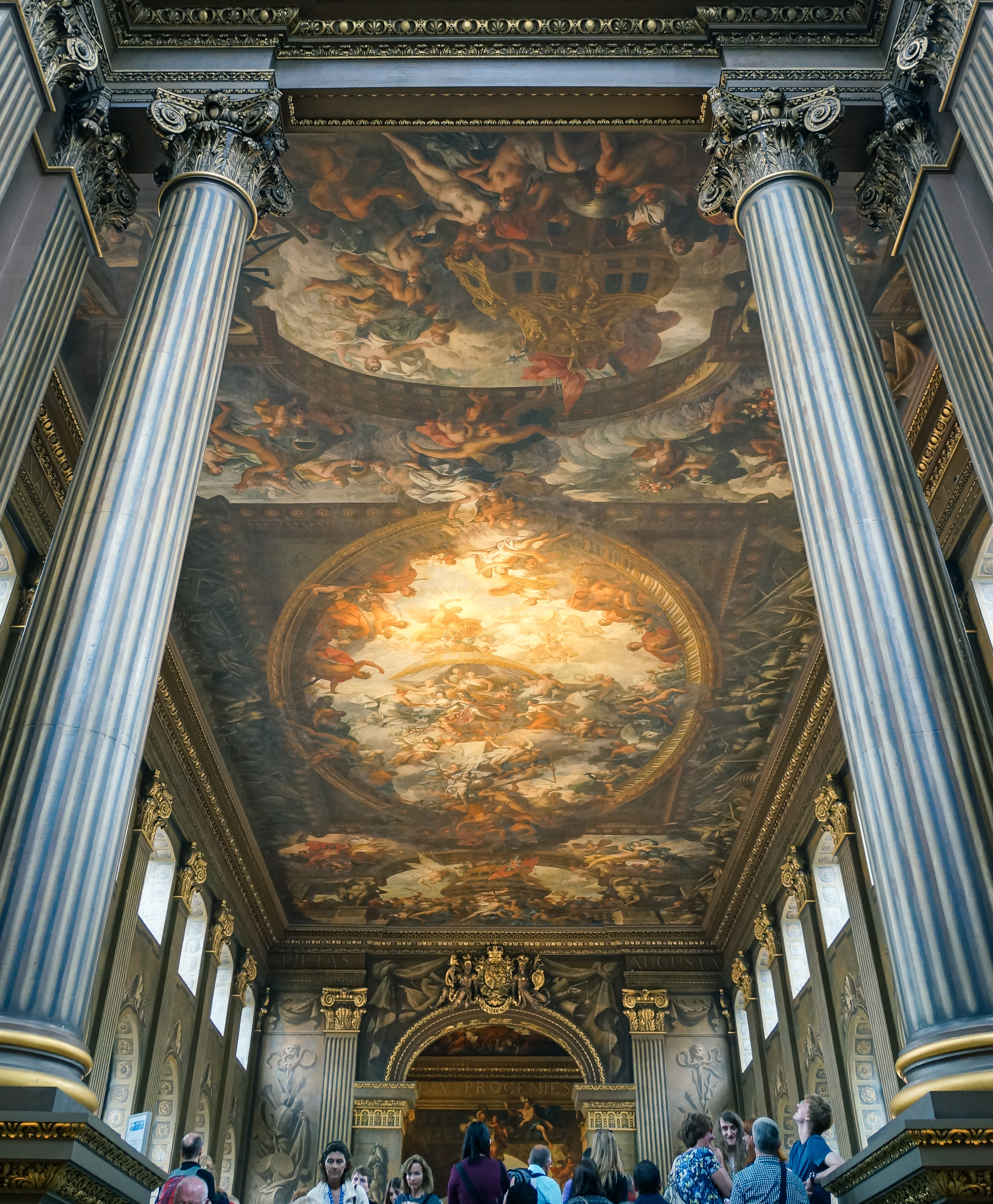
The Painted Hall at the Old Royal Naval College in Greenwich, London, England, designed by Sir Christopher Wren and Nicholas Hawksmoor. The paintings by Sir James Thornhill comprise architectural trompe-l'œil; for instance, the Corinthian columns look fluted whilst the far wall depicts pilasters and an entablature. In practice none of these elements exist in three dimensions

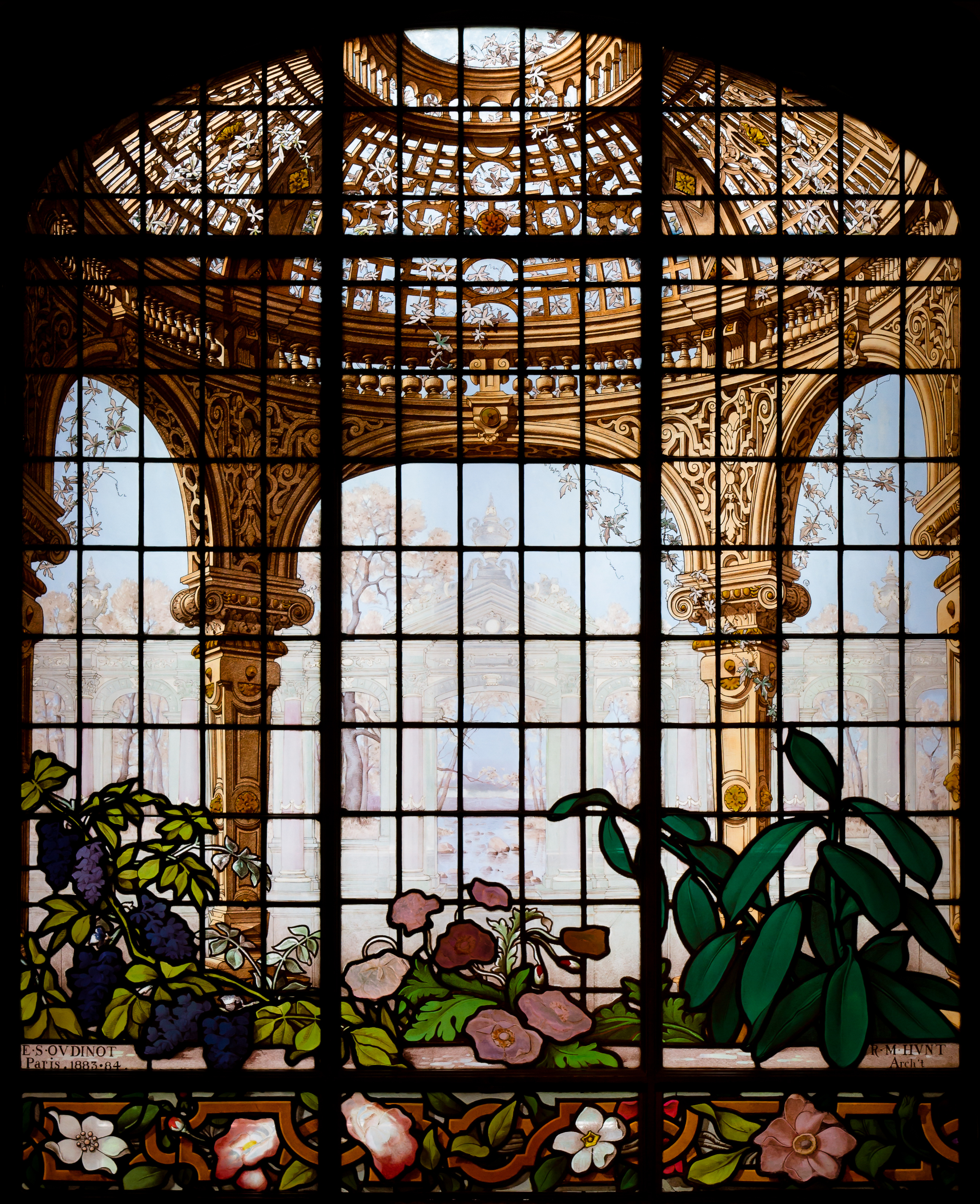
19th-century stained-glass window made for the Henry Gurdon Marquand's mansion in New York

== Use in films ==
- Singin' in the Rain (1952)
- Willy Wonka & the Chocolate Factory (1971)
- Indiana Jones and the Last Crusade (1989)
- Where the Heart Is (1990)
- Millennium Actress (2001)
- Eternal Sunshine of the Spotless Mind (2004)
- The Sopranos (Season 5, Episode 8) (2004)
- Bewitched (2005)
- Westworld (Season 1, Episode 7) (2016)

== See also ==
- 2.5D—enhancement of 2-dimensional graphics by limited application of some 3D effects to them
- Accidental viewpoint
- Anamorphosis
- Bump mapping, normal mapping and parallax mapping—graphical techniques used to add fake details that enhance 2D representations of 3D objects (in the context of that branch of computer graphics that aims to give a realistic 3D view on the screen)
- Camouflage
- Faux painting
- List of art techniques
- Marbling
- Photorealism
