= J. S. G. Boggs =

American artist (1955–2017)

- In his studio with a painting of a $100 bill
- Born: Stephen Litzner; January 16, 1955; Woodbury, New Jersey, U.S.
- Died: January 22, 2017 (aged 62); Tampa, Florida, U.S.

James Stephen George Boggs (January 16, 1955 – January 22, 2017) was an American artist, best known for his hand-drawn depictions of banknotes. Due to his pre-Bitcoin philosophical questions about the value of fiat currency, his early interest in creating his own currency, and his contributions to an "encrypted online currency" as early as 2000, Boggs is described as the Patron Saint of Cryptocurrency.

== Early life ==
Boggs was born Stephen Litzner on January 16, 1955, in Woodbury, New Jersey. He attended Brandon High School in Brandon, Florida, but was expelled in his junior year.

== Art career ==
Boggs began drawing currency as artwork in 1984, when a Chicago waitress accepted his drawing of "a very abstract one dollar bill" in payment for his 90¢ diner tab. When she returned 10¢ in change, Boggs felt "electricity" from the exchange and was inspired to conduct more such transactions with his original art.

His drawings of currency, depicting only a single side of the note, came to be known as "Boggs notes". Boggs notes were both art objects and part of a performance. Boggs would exchange the notes only for their face value: when he drew a $100 bill, he exchanged it for $100 worth of goods. He then sold any change he received, the receipt, and sometimes the goods he purchased as his "artwork", typically to art dealers and collectors. Boggs would tell a collector where he spent the note and the details of the transaction, but he did not sell the notes into the art market directly. The buyer would then track down the person in possession of the note in order to purchase it. Boggs noted that after the initial transaction the notes would be resold for much more than their face value, with one Boggs note reportedly being resold for $420,000.

One of his better-known works is a series of bills done for the Florida United Numismatists' annual convention. Denominations from $1 to $50 (and perhaps higher) feature designs taken from the reverse sides of contemporary U.S. currency, modified slightly through the changing of captions (notably, "The United States of America" is changed to "Florida United Numismatists" and the denomination wording is occasionally replaced by the acronym "FUN") and visual details (the mirroring of Monticello on the $2, the Supreme Court building, as opposed to the U.S. Treasury, on the $10 and an alternate angle for the White House on the $20). They were printed in bright orange on one side and featured Boggs' autograph and thumbprint on the other.

Other works of money art that he designed include the mural All the World's a Stage, roughly based on a Bank of England Series D £20 note and featuring Shakespearean themes, as well as banknote-sized creations that depict Boggs' ideas as to what U.S. currency should look like. A $100 bill featuring Harriet Tubman is one known example.

Boggs and his work are chronicled in Boggs: A Comedy of Values, by Lawrence Weschler, published by the University of Chicago Press.

== Legality and arrests ==
Police bust Boggs at the Young Unknowns Gallery, London, 1986

Boggs viewed his "transactions" as a type of performance art, but the authorities often viewed them with suspicion. Boggs aimed to have his audience question and investigate just what it is that makes "money" valuable in the first place. He steadfastly denied being a counterfeiter or forger, rather maintaining that a good-faith transaction between informed parties is certainly not fraud, even if the item transacted happens to resemble negotiable currency.

Boggs was first arrested for counterfeiting in England in 1986. He was defended by the human rights lawyers Geoffrey Robertson QC and Mark Stephens and acquitted. As detailed in Robertson's book The Justice Game, all Bank of England notes now carry a copyright message on the face as a direct result of Boggs' activities, the idea being that if they cannot secure a counterfeiting charge, then they can at least secure a copyright violation. In 1989, one of the original £5 "bank notes" from the trial was included in the British Museum exhibition Fake? The Art of Deception; this item was added to the British Museum's permanent collection the following year, via donation by the artist himself. In 2022, this drawing went on public display in the British Museum's room 68 (the "Money Gallery") alongside one of Banksy's "Di-faced tenner" £10 notes.

He was arrested for a second time in Australia in 1989, acquitted and awarded the equivalent of US$20,000 in damages by the presiding judge.

Boggs' home was raided three times between 1990 and 1992 by the United States Secret Service on suspicion of counterfeiting. In the raids 1300 items were confiscated, although no legal case was brought against him.

== Death ==
Boggs died on January 22, 2017, in Tampa at the age of 62.

== Collections and exhibitions ==
Boggs' works are held in numerous collections, including:

- Art Institute of Chicago
- Smithsonian Institution
- Babson College, Wellesley, Massachusetts
- Norton Museum of Art, West Palm Beach, Florida
- Tampa Museum of Art, Tampa, Florida
- Spencer Museum of Art, Lawrence, Kansas
- British Museum, London, England
- Fitzwilliam Museum, Cambridge, England
- laCollection, Paris, France

== See also ==
Other money artists include

- Mark Wagner is an artist best known for meticulous collages made of United States banknotes
- William Harnett
- John F. Peto
- Tim Prusmack
- John Haberle, who made trompe-l'œil paintings of U.S. currency in the 1880s
- Otis Kaye, who made both paintings similar to Harnett, and also actual-size pen-and-ink drawings from the 1920s to the 1950s
- Emanuel Ninger (Jim the Penman), who drew counterfeit notes by hand, with the intent to defraud, in the 1880s
- Genpei Akasegawa
- Robin Clark
