= Otis Kaye =

American painter

Otis Kaye (1885–1974) was an American artist during the early 20th century. He is noted especially for trompe-l'œil paintings of U.S. currency.

== Life and work ==
Otis Kaye carried on the trompe-l'œil tradition of William Harnett, John Frederick Peto, and John Haberle, and is esteemed particularly for his works which include U.S. currency. Kaye, however, in addition to oils, created etchings, watercolors, and pastels, some including currency but others on varied themes.

Born in Dresden, Germany in 1885, Kaye came to Neemah, Michigan with his parents when he was only three years old. In 1904 he moved to New York for a short time and there discovered his passion for art. Kaye and his mother moved to Germany where he studied engineering. He returned to the United States around 1914 and worked successfully as an engineer in the Midwest until the stock market crash of 1929. He began painting trompe-l'œil oils in the tradition of the great 19th-century artists, William Harnett, Peto and Haberle. Many of these works include coins and bills. Because the United States enacted a ban on painting currency in 1909, Kaye did not sell his paintings but gave them as gifts to family members and close friends. He also created ink drawings of currency, and made etchings after Rembrandt, Whistler and Picasso, as well as other artists. He expanded on these prints with compositions of his own in ink and gouache.

Kaye created larger paintings which focused on diverse themes: the economy, in De Jia Vu; war, in Land of the Free; religion, in Joshua's Horn; art, in Rembrandt, What's Behind the Painting; and even baseball in What a Hit! In addition to money, Kaye's works sometimes include pistols and musical instruments and almost always show puns and humor. Art historian Bruce Chambers wrote, "we are now accustomed to identifying Otis Kaye by the ambitious scale, layered meanings, and impeccable craftmanship of his trompe l'oeil money paintings..."

Kaye lived in Illinois until just before his death in 1974 when he returned to Germany. Kaye never exhibited or sold his paintings during his lifetime. Beginning in the 1980s his works were sold at galleries and auctions in New York and quickly moved into public and private collections. In 2002 Kaye's prints were exhibited at the Federal Reserve Bank in Washington, DC. and published in Otis Kaye Trompe L'Oeil Master of Appropriation by Mary Anne Goley (2002).

Kaye's paintings and prints have been included in museum shows of American art in the United States and recently in Florence, Italy. The definitive catalog of Kaye's works, Otis Kaye: Money, Mystery and Mastery was published by New Britain Museum of American Art for an exhibition in 2015.
