= In the Library =

Painting by John F. Peto

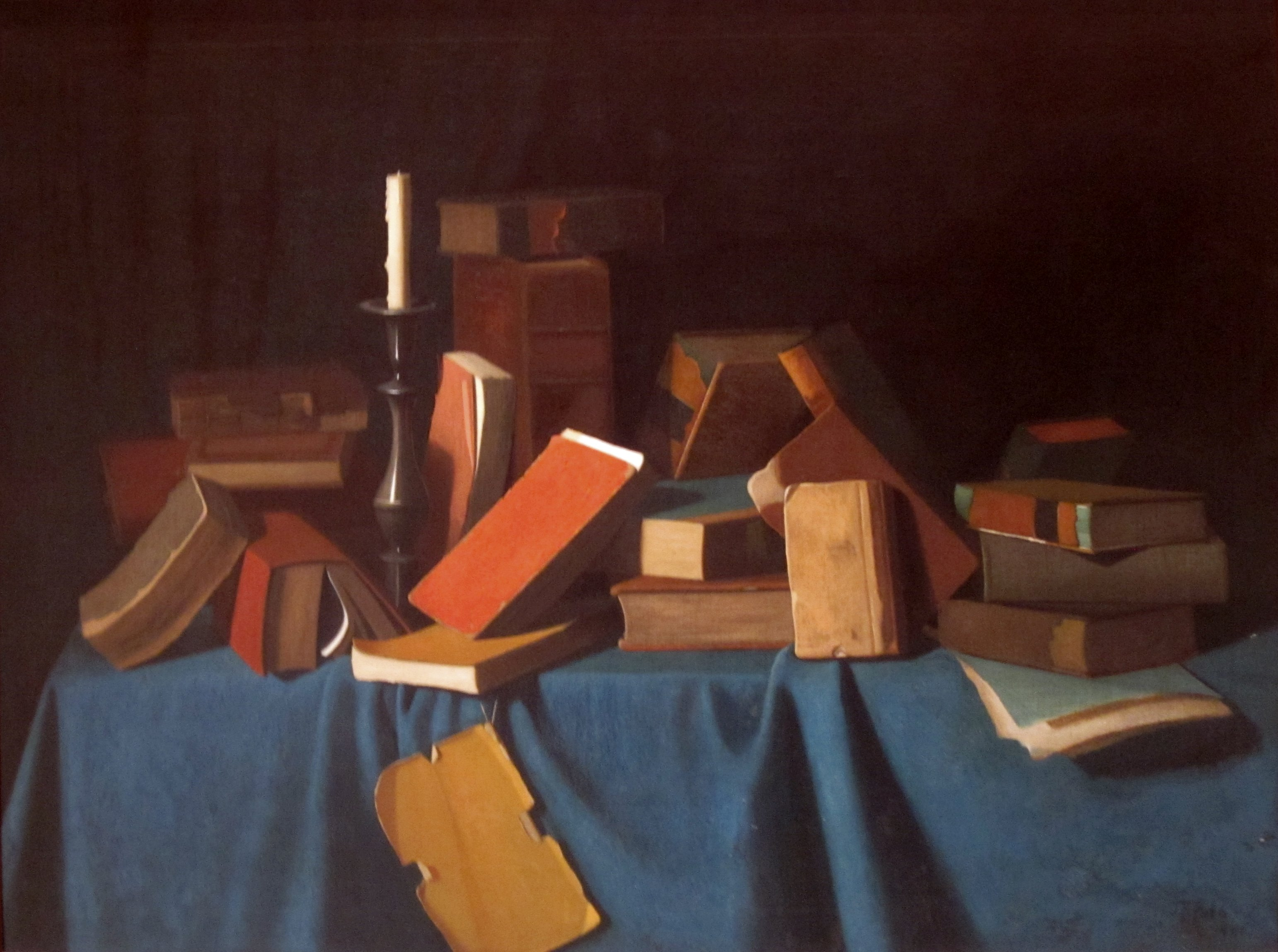
- Artist: John F. Peto
- Location: Timken Museum of Art, San Diego, California, U.S.

In the Library is an 1894–1900 oil painting on canvas by John F. Peto.
