= Jefferson David Chalfant =

American painter (1856–1931)

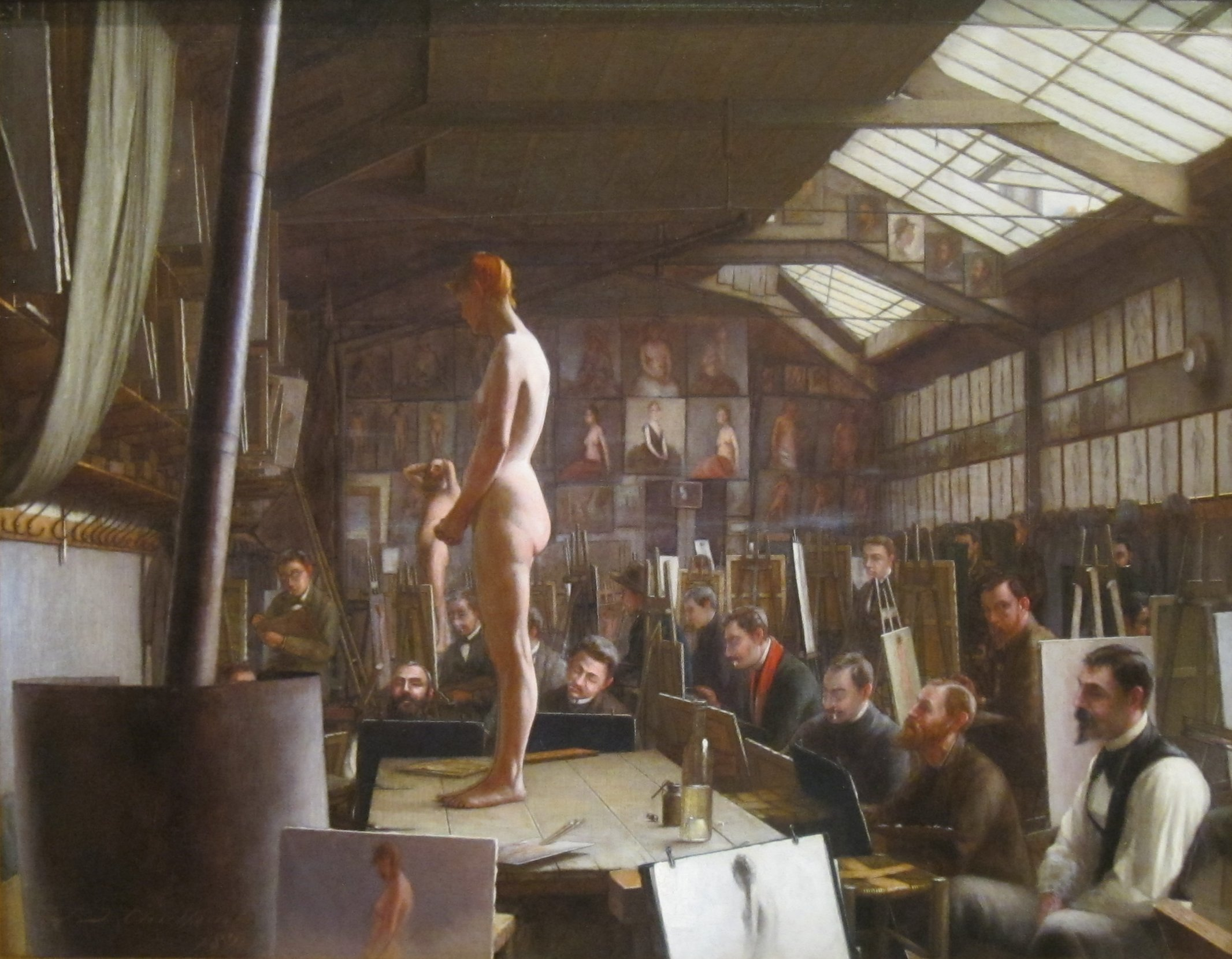
Bouguereau's Atelier – Chalfant painted himself into the picture; he is the figure in the lower right.

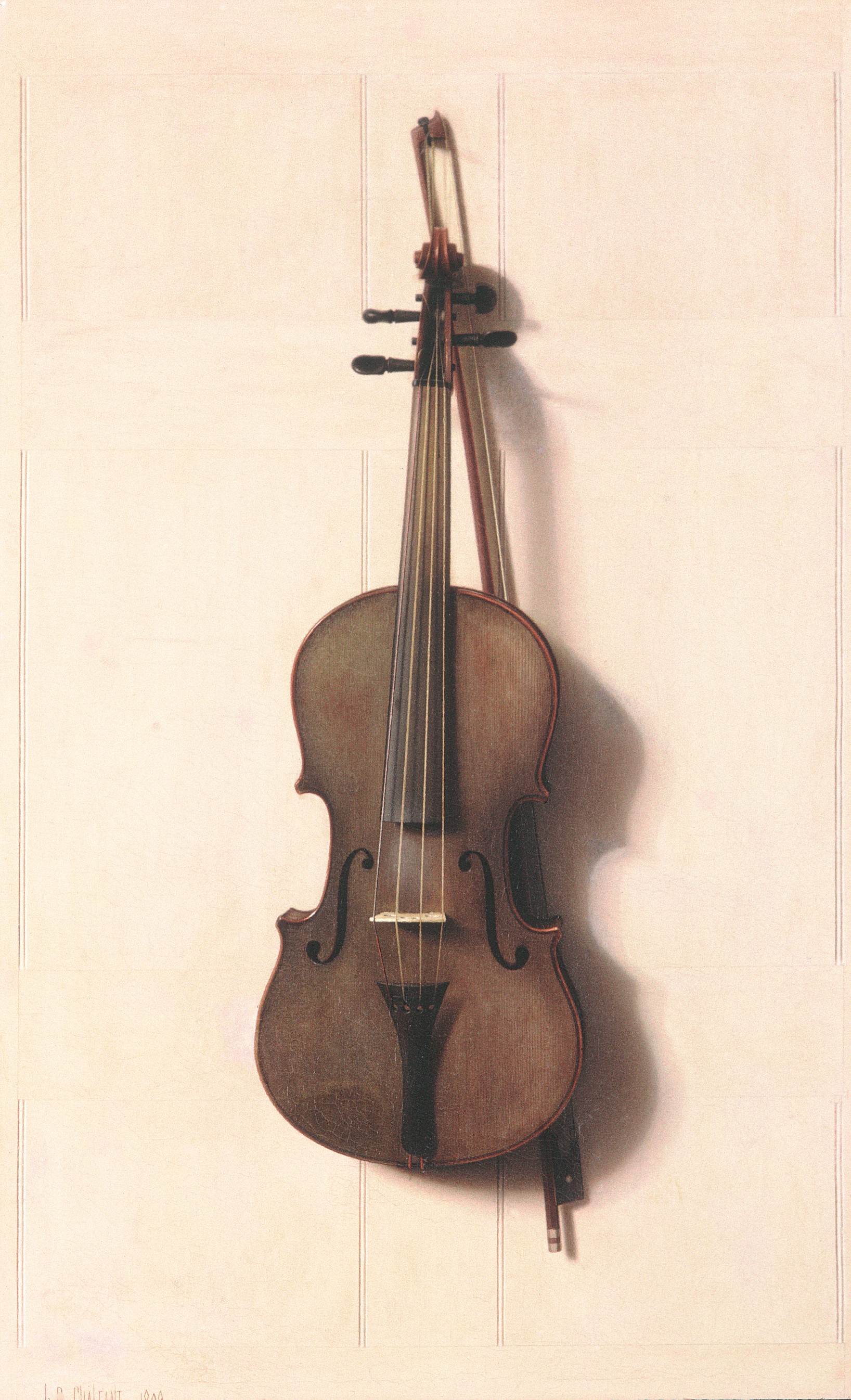
Violin and Bow (1889)

Jefferson David Chalfant (November 6, 1856 – February 3, 1931) was an American painter who is remembered mostly for his trompe-l'œil still life paintings.

== Biography ==
Chalfant was born in Chester County, Pennsylvania, but moved in young adulthood to Wilmington, Delaware, where he would spend the rest of his life. Employed by a commercial firm as a painter of parlor car interiors, he began his activity as a fine artist in the early 1880s. Although he had no formal training, he quickly developed a fine technique. His early works are mostly still-life and landscape paintings, which sold well to private collectors.

Chalfant exhibited at the Pennsylvania Academy of Fine Arts, the National Academy of Design, and elsewhere. In 1890, he was able to travel to Paris for two years, where he studied figure painting under Adolphe-William Bouguereau and Jules Joseph Lefebvre. This served him well during a career in which he painted genre, portraits and other subjects. His signal achievement may be his still lifes.

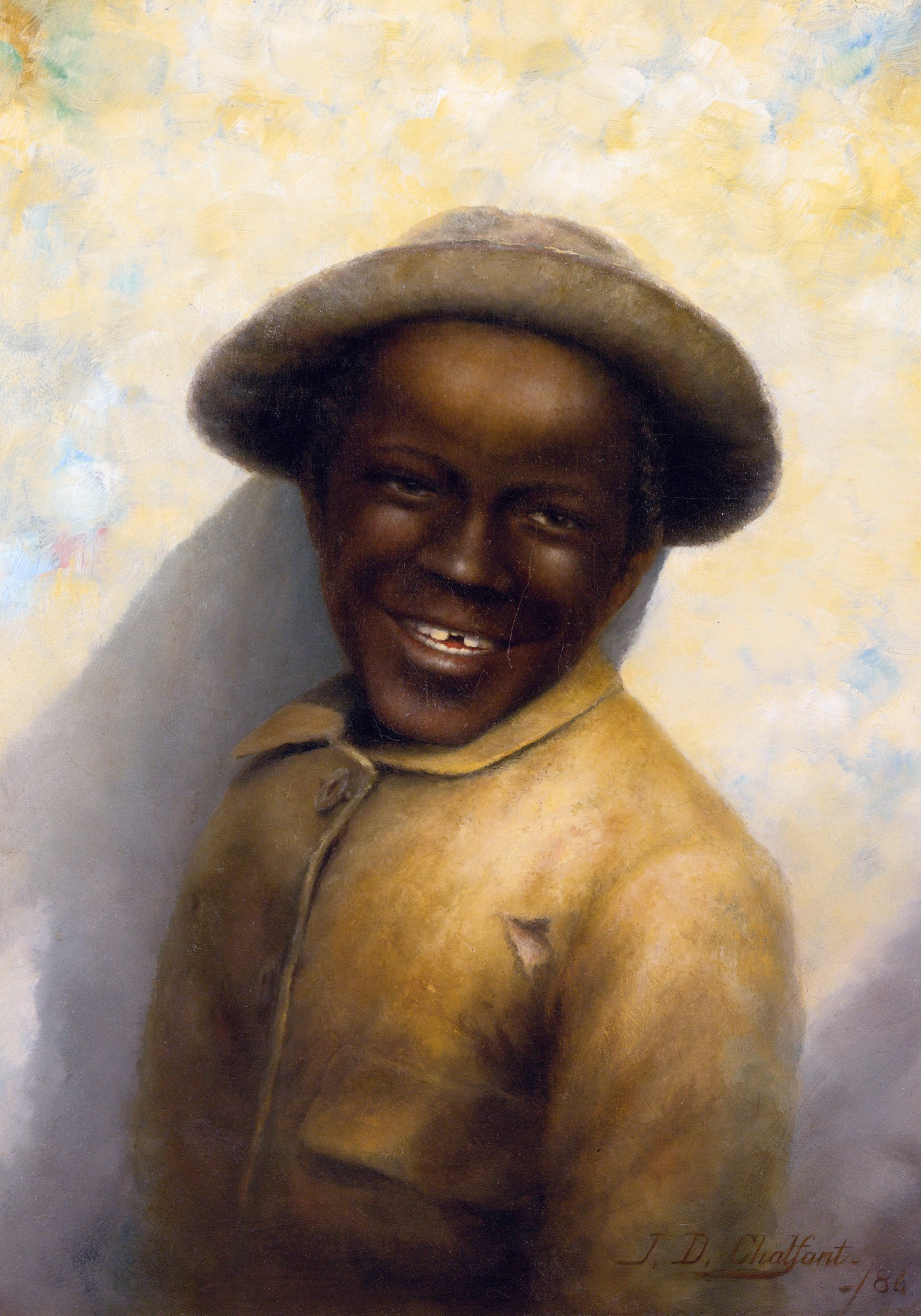
Smiling boy (1886)

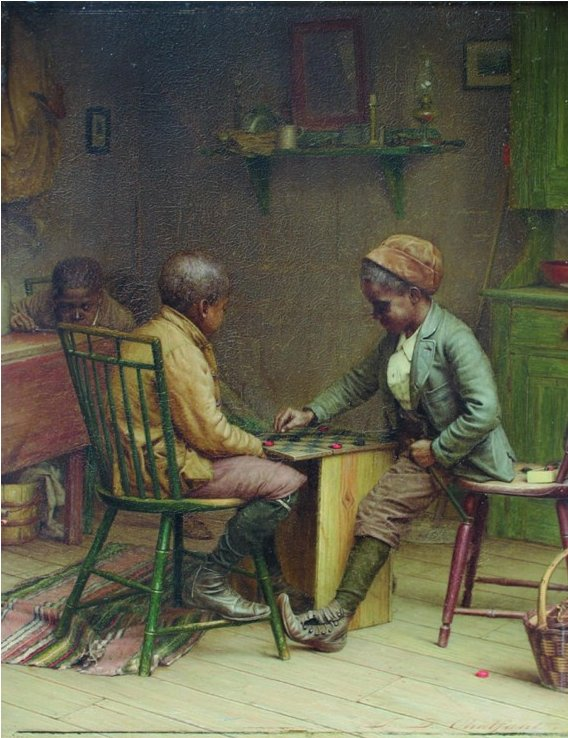
The Visiting Champion (c. 1895)

His still lifes are painted in the illusionistic trompe-l'œil (literally, "fool the eye") manner popularized in the late nineteenth century by William Michael Harnett. Harnett inspired many followers, the best known being John F. Peto, but few, if any, had Chalfant's technical finesse. Often, Chalfant's compositions closely follow prototypes by Harnett, but Chalfant usually simplifies, eliminating secondary objects and details. An example is his Violin and Bow (1889) in the Metropolitan Museum of Art (MET).

Although he was only slightly younger than Harnett and Peto, he outlived both of them by many years, and continued painting until 1927, when he had a stroke. He died in Wilmington in 1931.

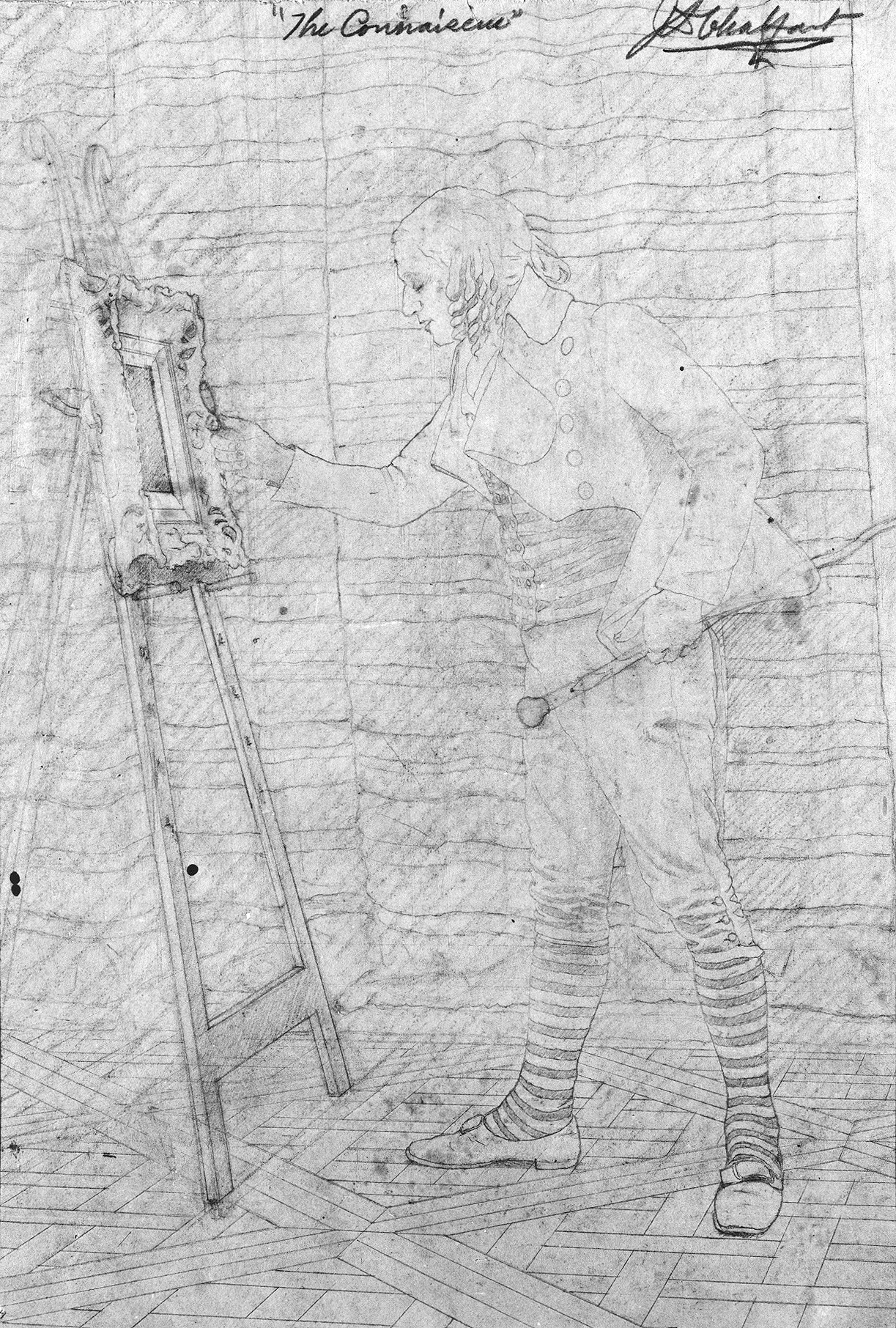
The Connoisseur, graphite on paper

A 2022 exhibition at the MET draws comparisons between the work of Chalfant, Harnet (as well as European trompe-l'œil painters such as Samuel van Hoogstraten, Cornelius Norbertus Gijsbrechts, Jean Etienne Liotard, and Luis Meléndez) and the work of Georges Braque, Juan Gris, and Pablo Picasso. One example is Chalafant's Which is Which, a highly realistic oil painting of a postage stamp with collage elements including an actual postage stamp and a fictitious printed newspaper clipping, hints at Cubism as well as foreshadowing the use of "faux collage" and fake news.

== Bibliography ==
- Frankenstein, Alfred (1970). The Reality of Appearance. Greenwich: New York Graphic Society. ISBN 0-8212-0357-6
- Wilmerding, John (1983). Important Information Inside. New York: Harper & Row. ISBN 0-06-438941-3
