= Prusmack =

Prusmack is a surname. Notable people with the surname include:

- Florence Prusmack (1920–2013), American author
- Jon Prusmack (?–2018), American rugby player and businessman
