= Moneygami =

Folding paper money into figures

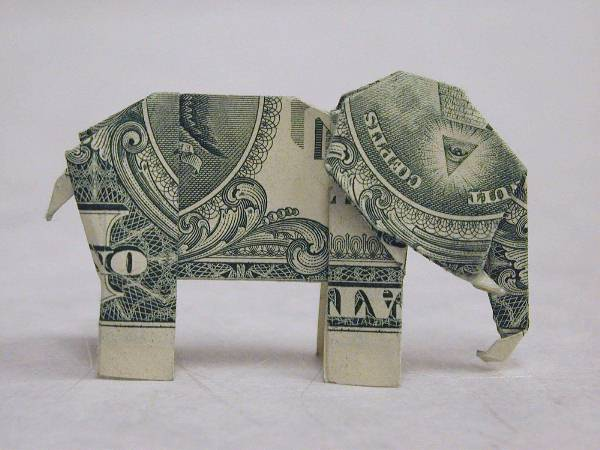
This elephant is an example of origami work made using paper currency.

Moneygami (also known as money-gami) is the shaping of paper currency, such as Indian rupees or United States dollars, into pieces of art. The word is a portmanteau of money and origami.

The concept has been popularized by individuals such as Japanese pop artist Yosuke Hasegawa, who has had his work featured at an exhibition at the Tadu Art Gallery, and its creation can function as cultural commentary on the value that materialistic societies place on money. For example, one piece by Hasegawa involves Chairman Mao Zedong's folded head wearing a cowboy hat in a double image, based on Andy Warhol's famous picture of Elvis Presley.

The name alludes to traditional origami, which is the Japanese art of folding flat materials, generally paper, into figures resembling various objects. Other examples of moneygami include folding bills into clothing-like items, such as dollar bills becoming bowties.

== See also ==
- List of people on banknotes
- Miniatures
- Pop art
- Mark Wagner, an artist who makes collages out of banknotes
