= John Haberle =

American painter

John Haberle (1856–1933) was an American painter in the trompe-l'œil (literally, "fool the eye") style. His still lifes of ordinary objects are painted in such a way that the painting can be mistaken for the objects themselves. He is considered one of the three major figures—together with William Harnett and John F. Peto—practicing this form of still life painting in the United States in the last quarter of the 19th century. He is especially noted for his depictions of paper objects, including currency, which he continued to paint despite warnings from the Secret Service.

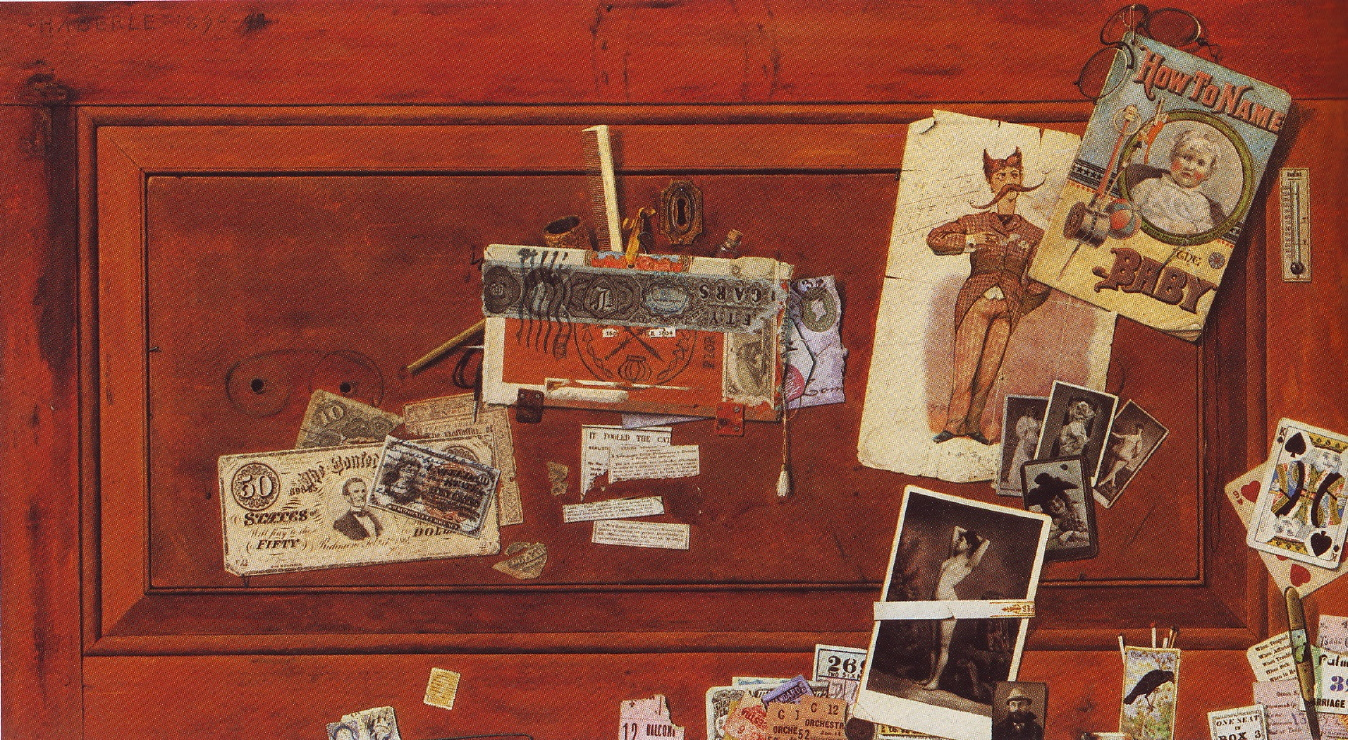
A Bachelor's Drawer by John Haberle, 1890–1894, oil on canvas, 50.8 x 91.4 cm, Metropolitan Museum of Art

== Early life and training ==
Haberle was born in 1856 in New Haven, Connecticut, and was the son of Swabian immigrants. At the age of 14 he left school to apprentice with an engraver. He also worked for many years as an illustrator and exhibit preparator for the Peabody Museum of Natural History at Yale University, working under the supervision of the paleontologist Othniel Charles Marsh. Haberle began taking classes at the National Academy of Design in New York City in 1884, where he first encountered trompe-l'œil painting.

== Career ==
Haberle's style is characterized by a meticulous rendering of two-dimensional objects. He is especially noted for his depictions of paper objects, including currency. Art historian Alfred Frankenstein has contrasted Haberle's work with that of his contemporaries:

Peto is moved by the pathos of used-up things. Haberle is wry and wacky, full of bravado, self-congratulating virtuosity, and sly flamboyance. He works largely within an old tradition, that of the trompe-l'œil still life in painted line ... It is poles away from Harnett's sumptuosity, careful balances, and well-modeled volumes, and is equally far from Peto's sensitivity in matters of tone and hue.

A Bachelor's Drawer (1890–1894) is typical of his approach: various papers, including currency, postage stamps, photos, playing cards, tickets, and newspaper clippings, are shown affixed to an essentially planar surface. Other objects—eyeglasses, a comb, a pipe, matches, and so on—are shallow enough in volume so as not to spoil the illusion.

Like Harnett, he was warned by the Secret Service to cease and desist painting paper money, but he continued to do so throughout his years of greatest productivity; examples include The Changes of Time (1888) and Can You Break a Five? (c. 1885). He painted other subjects such as Slate (c. 1895), a bin of peanuts in Fresh Roasted (1887), The Clay Pipe (1889), and the huge Grandma's Hearthstone (1890), in the collection of the Detroit Institute of Arts.

Over the course of his career, Haberle exhibited work at art institutions such as the National Academy of Design in New York and the Pennsylvania Academy of the Fine Arts in Philadelphia. Due to the popular appeal of Haberle's style and subject matter, his work was also shown in venues not conventionally known for displaying art, such as bookstores, saloons, liquor stores, and hotels.

By 1893, eye problems caused Haberle to move away from making detailed work, although he continued to paint. Among his later works are paintings of flowers executed in a looser style, and in 1909 he painted his final trompe-l'œil, the large Night, in the collection of the New Britain Museum of American Art, New Britain, Connecticut. Haberle died in 1933 in New Haven, Connecticut.

Following some decades of obscurity after his death, Haberle's oeuvre of some forty trompe l'oeil paintings was later identified and reevaluated by the art historian Alfred Frankenstein.
