= Mark Wagner (artist) =

American artist using banknotes

- Born: 1976 (age 49–50)
- Education: University of Wisconsin–Madison
- Known for: Currency collage
- Notable work: Ben Bernanke (2009); Liberty (2009)
- Website: www.markwagnerinc.com

Mark Wagner (born 1976) is an American artist best known for meticulous collages made of United States banknotes, such as the portrait of Federal Reserve Bank Chairman Ben Bernanke, composed exclusively of one-dollar bills, in the collection of the Smithsonian Institution's National Portrait Gallery. He is co-founder of The Booklyn Artist Alliance and has published over twenty artists’ books with Bird Brain Press and X-ing Books.

== Currency collage ==
Since 1999, Wagner has been using US banknotes to create portraits, abstractions, allegories, still lifes, and sculptures ranging in size from 2x3 inch smiling and frowning parodies of Gilbert Stuart’s portrait of George Washington on the dollar, to the 17x3 feet Liberty, a 2009 depiction of the Statue of Liberty using slices from over 1000 dollar bills. Lisa Dennison, Chief Curator of the Solomon R. Guggenheim Museum in New York City commends Wagner's “witty and intricately detailed” work and situates his art in the longstanding tradition of artists like Ed Ruscha who adapt pre-existing resources to create uniquely engaging works of art. Detractors say the work can lean towards the gimmicky.

== Collections ==
- Bibliothèque nationale de France, Paris
- Boston Public Library, Boston, MA
- Brooklyn Museum of Art, Brooklyn, NY
- Corcoran Gallery of Art, Washington, DC
- Getty Center for the History of Art and Humanities, Los Angeles, CA
- Library of Congress, Washington, DC
- Metropolitan Museum of Art, NYC
- Minneapolis Institute of Art, Minneapolis, MN
- Museum of Modern Art (MoMA), NYC
- New York Public Library, NYC
- Rhode Island School of Design, Providence, RI
- San Francisco Museum of Modern Art, San Francisco, CA
- Smithsonian Institution, Washington, DC
- Stanford University, Palo Alto, CA
- Walker Art Center, Minneapolis, MN
- Whitney Museum of American Art, NYC

== Exhibitions ==
Wagner has had a number of solo exhibitions and participated in many group exhibitions.

- Pavel Zoubok Gallery, NYC (2013, 2011, 2008) - solo exhibitions
- Central Academy of Fine Arts Museum, Beijing, China (2012)
- National Portrait Gallery, Smithsonian Institution, Washington, DC (2011)
- Ronald Feldman Fine Art, NYC (2010)
- Walker Art Center, Minneapolis, MN (2009)
- Albright-Knox Art Gallery, Buffalo, NY (2009)
- FLAG Art Foundation, NYC (2008)
- Getty Center for the History of Art and Humanities, Los Angeles, CA (2005)
- Renaissance Society / University of Chicago, IL (2004)
- Parsons School of Design, NYC (2003) - solo exhibition
- Yale University, New Haven, CT (2002)
- Brooklyn Museum of Art, NY (2000)
- Metropolitan Museum of Art, NYC (2000)

== Publication ==
- Pacific Standard Magazine, "The King of Cash," cover image, Nov., 2013
- WSJ Money Magazine, "A Yen for Art,” Mar. 9, 2013
- Harvard Business Review Russia, cover image and artwork, United Press, 2012
- The Baffler, No 19, artwork, MIT Press, Mar. 2012
- New York State lottery advertising campaign, “Money Multiplier,” Nov. 2012
- Wall Street Journal, "Mark Wagner: Give Me Liberty or Give Me Death" Lance Esplund, Aug. 6, 2011
- Huffington Post, "The New Moneyed Art" Adrian Brune, Aug. 4, 2011
- "Paper Promises," novel by Philip Coggan, cover image, Penguin UK, 2011
- Hyperallergic, "The Phantoms of Liberty" Howard Hurst, Jul. 13, 2011
- Newsweek, cover image, "The Capitalist Manifesto," Fareed Zakaria, Jun. 22, 2009
- Harpers Magazine, "Infinite Debt," Thomas Geoghegan, Apr. 2009
- Morning News, "Million Dollar Babies," Nicole Pasulka, Apr. 6, 2009
- New York Times, "Collages Go to College, And Behave Accordingly,” Benj. Genocchio, Dec. 16, 2007
- The New York Times, "Money Changes Everything,” Ken Johnson, Jul. 14, 2006
- Chicago Reader, "Well-Worn Text," Nov. 29, 1996

== Other coverage ==
- nydailynews.com
- http://www.huffingtonpost.com/adrian-margaret-brune/the-new-moneyed-art_b_918483.html?
- http://hyperallergic.com/29363/the-phantoms-of-liberty/
- http://paradigmmagazine.com/2011/12/12/paradigm-magazine-mark-wagner-interview/
- http://blog.library.si.edu/2012/07/concealed-in-the-rising-smoke/#.UqSRJiecxBk
- http://www.worldcat.org/search?q=au%3ABird+Brain+Press.&qt=hot_author
- http://www.thisiscolossal.com/2013/08/mark-wagner-currency/

== See also ==
- Statue of Liberty in popular culture
- J. S. G. Boggs
- Moneygami – Folding paper money into figures
