= Edwin Weyburn Goodwin =

American painter

- Born: October 1800; Ovid, New York
- Died: September 13, 1845 (aged 44); Ithaca, New York
- Occupations: Artist, portrait painter
- Spouse(s): Almira Ives, Almira LaBarre
- Children: Richard La Barre Goodwin

Edwin Weyburn Goodwin (October 1800 – September 13, 1845) was an American itinerant miniature and portrait painter active in upstate New York, and father of trompe-l'oeil painter Richard La Barre Goodwin. An abolitionist, he was a stationmaster on the Underground Railroad and published the anti-slavery newspaper The Tocsin of Liberty.

== Personal life ==
Goodwin was born in Ovid, New York, in October 1800. He was largely self-educated and twice married, first to Almira Ives, who was born January 1, 1801, and died around 1837. They had five children. His second marriage was to Almira LaBarre (born October 29, 1817) in May 1839 at South Lansing, New York. They had three children. He lived in Dryden, Ludlowville, Auburn, and Albany, New York. His son, Richard La Barre Goodwin, was a landscape, still-life, and portrait painter.

== Career ==
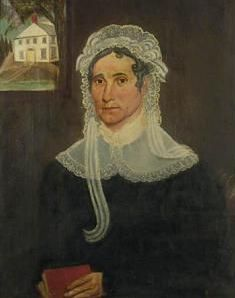
Rachel Smith by Edwin Weyburn Goodwin

Goodwin began his career as a merchant, but at age 29 took up painting portraits, including miniature portraits. He studied in New York City under Anthony Lewis De Rose; his first exhibit was at the National Academy of Design in 1836.

Goodwin painted some 800 portraits during his career. His subjects included anti-slavery activists President Martin Van Buren, William H. Seward (given to the city of Albany), DeWitt Clinton, James G. Birney, and Gerrit Smith of Albany.

Goodwin moved to Albany in 1835, where he operated an Underground Railroad station. Passengers came to his house from Rev. Abel Brown's house in Sand Lake, New York, and Rev. Charles Turner Torrey of Salem, Massachusetts. The freedom seekers were taken from his house to Canada across Lake Ontario.

He was an ardent abolitionist and abstinence advocate, taking ownership of The Tocsin of Liberty, an anti-slavery newspaper in Albany, around 1843 or 1844. He produced sketches for the Albany Patriot and the Tocsin of Liberty, both abolitionist newspapers. Goodwin lectured in New York state for emancipation and for total abstinence temperance. His 1837 lecture "Don't Bring it into the Church," caused him to be disciplined by his Methodist Episcopal Church of Auburn, New York.

He died in 1845 in Ithaca, New York, and was interred at Asbury Cemetery in Lansing, New York.

His work is collected in the Genesee Country Village and Museum. His papers are archived in the Smithsonian Institution.
