= Alfred Frankenstein =

American music and art critic (1906–1981)

Alfred Victor Frankenstein (October 5, 1906 – June 22, 1981) was an American music and art critic.

== Life and career ==
Alfred Victor Frankenstein was born in Chicago, Illinois on October 5, 1906; he attended the University of Chicago.

He was the long-time art and music critic for the San Francisco Chronicle from 1934 to 1965. He was noted for championing American art and coining the term Actual Art. His most famous book is After The Hunt, a volume that examined the trompe-l'œil movement in late 19th-century and early 20th-century American art, focussing especially on the painters William Harnett and John Frederick Peto. Among his colleagues, he was noted for his wit and his lack of tolerance for pretension.

Prior to becoming a journalist and critic, he played clarinet in the Chicago Symphony Orchestra. He was married to the concert violinist Sylvia Lent.

He was also a professor of Art History at the University of California at Berkeley in the 1970s and a professor of Art History at Mills College in Oakland in the 1960s and 1970s. Frankenstein died on June 22, 1981, in San Francisco.

Frankenstein was a cousin of Abraham F. Frankenstein, who composed the music of California's official state song, "I Love You, California".

== Books ==
- After the Hunt; William Harnett and Other American Still Life Painters, 1870-1900. Berkeley: University of California Press, 1953.
- A Modern Guide to Symphonic Music. New York: Meredith Press. 1966.
- After the Hunt; William Harnett and Other American Still Life Painters, 1870-1900. Rev. ed. Berkeley, University of California Press, 1969.
- The Reality of Appearance: The Trompe l'œil Tradition in American Painting. Greenwich, Conn: New York Graphic Society Ltd. 1970.
- The World of Copley, 1738-1815. New York: Time-Life Books. 1970.
- Karel Appel. New York: H.N. Abrams. 1980. ISBN 0-8109-0364-4
- Painter of Rural America: William Sidney Mount, 1807-1868. Washington: H.K. Press, c1968.

== Sources ==
- Author and Bookinfo.com
