= Richard La Barre Goodwin =

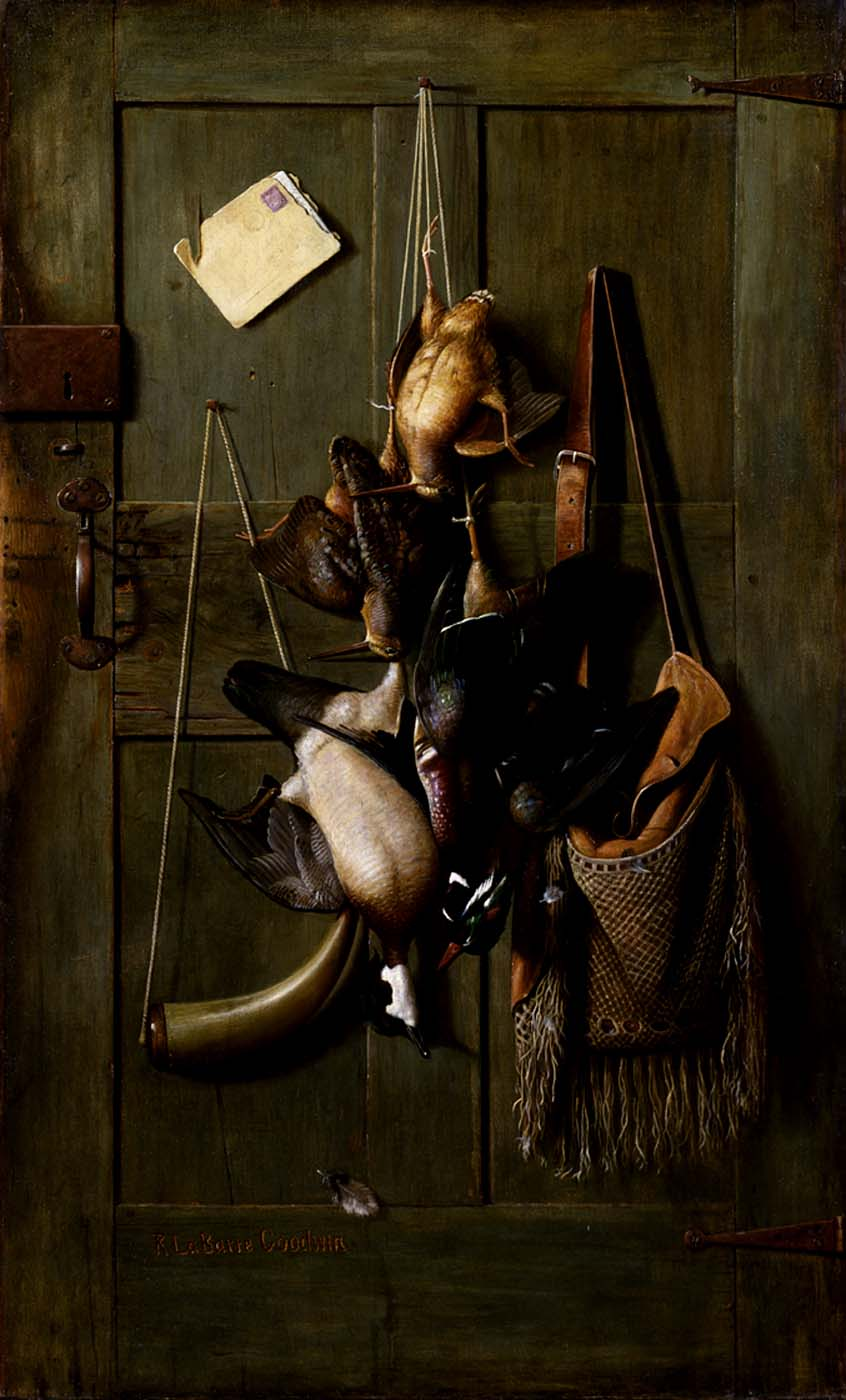
Cabin Door Still Life by Richard La Barre Goodwin

Richard La Barre Goodwin (March 26, 1840 – December 10, 1910), also known as LaBarre Goodwin, was an American trompe-l'œil painter best known for his depictions of cabin doors, but also active in portraits and still lives of fruit, flowers, and kitchen scenes.

Goodwin was born in Albany, New York as the son of portrait painter Edwin Weyburn Goodwin (1800–45), and apparently studied painting in New York City. He served in the Union Army during the American Civil War, but was wounded in the First Battle of Bull Run and discharged in 1862. He then became an itinerant portrait artist in western New York State before taking up still life in the mid-1880s while living in Syracuse. His earliest known game paintings date to 1889, seemingly inspired by William Harnett's After the Hunt. From 1890-1893 he lived in Washington, D.C., where he sold a number of cabin-door paintings to members of the California delegation, notably Senator Leland Stanford. After visiting the World's Columbian Exposition of 1893 he settled in Chicago for seven years, then moved to Colorado Springs (1900-1902) and subsequently Los Angeles and San Francisco, where many of his works were destroyed in the fires after the 1906 earthquake. After intervals in Portland, Oregon, (1906–08) and Rochester, New York, (1908-10) he settled in Orange, New Jersey, when he died at the age of seventy in 1910.

Goodwin's paintings are collected in the Smithsonian American Art Museum, Addison Gallery of American Art, Gilcrease Museum, Hunter Museum of American Art, Memorial Art Gallery of the University of Rochester, the John L. Wehle Gallery of Genesee Country Village & Museum, and Terra Foundation for American Art.
