= Florence Prusmack =

Florence Prusmack (April 21, 1920 – December 24, 2013) was an American author of articles, monographs, and books focusing on Japan and East Asia.

She married Armand Prusmack; they had a son, Tim Prusmack (died 2004), who was a numismatist.

Thomas M. Disch considers her an example of a "great bad novelist," like William McGonagall.

== Works ==
- Masako, Lady Shogun PublishAmerica, 2004, ISBN 978-1-4137-1591-0
- Khan Ashby-Ferguson, 1992, ISBN 978-0-9633903-0-1
- Aloha Eden Ashby-Ferguson, 1982
- The Jade God
