= William Harnett =

American painter

- Born: August 10, 1848; Clonakilty, County Cork, Ireland
- Died: October 29, 1892 (aged 44); New York City, US
- Occupation: painter
- Known for: still life
- Style: trompe-l'œil

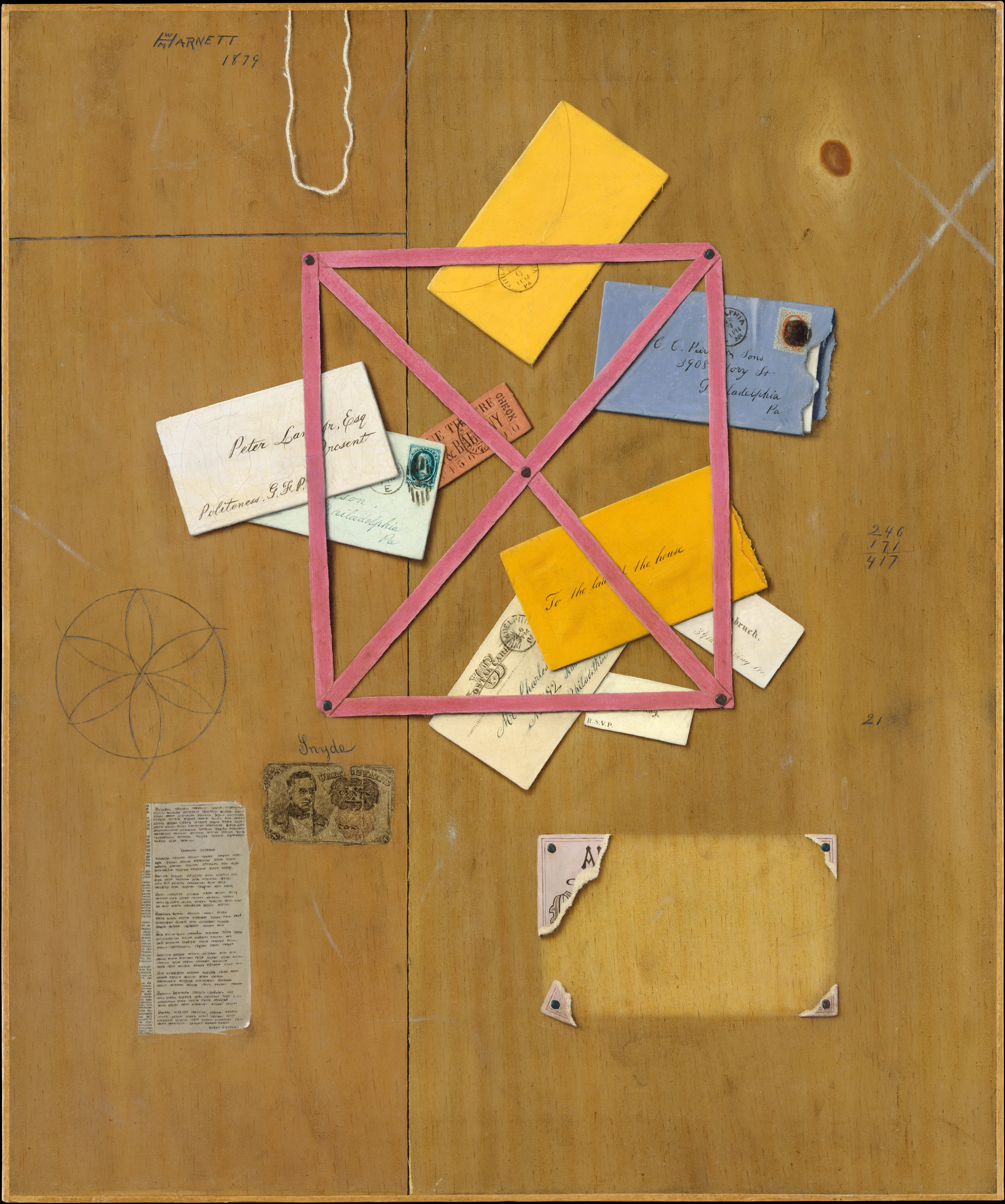
The Artist's Letter Rack, Metropolitan Museum of Art, 1879

William Michael Harnett (August 10, 1848 – October 29, 1892) was an American painter known for his trompe-l'œil still lifes of ordinary objects.

== Early life ==
Harnett was born in Clonakilty, County Cork, Ireland, during the time of the Great Famine. His father was a shoemaker. Shortly after Harnett's birth his family emigrated to America, settling in Philadelphia. He was naturalized as a United States citizen in 1868. He learned engraving at the age of seventeen, and between 1865 and 1875 he made a living first in Philadelphia and then in New York City by engraving designs on table silver for firms such as Tiffany and Company. During this period he also took night classes at the Pennsylvania Academy of the Fine Arts and later, in New York, at Cooper Union and at the National Academy of Design. His first known oil paintings date from 1874; among them are studies of plaster casts of Minerva and Cupid and his first known finished still-life painting, Paint Tube and Grapes.

== Work ==
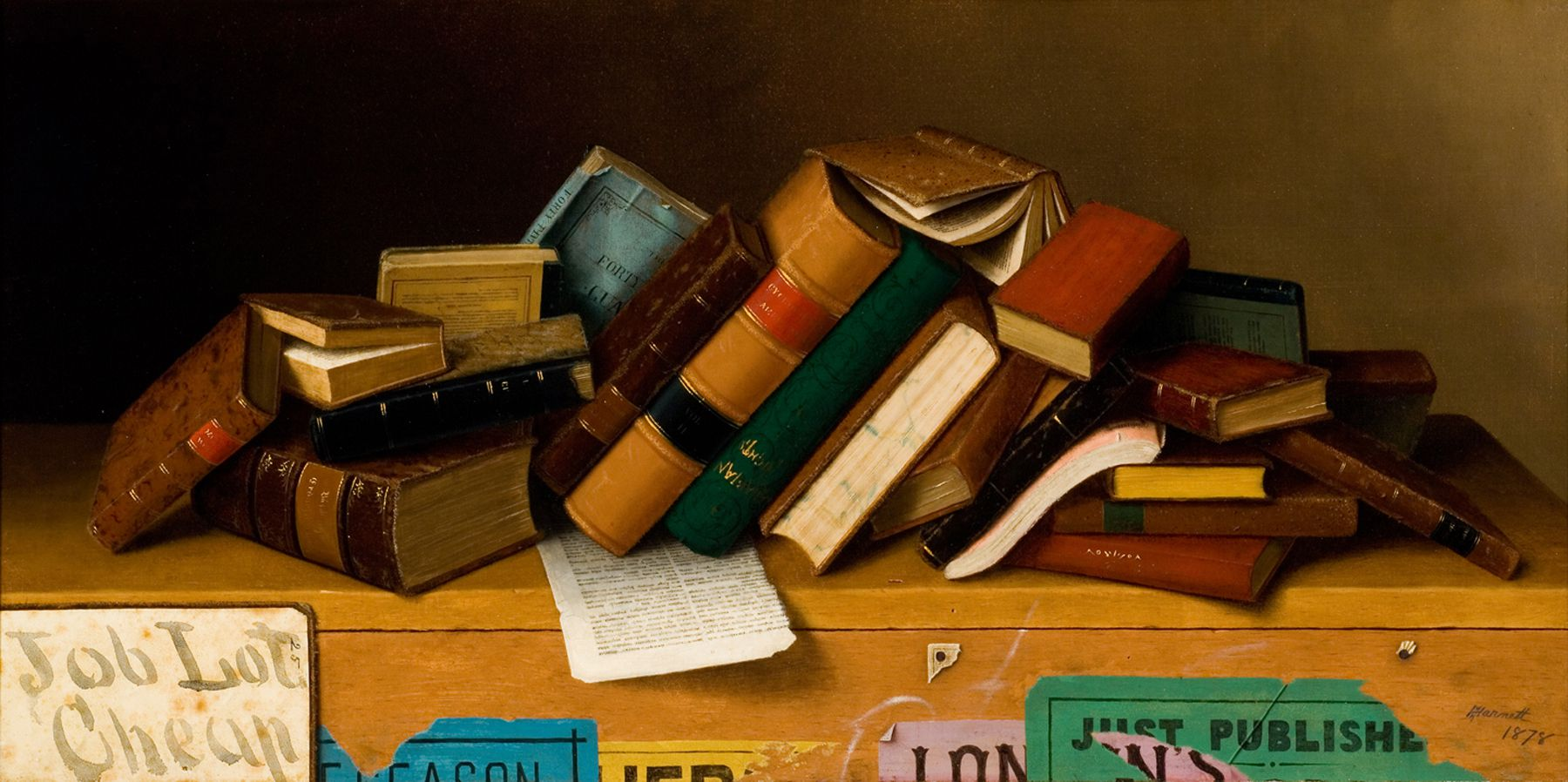
Job Lot Cheap, oil on canvas, 1878. Reynolda House Museum of American Art

The style of trompe-l'œil painting that Harnett developed was distinctive and inspired many imitators, but it was not without precedent. A number of 17th-century Dutch painters, Pieter Claesz for instance, had specialized in tabletop still life of astonishing verisimilitude. Raphaelle Peale, working in Philadelphia in the early 19th century, pioneered the form in America. What sets Harnett's work apart, besides his enormous skill, is his interest in depicting objects not usually made the subject of a painting. Harnett painted musical instruments, hanging game, and tankards, but also painted the unconventional Golden Horseshoe (1886), a single rusted horseshoe shown nailed to a board. He painted a casual jumble of second-hand books set on top of a crate, Job Lot, Cheap (1878), as well as firearms and paper currency.

Although his works sold well to a clientele of merchants and industrialists, and were on display in many business offices, department stores, and taverns, they did not conform to contemporary notions of high art. On the rare occasions when they were included in exhibitions in museums or at the National Academy of Design they were criticized as mere novelties.

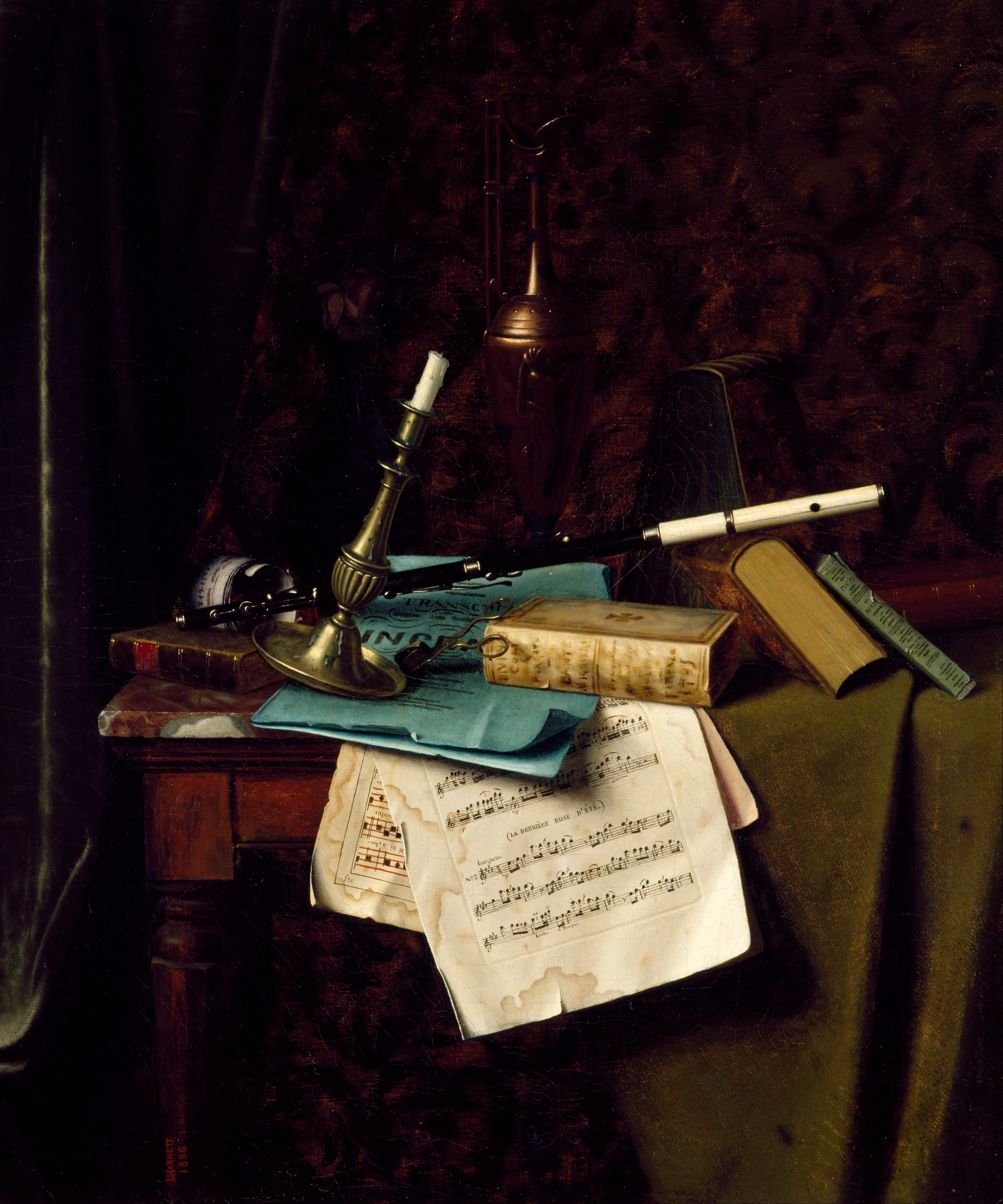
William Michael Harnett – The Last Summer Rose

Harnett spent the years 1880–1886 in Europe, staying in Munich from 1881 until early 1885. Harnett's best-known paintings, the four versions of After The Hunt, were painted between 1883 and 1885. Each is an imposing composition of hunting equipment and dead game, hanging on a door with ornate hinges at the right and keyhole plate at the left. These paintings, like the horseshoe or currency depictions mentioned earlier, are especially effective as trompe-l'œil because the objects occupy a shallow space, meaning that the illusion is not spoiled by parallax shift if the viewer moves.

Overall, Harnett's work is most comparable to that of the slightly younger John F. Peto. The two artists knew each other, and a comparison can be made between two paintings featuring violins. Harnett's Music and Good Luck from 1888 shows the violin hanging upright on a door with ornate hinges and with a slightly torn piece of sheet music behind it. The elements are arranged in a stable, deliberate manner. Peto's 1890 painting shows the violin hanging askew, as well as chipped and worn, with one string broken. The sheet music is dog-eared and torn around the edges, and placed haphazardly behind the instrument. The hinges are less ornate, and one is broken. Harnett's objects show signs of use but are well preserved, while Peto's more humble objects are nearly used up.

When the catalogs of Harnett and Peto were posthumously analyzed, it was determined that "many of [Peto's] canvases received forged signatures of William Harnett."

== Later years and death ==
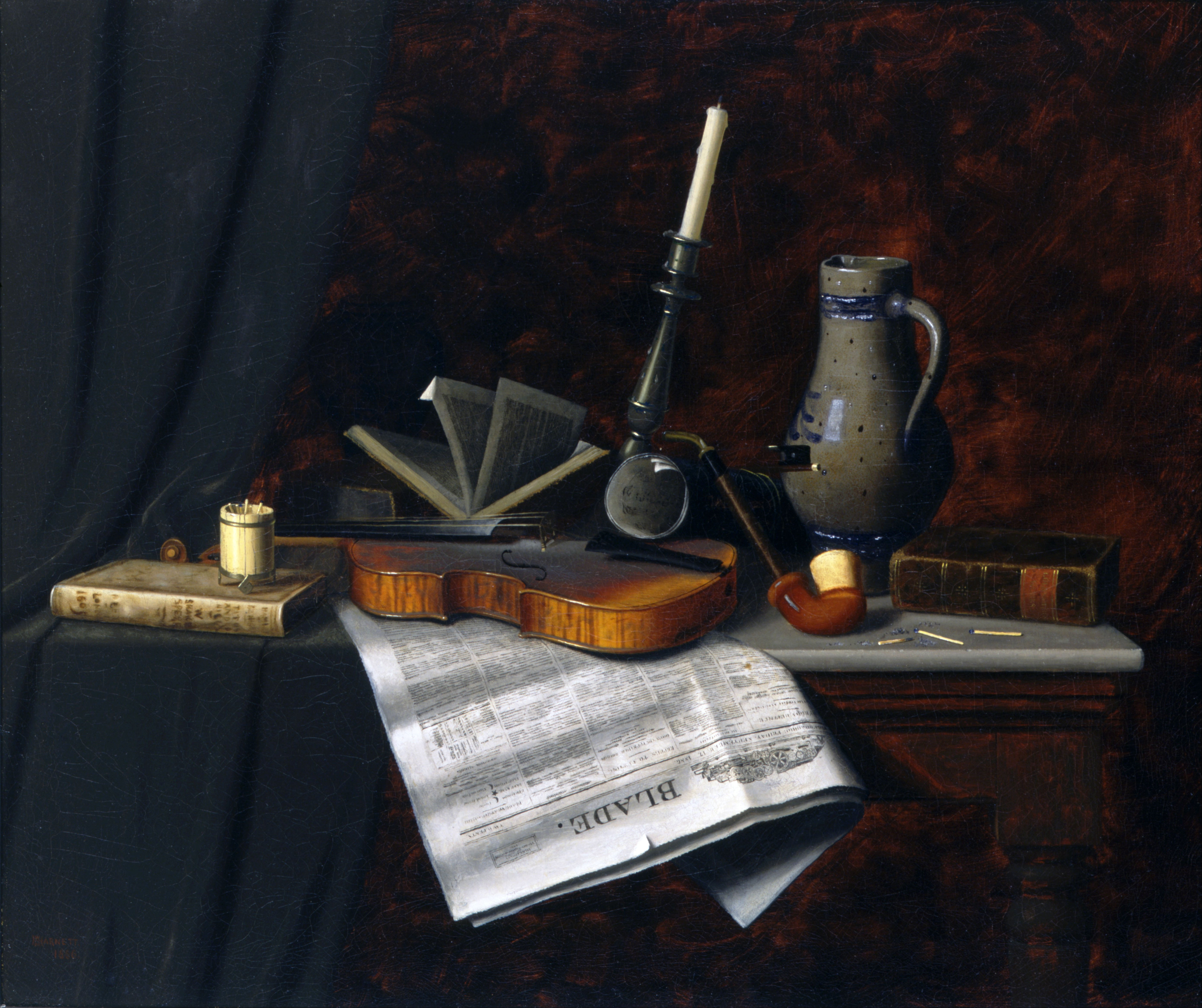
William Michael Harnett - Still Life with the Toledo Blade

Crippling rheumatism plagued Harnett in his last years, reducing the number but not the quality of his paintings. He died in New York City in 1892 and was interred at the Old Cathedral Cemetery in Philadelphia, Pennsylvania. Other artists who painted similar compositions in Harnett's wake include his contemporary John Haberle and successors such as Otis Kaye, Jefferson David Chalfant, and Richard La Barre Goodwin.

== Collections ==
Harnett's work is in collections in the Munson-Williams-Proctor Arts Institute (Utica, New York), Albright-Knox Art Gallery (Buffalo, New York), the Amon Carter Museum (Texas), the Dallas Museum of Art, the Art Institute of Chicago, the Brooklyn Museum of Art, the Carnegie Museum of Art (Pittsburgh), the Cincinnati Art Museum, the Cleveland Museum of Art, the Detroit Institute of Arts, the Fine Arts Museums of San Francisco, Harvard University Art Museums, the High Museum of Art (Atlanta, Georgia), the Honolulu Museum of Art, the Joslyn Art Museum (Nebraska), the Los Angeles County Museum of Art, the Metropolitan Museum of Art, the National Gallery of Art (Washington D.C.), the National Gallery of Canada (Ottawa), the Philadelphia Museum of Art, the San Diego Museum of Art (California), Thyssen-Bornemisza Museum (Madrid), the Toledo Museum of Art (Ohio), the Wadsworth Atheneum (Connecticut), and the Wichita Art Museum among others.

== Gallery ==
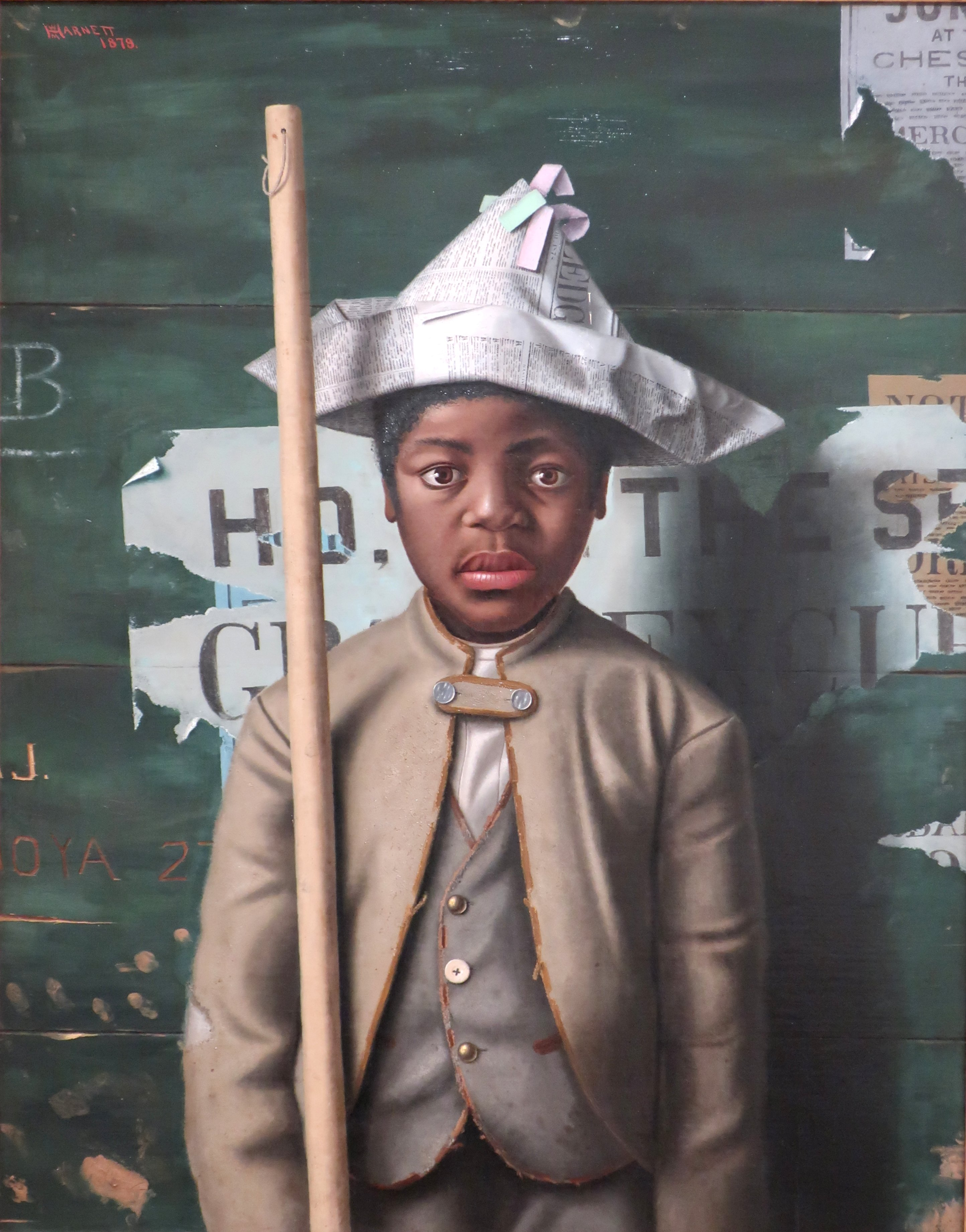
Attention, Company!, 1878, Amon Carter Museum, Fort Worth

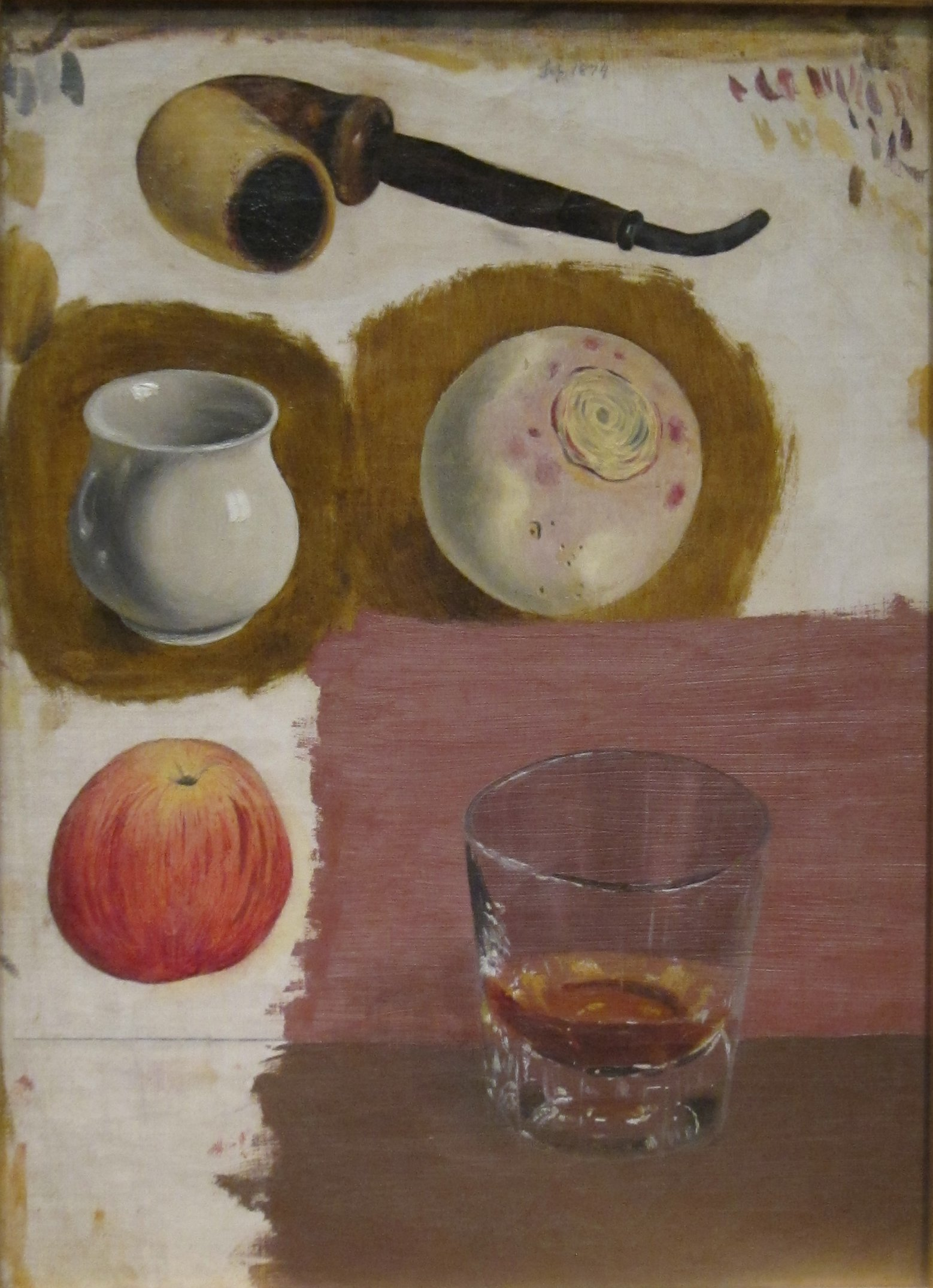
Study of a Pipe and Other Objects, De Young Museum, 1874

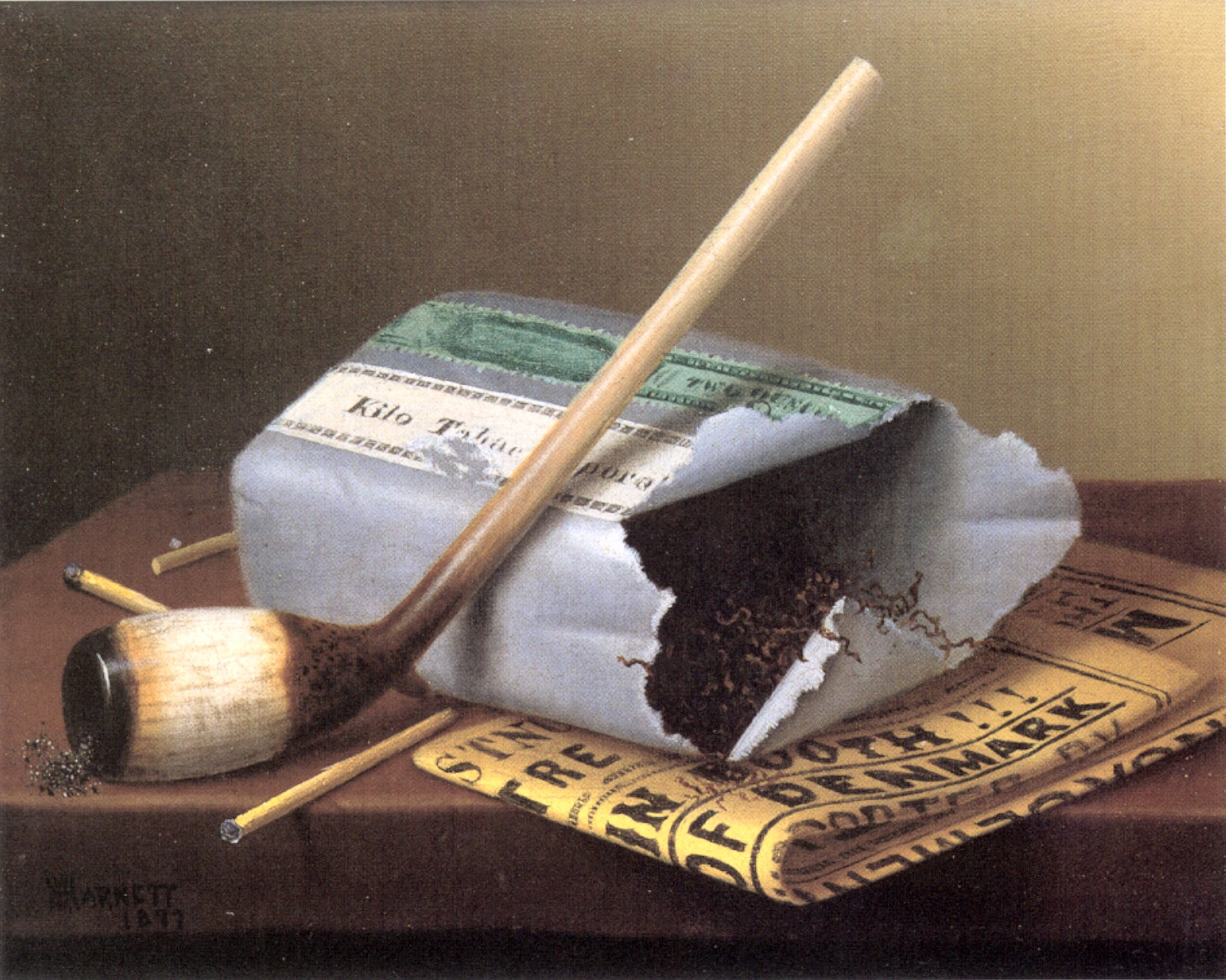
A Smoke Backstage, by William Michael Harnett, oil on canvas, 1877, Honolulu Museum of Art

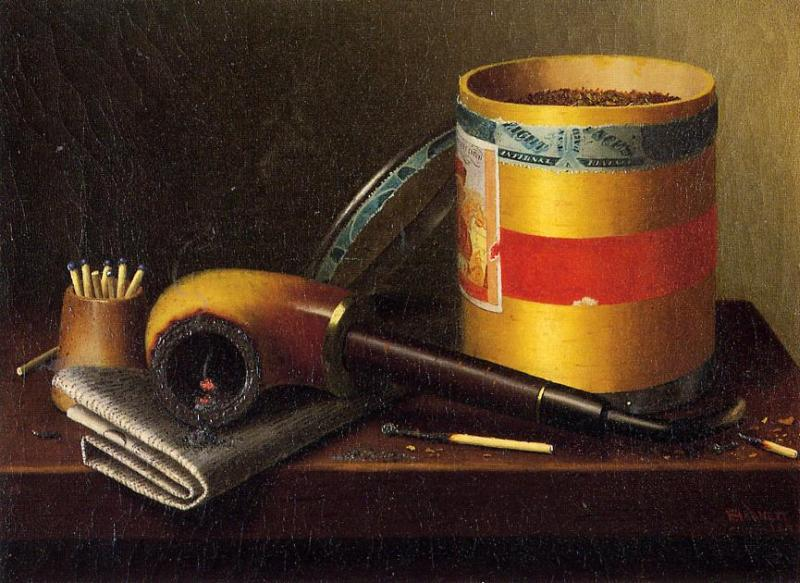
Still Life, Chrysler Museum of Art, 1877

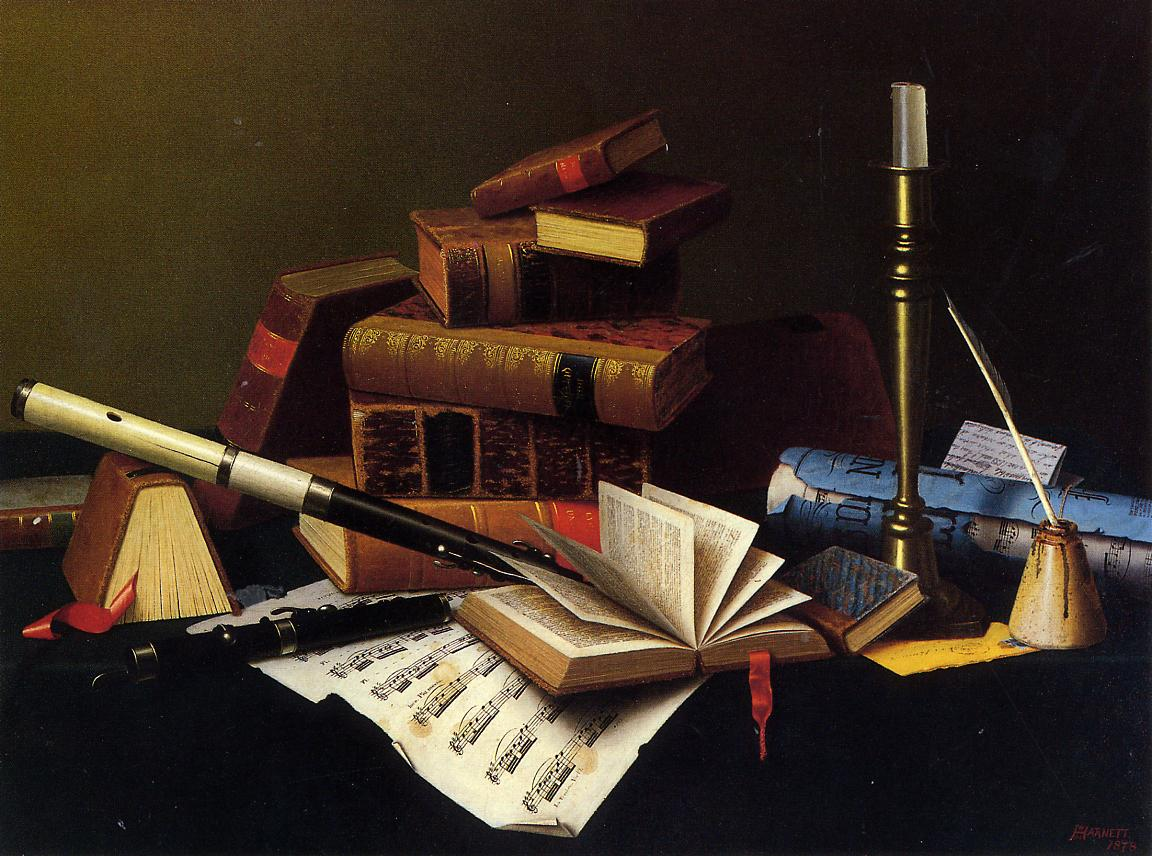
Music and Literature, Buffalo AKG Art Museum, 1878

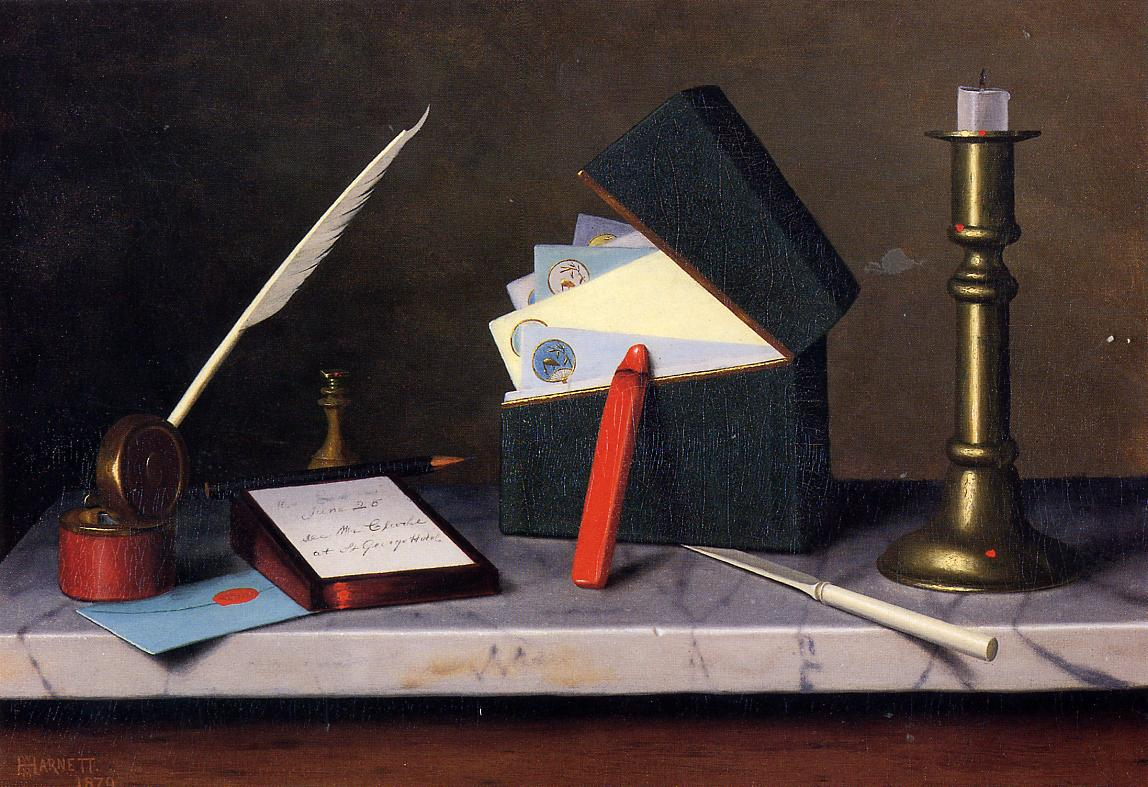
Secretary's Table, 1879

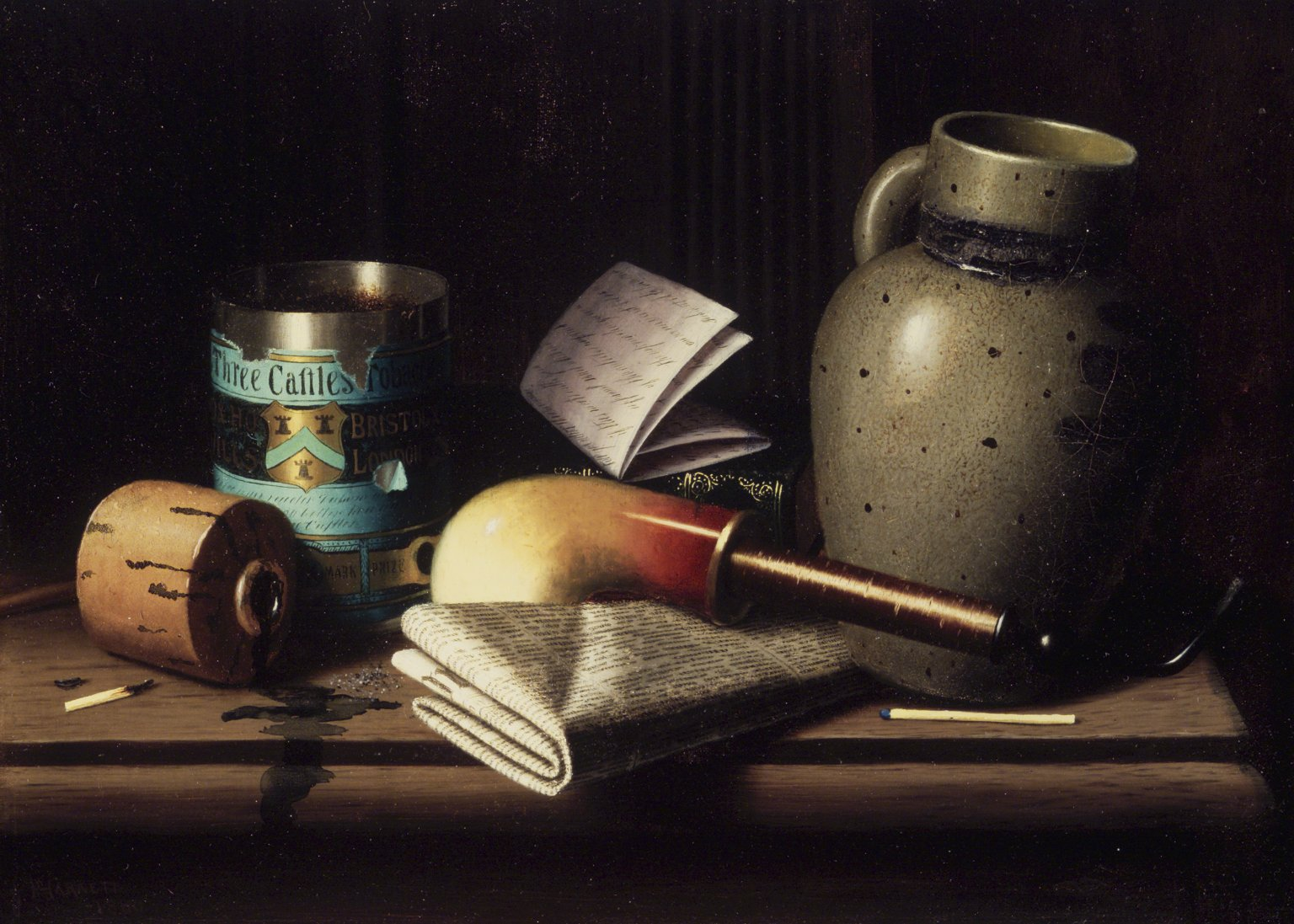
Still Life with Three Castles Tobacco, 1880, Brooklyn Museum

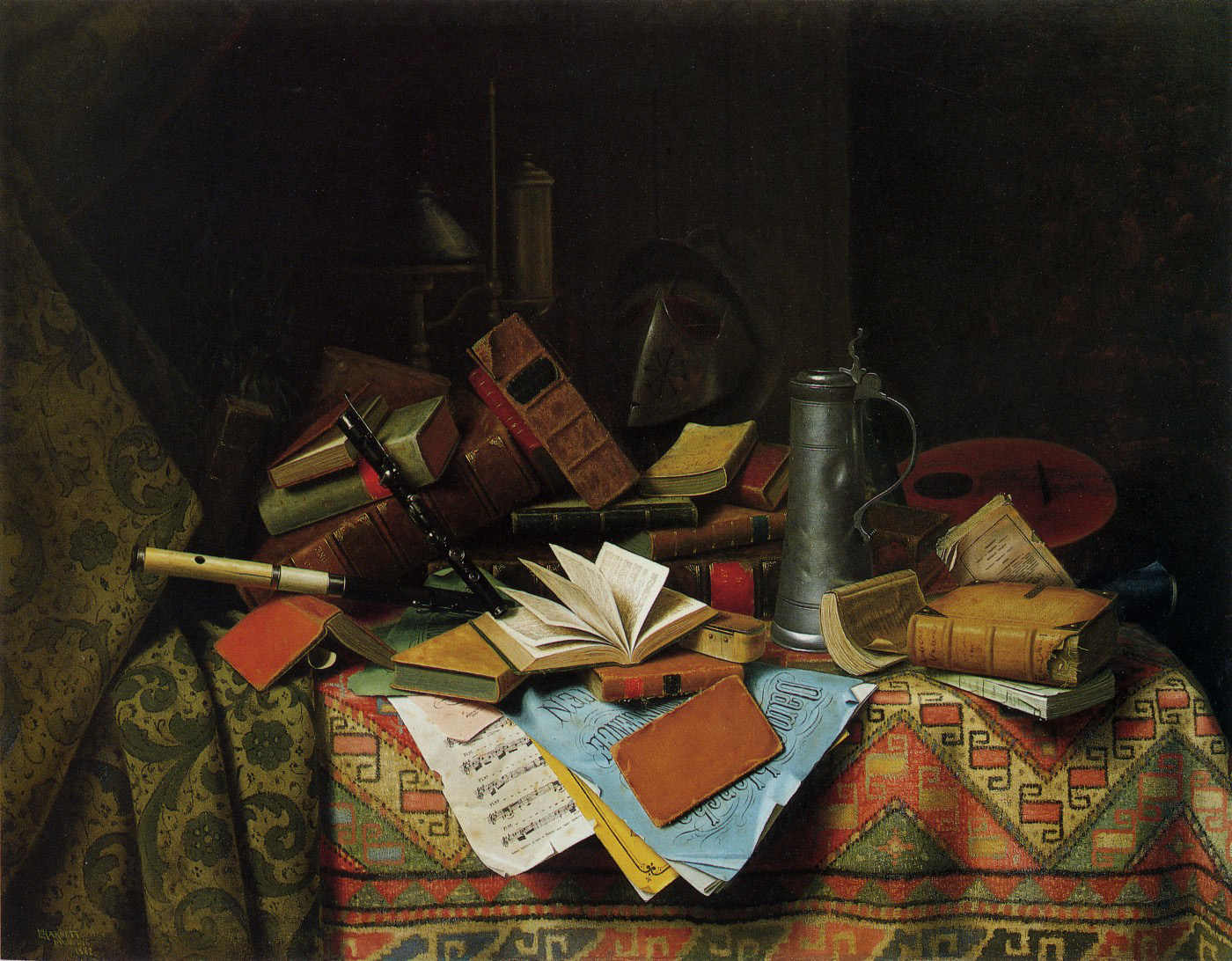
A Study Table, 1882

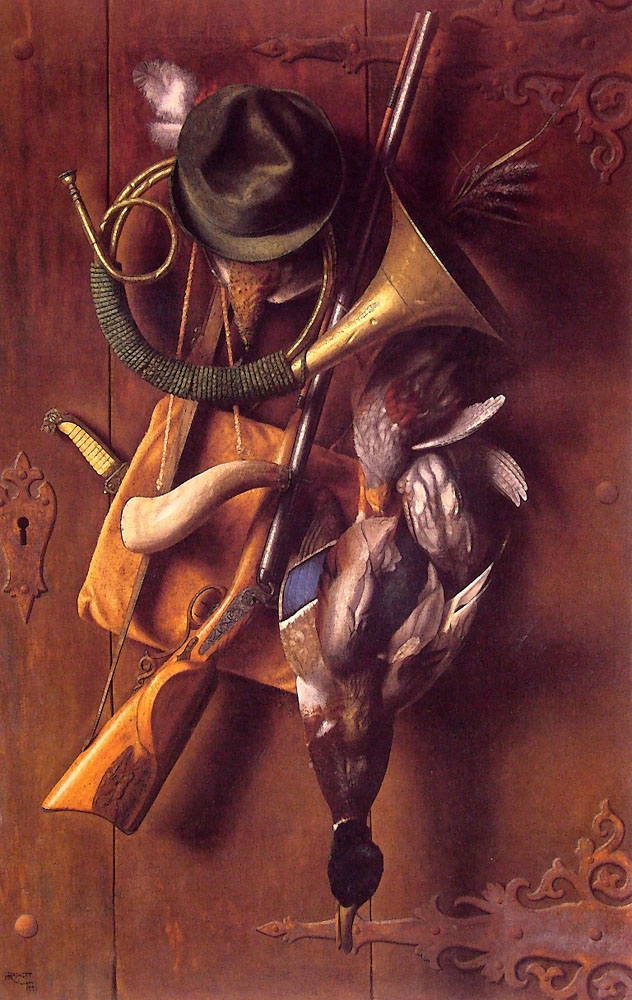
After the Hunt, 1883, Huntington Library, San Marino, CA

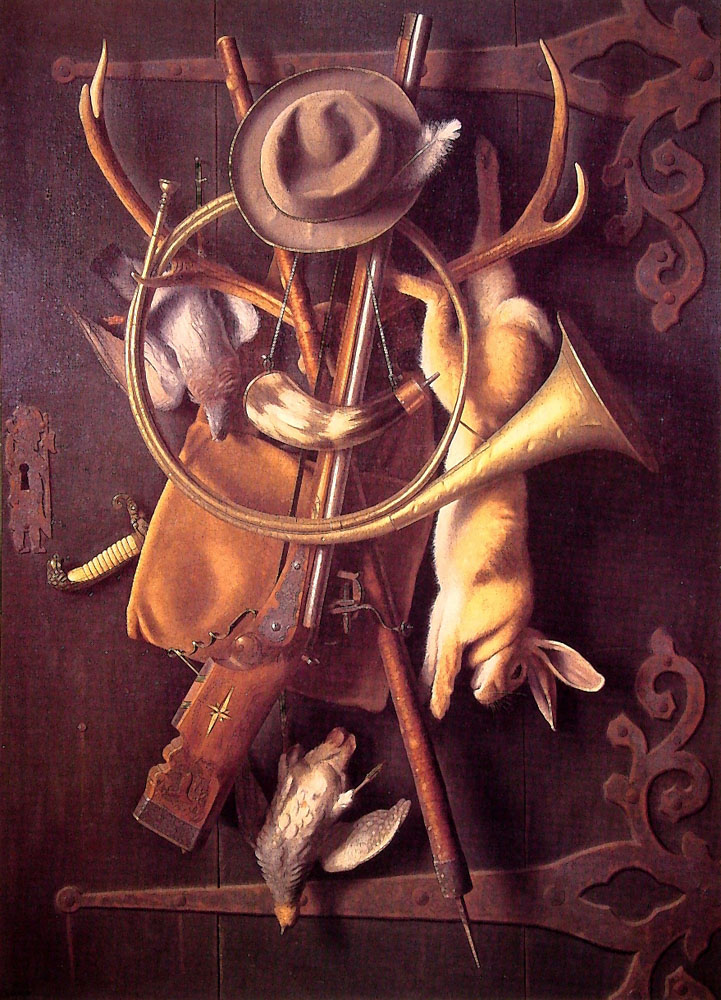
After the Hunt, 1884, Butler Institute of American Art, Youngstown, Ohio

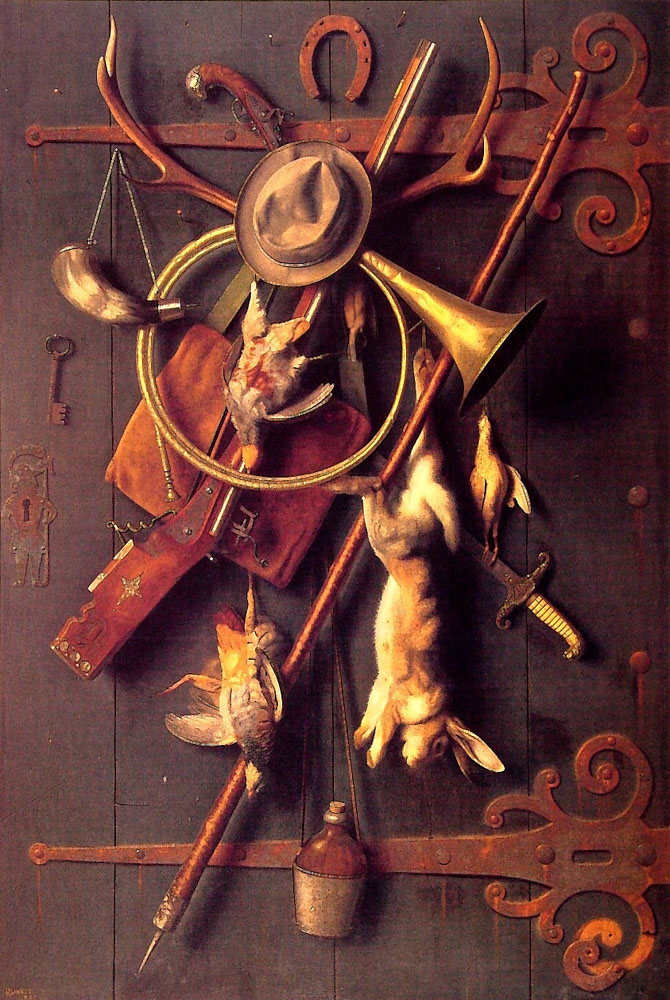
After the Hunt, 1885, California Palace of the Legion of Honor, San Francisco

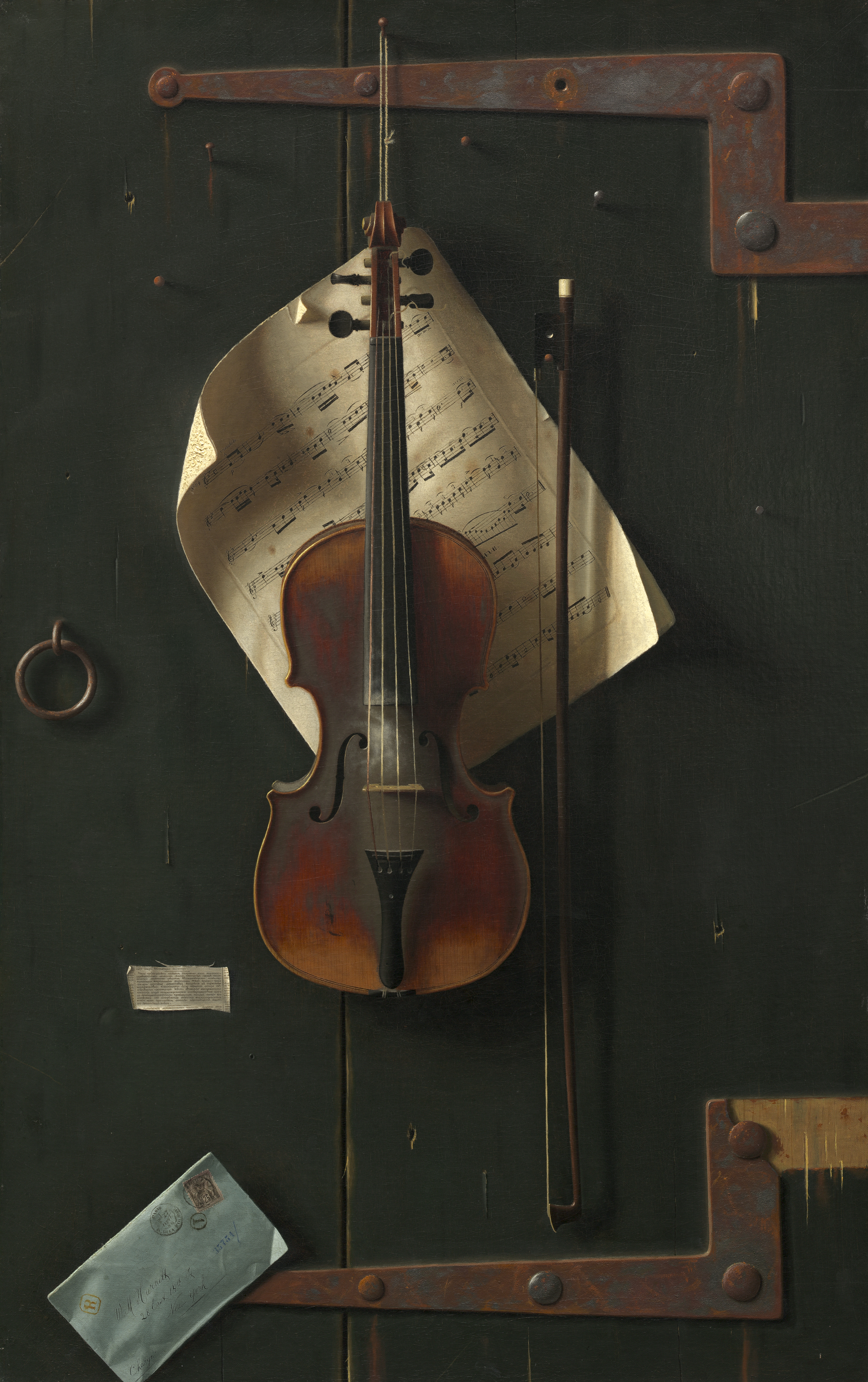
The Old Violin, 1886, National Gallery of Art, Washington, DC.

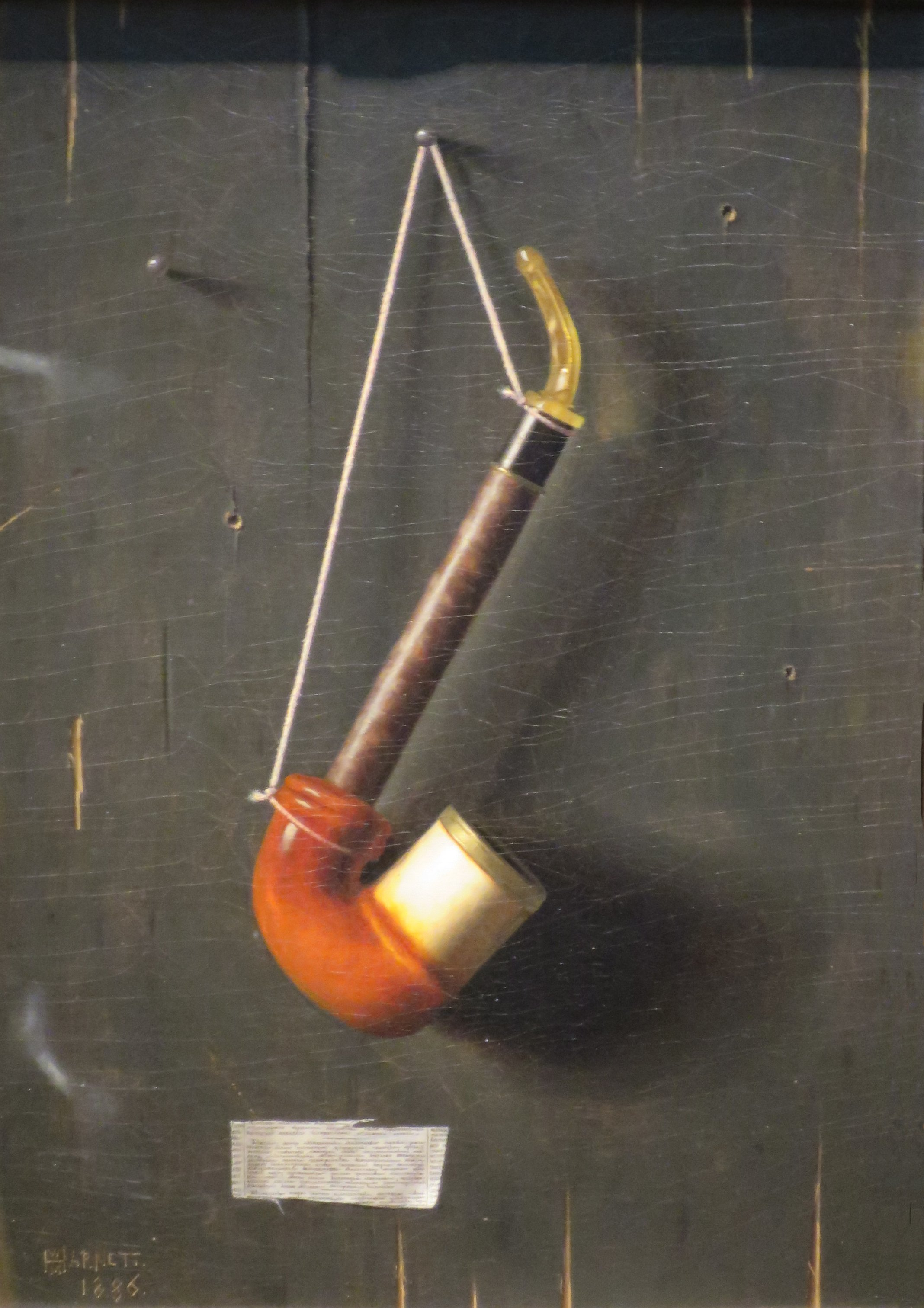
The Meerschaum Pipe, De Young Museum, 1886

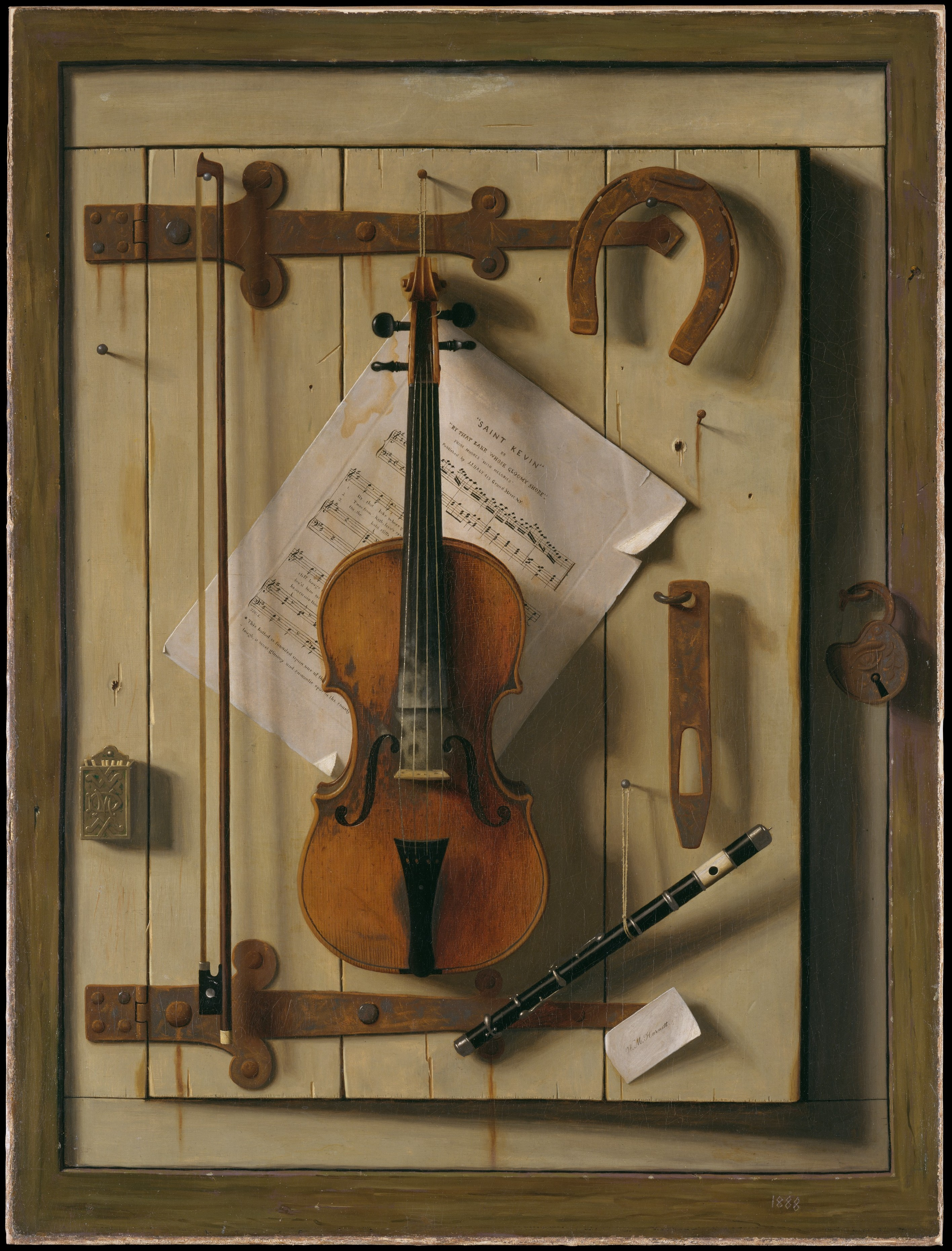
Music and Good Luck, 1888, Metropolitan Museum of Art

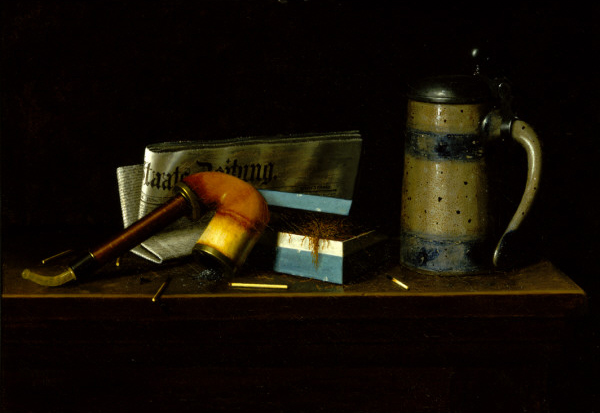
With the "Staats Zeitung'', 1890

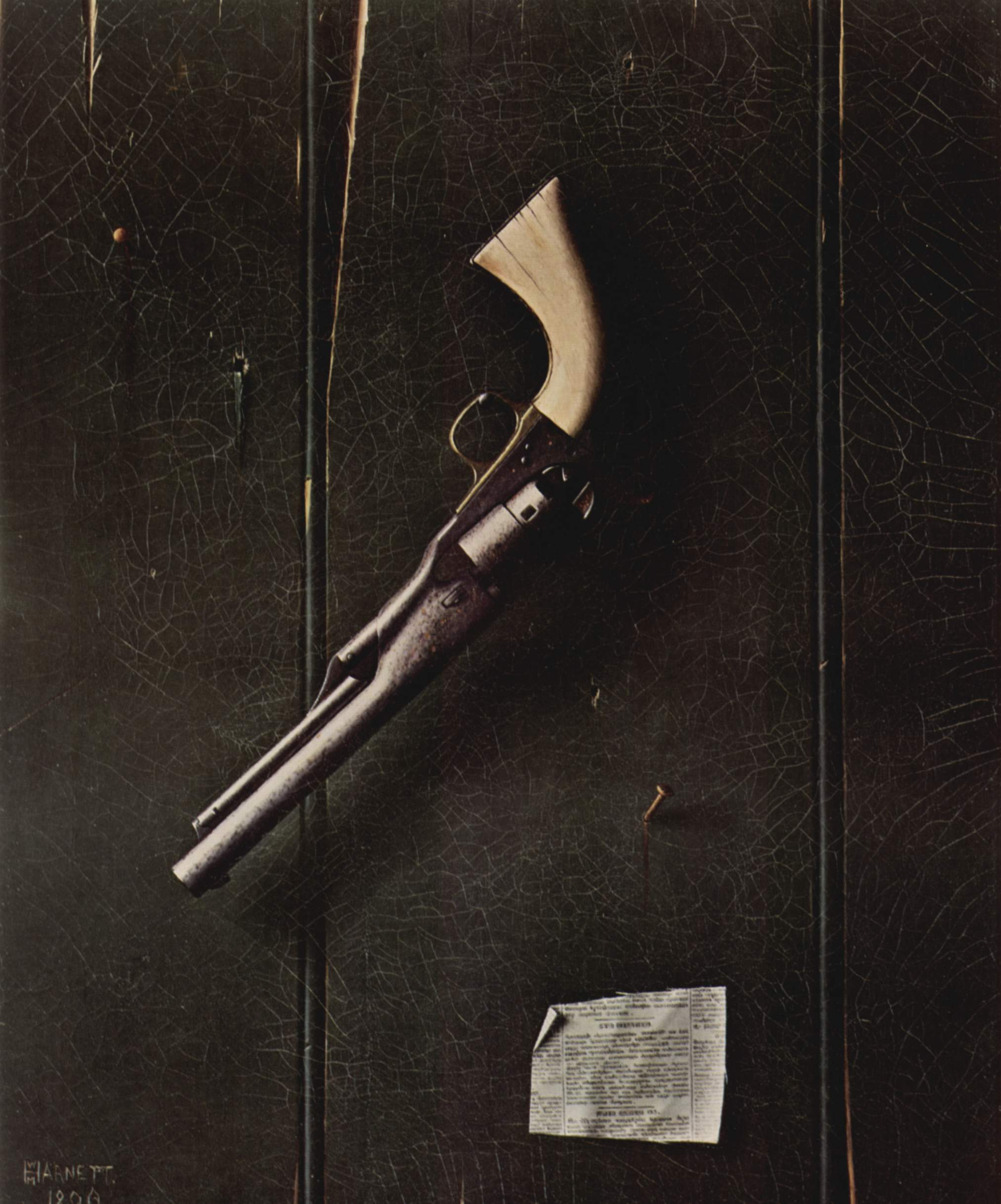
The Faithful Colt, Wadsworth Atheneum, Hartford, Connecticut, 1890

== Legacy ==
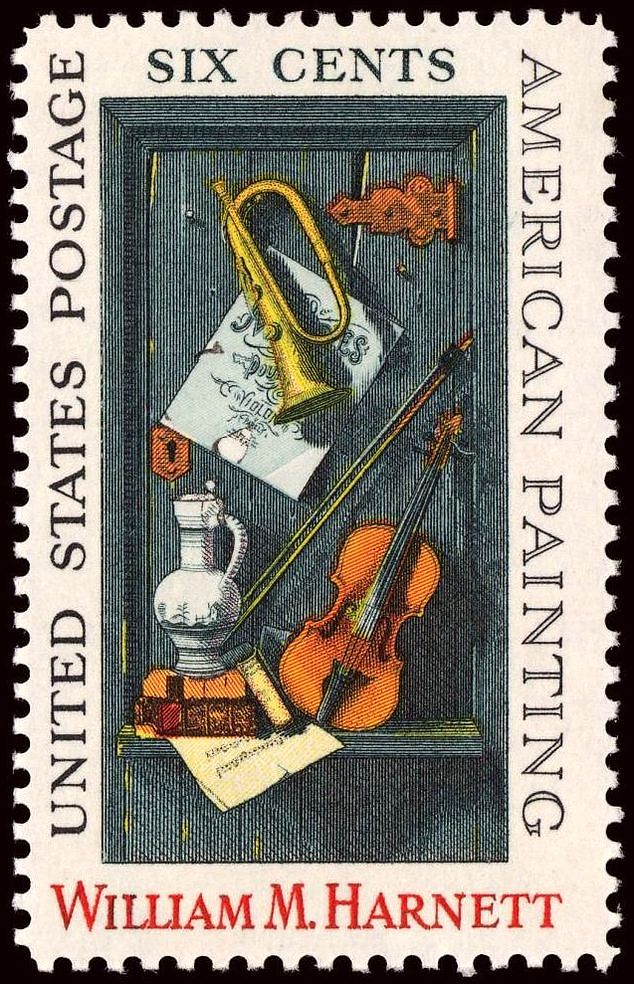
William Harnett commemorative stamp, issue of 1969

William M. Harnett was honored with a U.S. commemorative stamp in 1969, first placed on sale at Boston, Massachusetts, on December 3, 1969. The painting featured in the stamp is Old Models, which is held in the collection of the Boston Museum of Fine Arts.
