= John F. Peto =

American painter

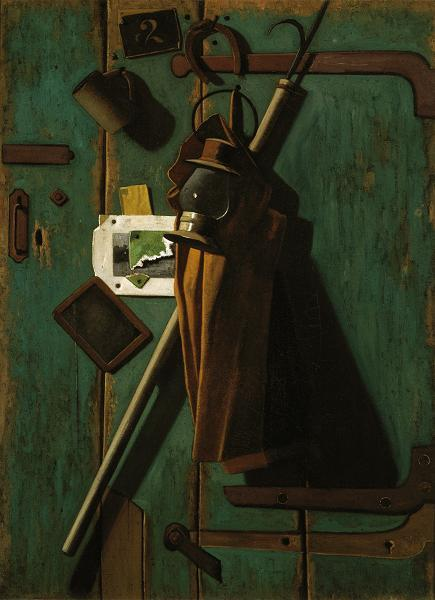
- Fish House Door, 1905, Dallas Museum of Art
- Born: May 21, 1854; Philadelphia, Pennsylvania
- Died: November 23, 1907 (aged 53); Island Heights, New Jersey
- Education: Pennsylvania Academy of the Fine Arts
- Known for: Painting

John Frederick Peto (May 21, 1854 – November 23, 1907) was an American trompe-l'œil ("fool the eye") painter who was long forgotten until his paintings were rediscovered along with those of fellow trompe-l'œil artist William Harnett.

== Career ==
Although Peto and the slightly older Harnett knew each other and painted similar subjects, their careers followed different paths. Peto was born in Philadelphia, Pennsylvania, and studied at the Pennsylvania Academy of the Fine Arts at the same time as Harnett. Until he was in his mid-thirties, he submitted paintings regularly to the annual exhibitions at the Philadelphia Academy. In 1889, he moved to the resort town of Island Heights, New Jersey, where he worked in obscurity for the rest of his life. He and his wife took in seasonal boarders, he found work playing cornet at the town's camp revival meetings, and he supplemented his income by selling his paintings to tourists. He never had a gallery exhibition in his lifetime. Harnett, on the other hand, achieved success and had considerable influence on other artists painting in the trompe-l'œil genre, but even his paintings were given the snub by critics as mere novelty and trickery. Both artists were masters of trompe-l'œil, a genre of still life that aims to deceive the viewer into mistaking painted objects for reality. When the catalogs of the two artists were posthumously analyzed, it was determined that "many of [Peto's] canvases received forged signatures of William Harnett."

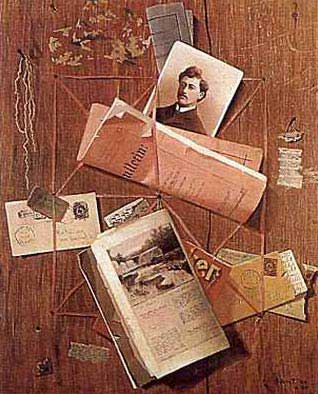
Letter Rack by Peto, 1907

Peto's paintings, generally considered less technically skilled than Harnett's, are more abstract, use more unusual color, and often have a stronger emotional resonance. Peto's mature works have an opaque and powdery texture which is often compared to Chardin.

The subject matter of Peto's paintings consisted of the most ordinary of things: pistols, horseshoes, bits of paper, keys, books, and the like. He frequently painted old time "letter racks", which were a kind of board that used ribbons tacked into a square that held notes, letters, pencils, and photographs. Many of Peto's paintings reinterpret themes Harnett had painted earlier, but Peto's compositions are less formal and his objects are typically rustier, more worn, less expensive looking.

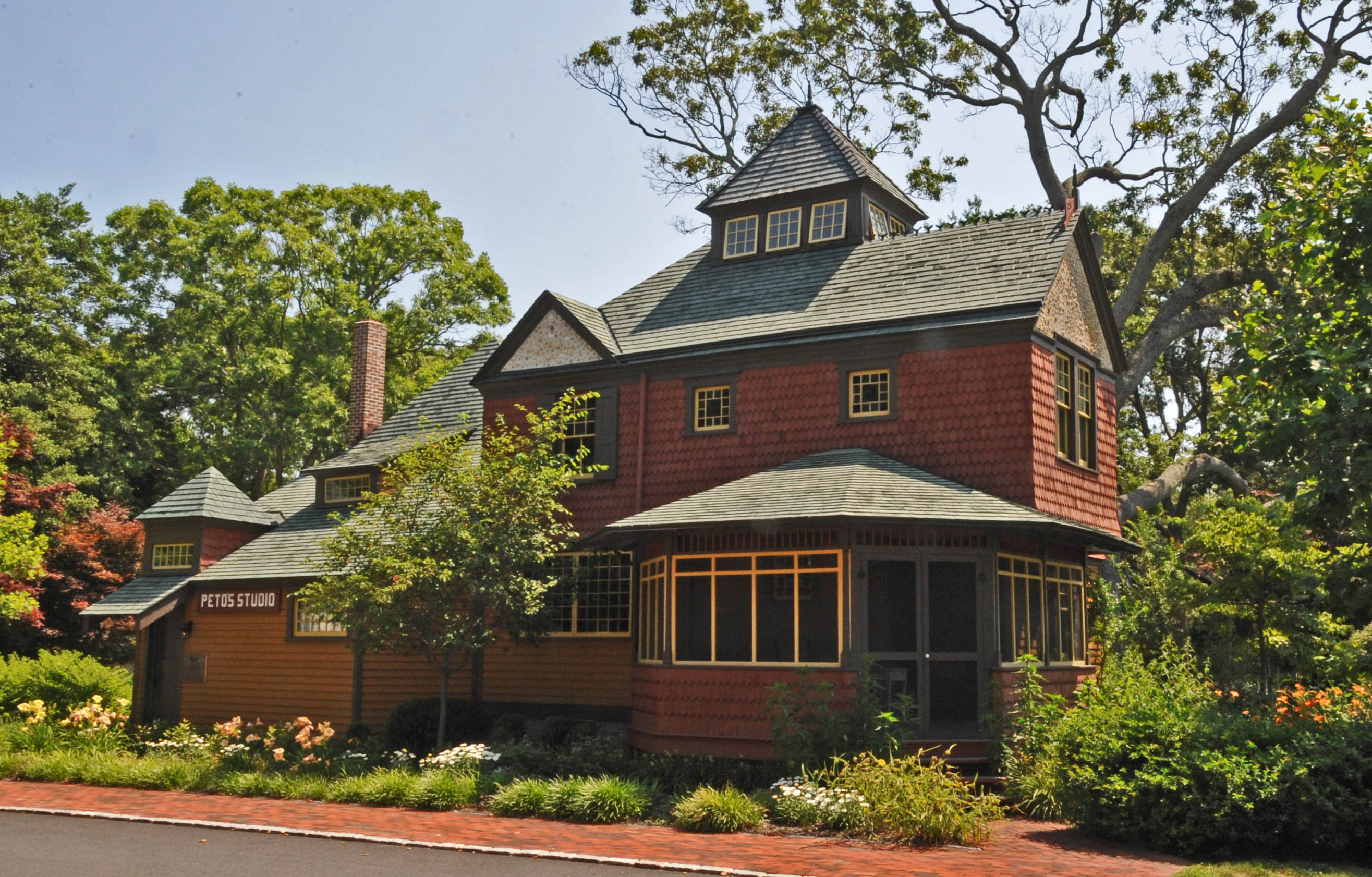
Peto Studio Museum

A pioneering study of Peto and Harnett is Alfred Frankenstein's After the Hunt: William Harnett and Other American Still Life Painters, 1870-1900.

== John F. Peto Studio Museum ==
The John F. Peto Studio Museum preserves the artist's house and studio in Island Heights, New Jersey. Built in 1889, the house was mostly designed by the artist and remained in his family for over 100 years. Opened in 2011, the house has been furnished to appear as during Peto's residency around the turn of the 20th century, and features reproductions of his paintings. Painter Abbey Ryan also teaches an annual professional painting workshop at the John F. Peto Studio Museum.

== Gallery ==
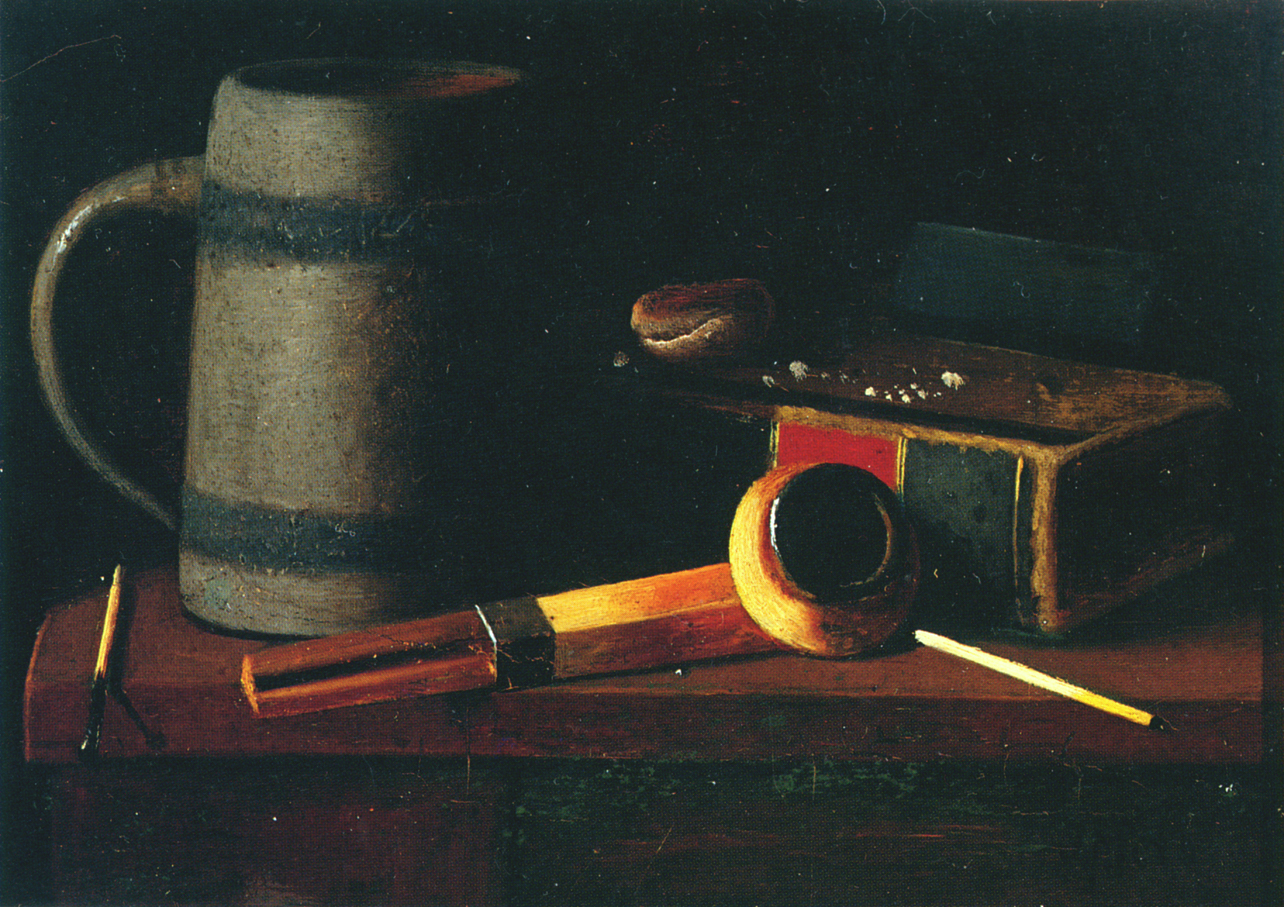
Still Life with Mug, Pipe and Book (1899)

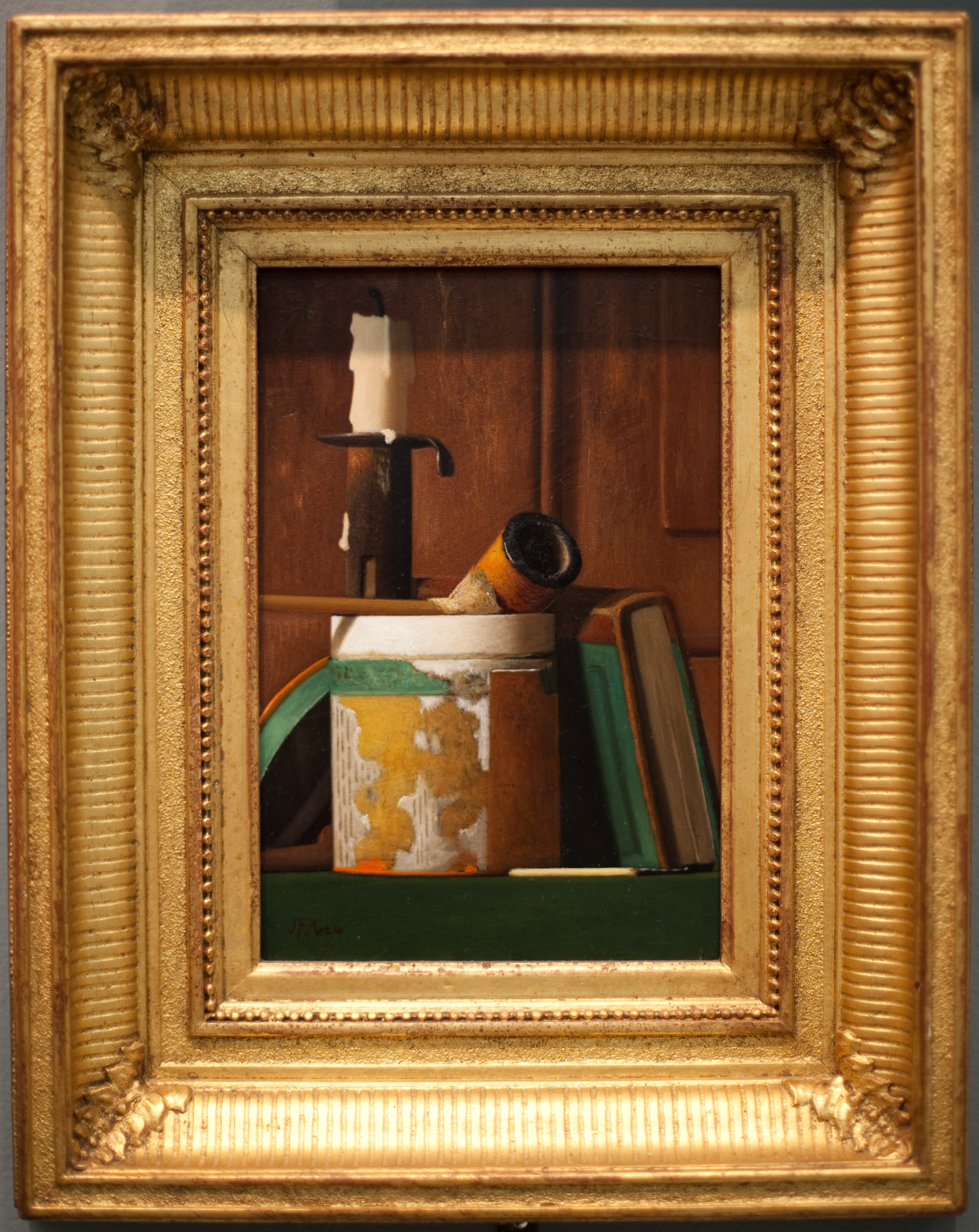
Candlestick, Pipe, and Tobacco Box (c. 1890)

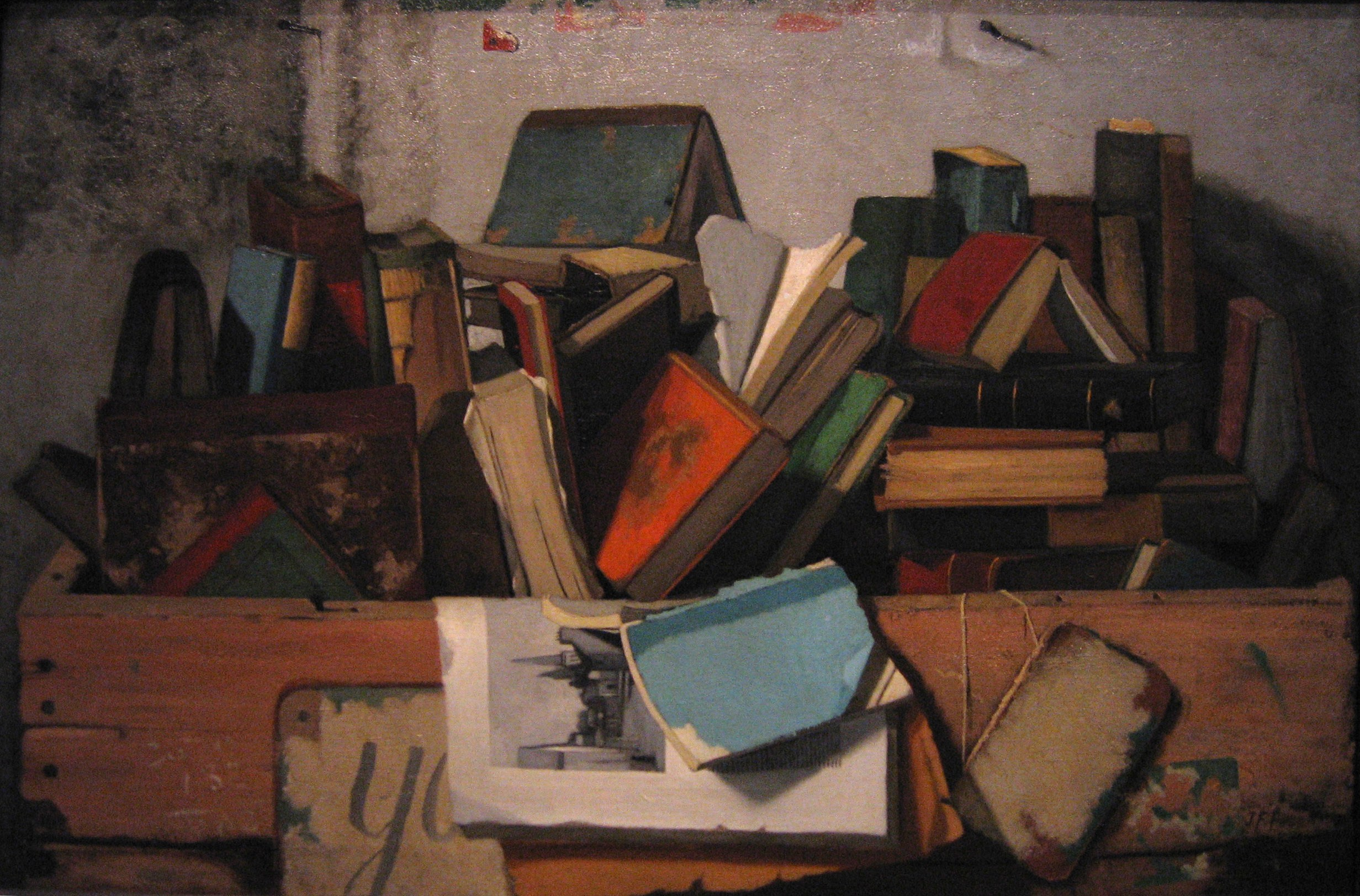
Take Your Choice (1885)

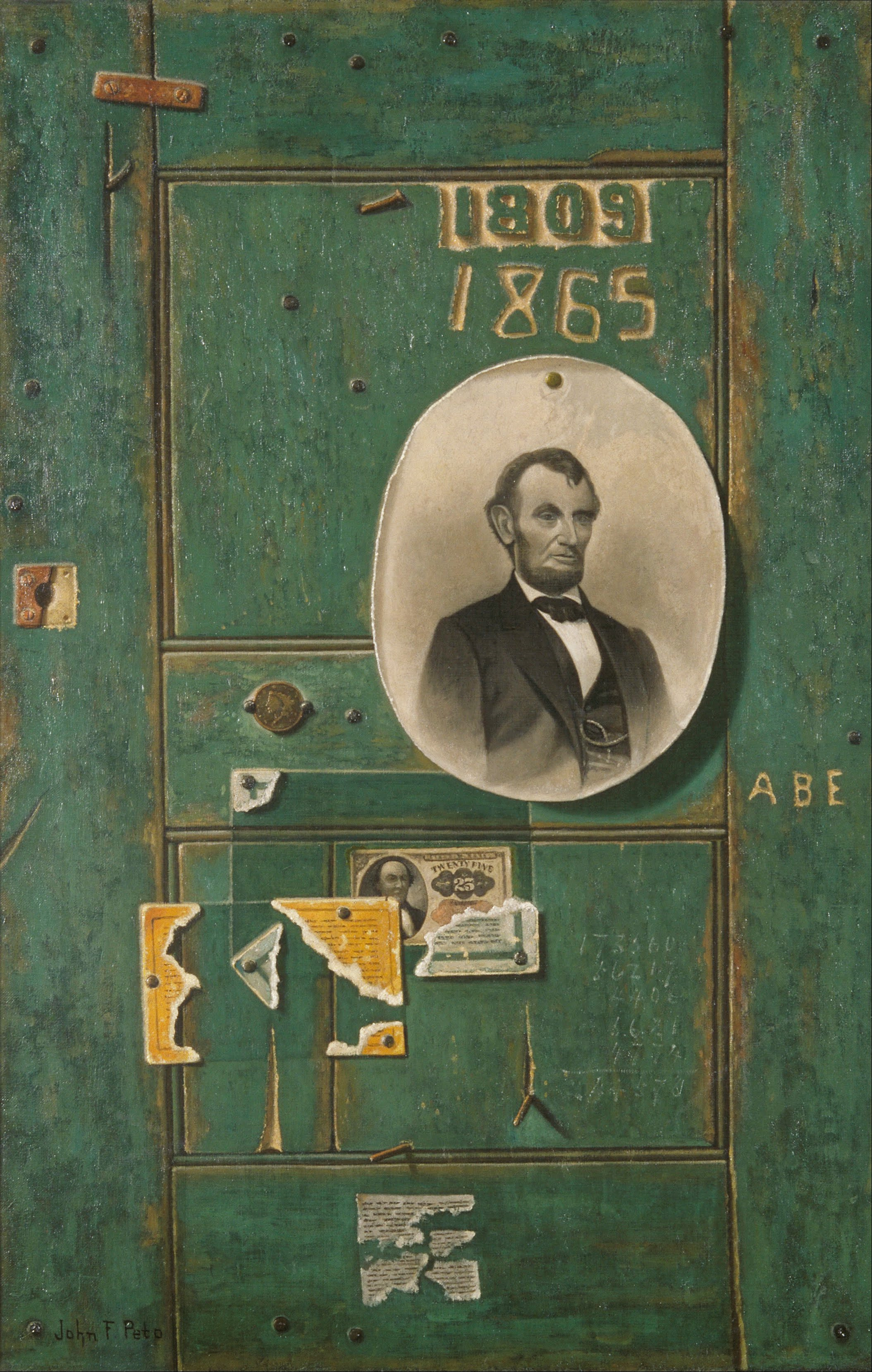
Reminiscences of 1865 (1901)
