= Anamorphosis =

Optical distortion used in art

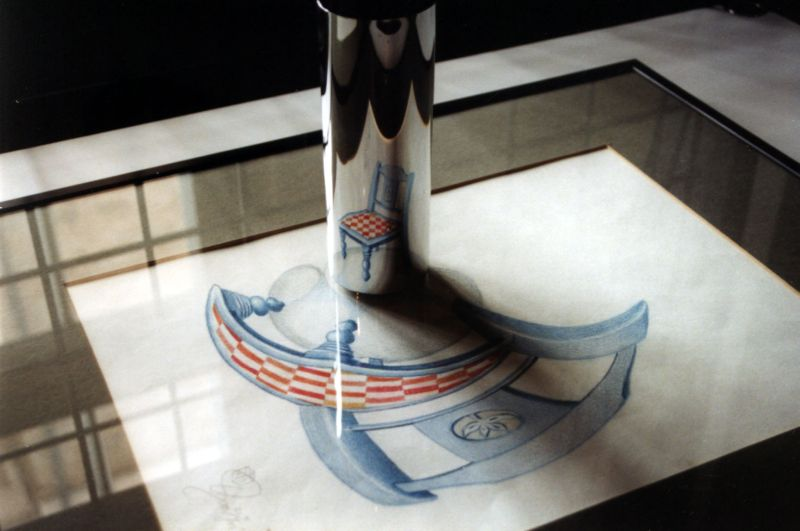
Example of mirror anamorphosis

Anamorphosis is a distorted projection that requires the viewer to occupy a specific vantage point, use special devices, or both to view a recognizable image. It is used in painting, photography, sculpture and installation art, toys, and film special effects. The word is derived from the Greek prefix ἀνα- (ana-), meaning "back" or "again", and the word morphe, meaning "shape" or "form". Extreme anamorphosis has been used by artists to disguise caricatures, erotic and scatological scenes, and other furtive images from a casual spectator, while revealing an undistorted image to the knowledgeable viewer.

== Types of projection ==
There are two main types of anamorphosis: perspective (oblique) and mirror (catoptric). More complex anamorphoses can be devised using distorted lenses, mirrors, or other optical transformations.

An oblique anamorphism forms an affine transformation of the subject. Early examples of perspectival anamorphosis date to the Renaissance of the fifteenth century and largely relate to religious themes.

With mirror anamorphosis, a conical or cylindrical mirror is placed on the distorted drawing or painting to reveal an undistorted image. The deformed picture relies on laws regarding angles of incidence of reflection. The length of the flat drawing's curves are reduced when viewed in a curved mirror, such that the distortions resolve into a recognizable picture. Unlike perspective anamorphosis, catoptric images can be viewed from many angles. The technique was originally developed in China during the Ming Dynasty, and the first European manual on mirror anamorphosis was published around 1630 by the mathematician Vaulezard.

Channel anamorphosis or tabula scalata has a different image on each side of a corrugated carrier. A straight frontal view shows an unclear mix of the images, while each image can be viewed correctly from a certain angle.

== History ==
=== Prehistory ===
The Stone Age cave paintings at Lascaux may make use of anamorphic technique, because the oblique angles of the cave would otherwise result in distorted figures from a viewer's perspective.

=== Classical antiquity ===
The ancient historians Pliny and Tzetzes both record a sculpture competition between Alcamenes and Phidias to create an image of Minerva. Alcamenes' sculpture was beautiful, while Phidias' had grotesque proportions. Yet once both had been mounted on pillars, the decelerated perspective made Phidias' Minerva beautiful, and Alcamenes' ugly. Plato also discussed this sort of sculpture in the Sophist.

=== Renaissance ===
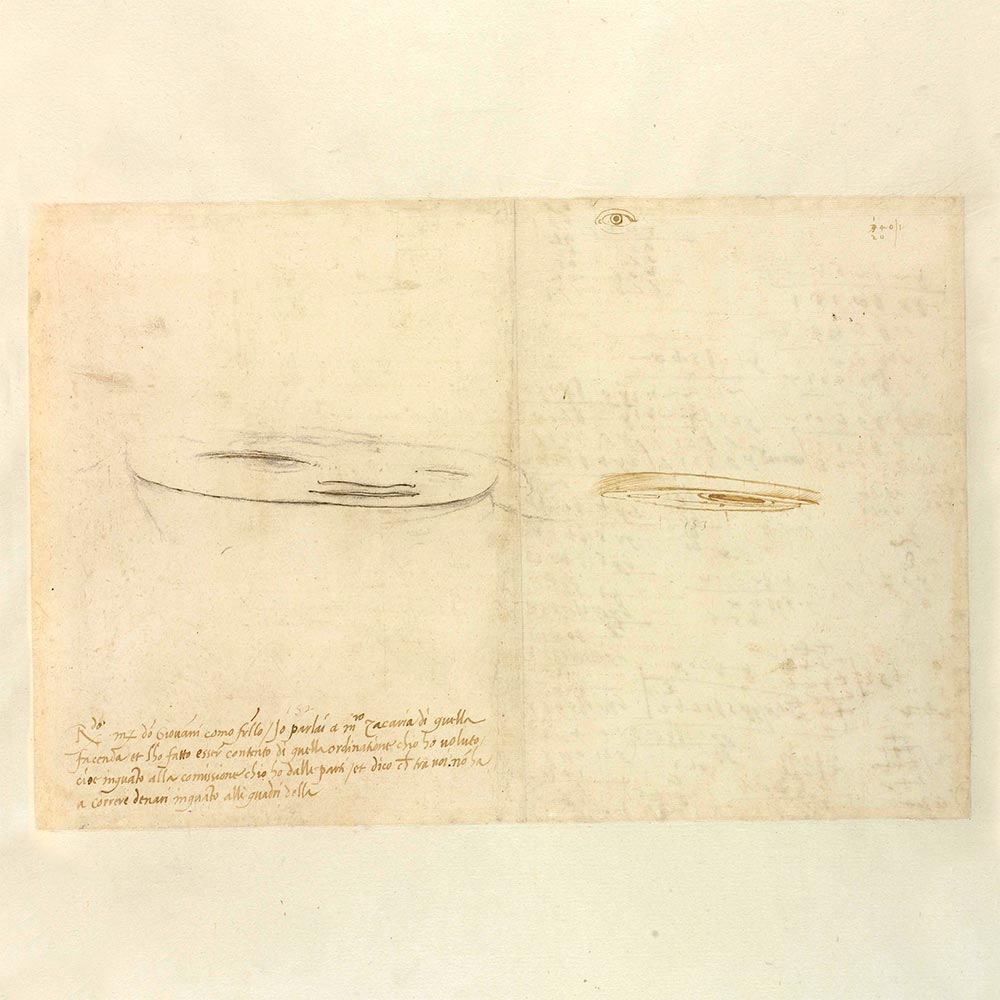
Two anamorphic drawings by Leonardo da Vinci, 1515

Holbein's The Ambassadors with a memento mori anamorph skull in the foreground, 1533

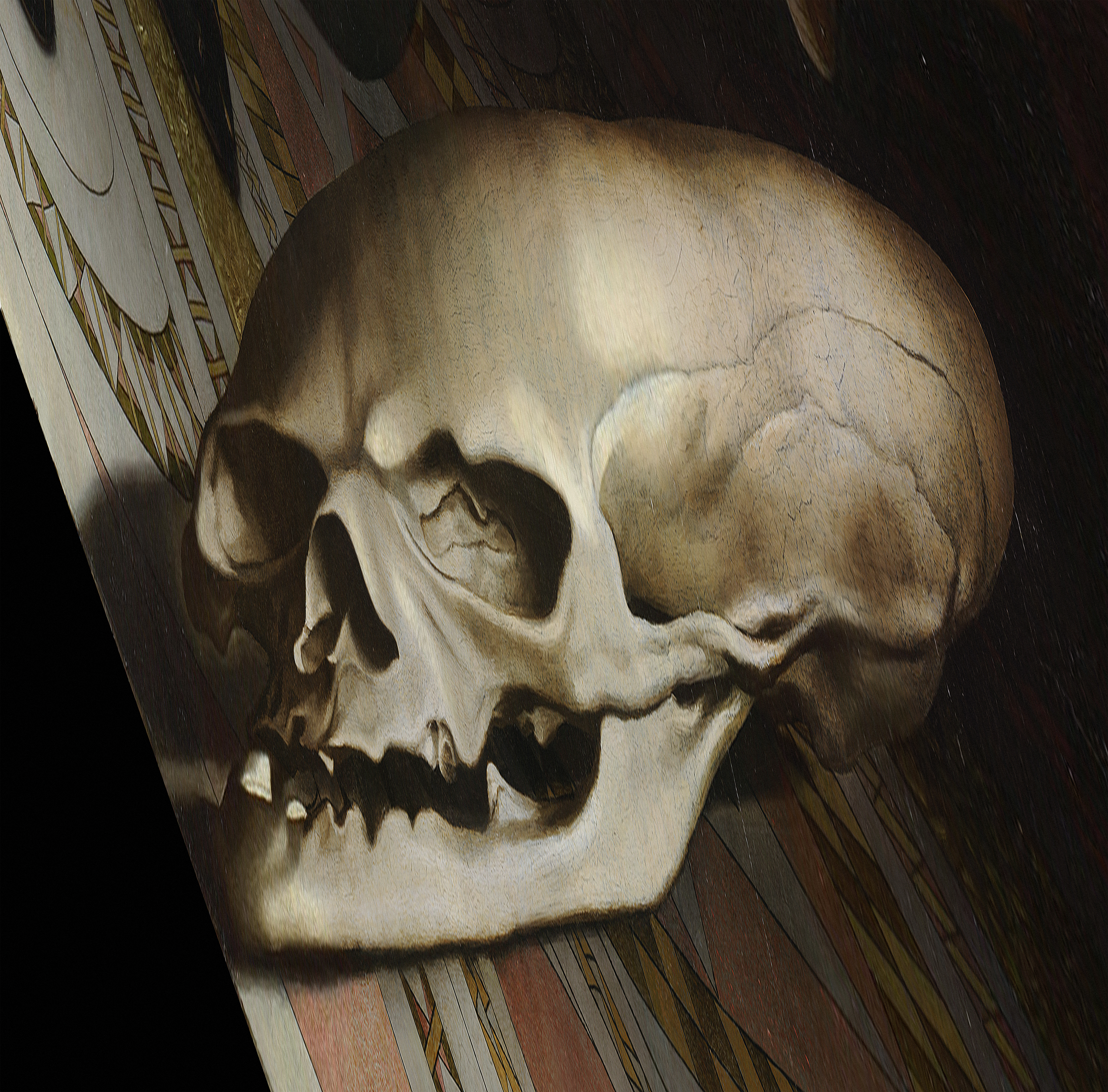
Viewed from the correct oblique angle, the diagonal in The Ambassadors transforms into an undistorted memento mori.

Artists' experimentation with optics and perspective during the Renaissance advanced anamorphic technique, at a time when science and religious thought were equally important to its growth in Europe. Leonardo's Eye by Leonardo da Vinci, included in the Codex Atlanticus (1483-1518), is the earliest known example. He later completed several large-scale anamorphic commissions for the King of France.

Giacomo Barozzi da Vignola credited Tommaso Laureti as the originator of a perspectival anamorphic technique in one of the earliest written descriptions in The Two Rules of Practical Perspective, compiled between 1530 and 1540 but not published until 1583. Many other descriptions and examples were created before 1583 without access to Vignola's work.

The Ambassadors (1533) by Hans Holbein the Younger is known for the prominent grey diagonal slash across the bottom of the frame which, when viewed from an acute angle, resolves into the image of a human skull. It has been hypothesized that the painting, regarded as a vanitas – a meditation on the transience of life including the skull as a memento mori – was intended to be hung alongside stairs to startle viewers with the sudden appearance of a skull. Four centuries later, psychoanalyst Jaques Lacan noted in 'Of the Gaze as Objet Petit a' (1973) that the use of anamorphism, particularly in this painting, is one of the few methods for making viewers aware of their gaze.

=== 17th century ===
By the 17th century, a revival of fantastical anamorphic imagery occurred. Magical and religious connotations were largely abandoned, and the images were understood as a scientific curiosity. Two major works on perspective were published: Perspective (1612) by Salomon de Caus, and Curious Perspective (1638) by Jean-Francois Niceron. Each contained extensive scientific and practical information on anamorphic imagery. In Niceron's work, three types of large-scale anamorphism are explained: 'optical' (looking horizontally); 'anoptric' (looking upwards); and 'catoptric' (looking down i.e. from a mezzanine). A conical perspective is also described. Towards the end of the century, Charles Ozanam's Mathematical Recreations widely popularized the techniques for the creation of anamorphic images.

Between 1669 and 1685, both perspective and mirror anamorphosis were introduced in China by the Jesuits to the Kangxi Emperor and monks at the Peking Mission. However, Chinese production of anamorphic images were already occurring on a large scale during the late Ming Dynasty. The images were mostly created freehand, unlike the grid system used in the west. As Chinese anamorphoses primarily focused on erotic themes, Jesuit influence is unlikely. It is considered likely that Chinese catoptric techniques, which are technically unrelated to geometric anamorphosis, influenced European mirror anamorphosis, and not the other way around.

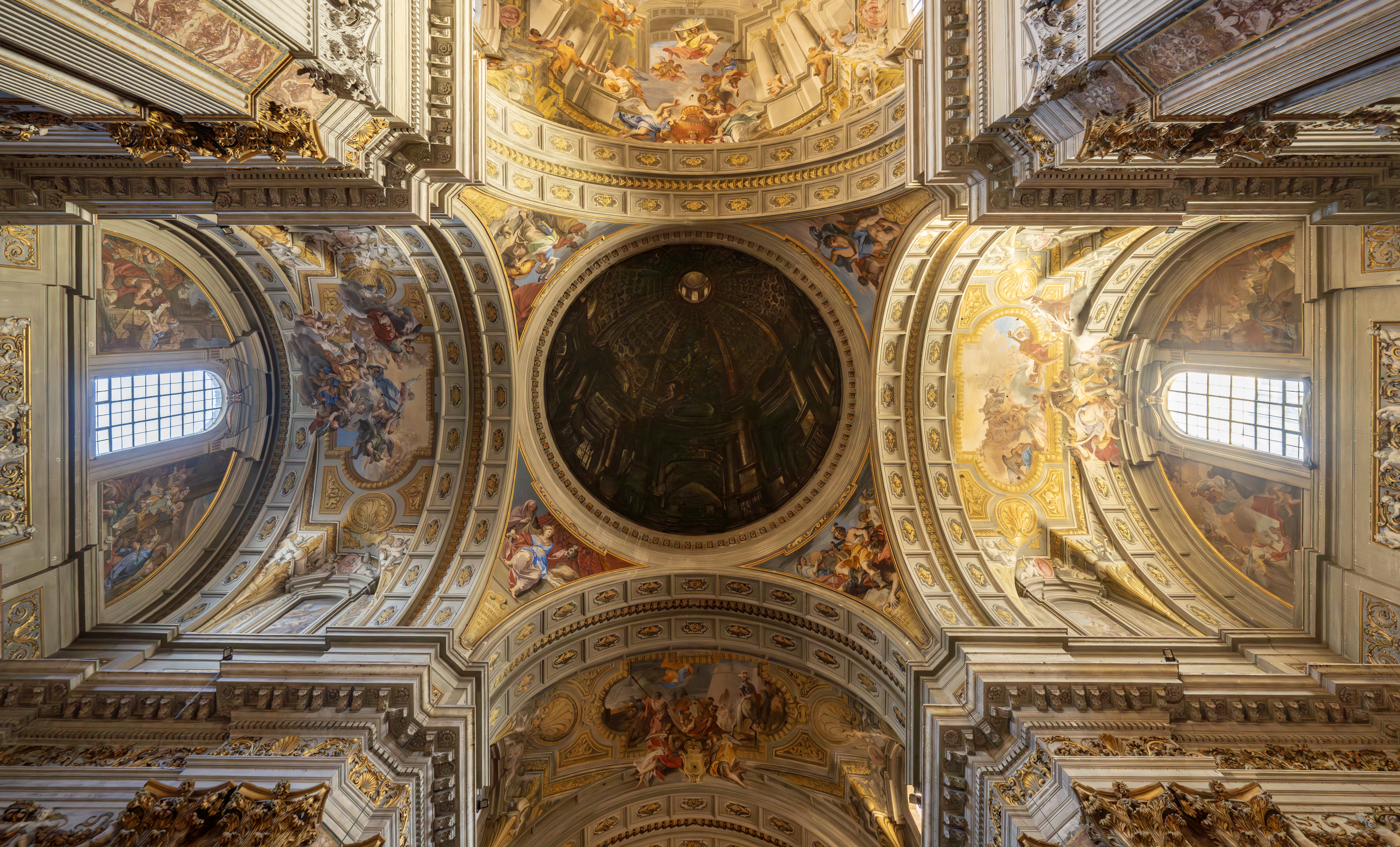
Andrea Pozzo's painted dome in the Church of St. Ignazio, 1690

Baroque trompe-l'œil murals often used anamorphism to combine actual architectural elements with illusory painted elements to create a seamless effect when viewed from a specific location. The dome and vault of the Church of St. Ignazio in Rome, painted by Andrea Pozzo, represented the pinnacle of illusion. Due to neighboring monks complaining about blocked light, Pozzo was commissioned to paint the ceiling to look like the inside of a dome, instead of building a real dome. As the ceiling is flat, there is only one spot where the illusion is perfect and a dome looks undistorted.

Anamorphosis could be used to conceal images for privacy or personal safety, and many secret portraits were created of deposed royalty. A well-known anamorphic portrait of the English King Edward VI was completed in 1546, only visible when viewed through a hole in the frame. It was later hung at Whitehall Palace, and may have influenced Shakespeare during the writing of Richard II. Many anamorphic portraits of King Charles I were created and shared following his 1649 execution. A secret mirror anamorphosis portrait of Bonnie Prince Charlie, held at the West Highland Museum, can only be recognized when a polished cylinder is placed in the correct position. To possess such an image would have been seen as treason in the aftermath of the 1746 Battle of Culloden.

The memento mori theme continued into this period, such as in an Anamorphic Painting of Adam and Eve, on display at the Wadsworth Atheneum in Hartford, Connecticut. This painting by an unknown Italian artist of the 17th or early 18th century portrays the Biblical couple, along with a large unidentified male face at the top, and a large human skull at the bottom. The images are distorted when viewed straight on, and can only be seen by peeking through one of two holes at each end of the surrounding frame. The painting includes a Latin religious inscription adapted from John 14:6, ending with the words memento mori.

=== 18th and 19th century ===
The eighteenth century saw anamorphism completely enter the realm of entertainment and diversion, as well as the widest dissemination of the technique.

By the 19th century, a revival of interest in anamorphism for architectural illusion occurred, as well as a fashion for classical themes. Reprints of Renaissance-era engravings became popular, as did political, obscene and popular subjects. Edgar Allan Poe's short story "Ligeia" describes a room filled with "simple monstrosities" that resolve in to "an endless succession of ... ghastly forms" as the narrator walks through the room. This mass popularization was to later have effect on the Surrealists.

=== 20th century ===
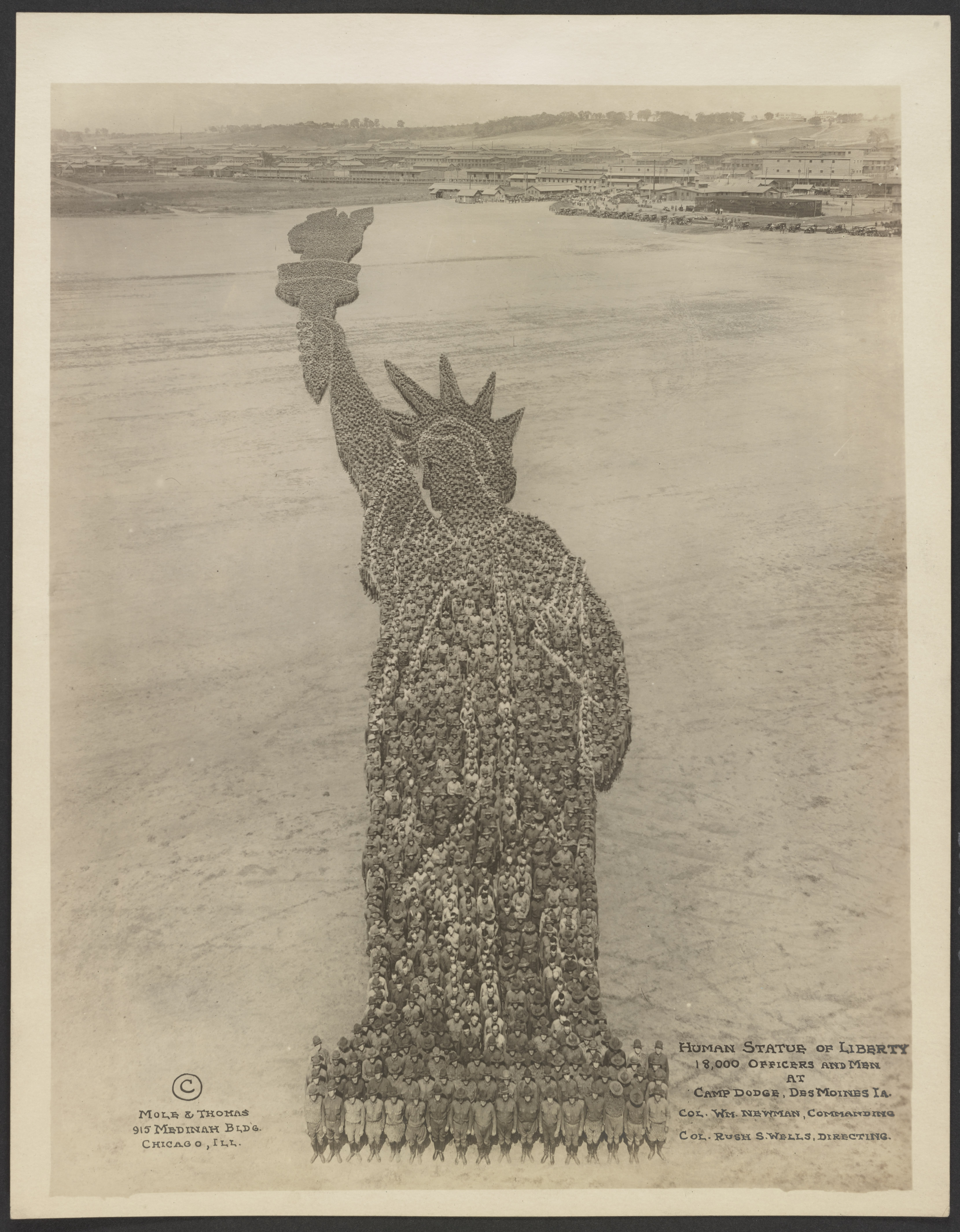
As seen from the viewing tower

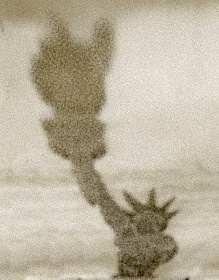
Approximation of the same scene from directly above

Mole & Thomas, Human Statue of Liberty (1919), 12,000 people in the flame of the torch, 6,000 in the rest of the shape.

By the twentieth century, some artists wanted to renew the technique of anamorphosis for aesthetic and conceptual effect. During the First World War, Arthur Mole, an American commercial photographer, used anamorphic techniques to create patriotic images from massive assembled groups of soldiers and reservists. When seen from a tower at their base, the gathered people resolved into recognizable pictures.

Marcel Duchamp was interested in anamorphosis. His last work Given: 1. The Waterfall, 2. The Illuminating Gas (1946–66) used mild anamorphosis to force viewers into the position of peep-hole voyeurs in order to see a nude, anonymous human body.

Surrealist artist Salvador Dalí used extreme foreshortening and anamorphism in his paintings and works. A glass floor installed in a room next to his studio enabled radical perspective studies from above and below. The Dalí Theatre and Museum features a three-dimensional anamorphic living-room installation; the Mae West Lips Sofa that looks like the face of the film star when seen from a certain viewpoint. Interestingly, Lacan also compared Holbein's 16th-century painting to Dali's imagery, rather than the other way around.

== Impossible objects ==
Necker cube on the left, impossible cube on the right

In the twentieth century, artists began to play with perspective by drawing "impossible objects". These objects included stairs that always ascend, or cubes where the back meets the front. Such works were popularized by the artist M. C. Escher and the mathematician Roger Penrose. Although referred to as "impossible objects", such objects as the Necker cube and the Penrose triangle can be sculpted in 3-D by using anamorphic illusion. When viewed at a certain angle, such sculptures appear as the so-called impossible objects.

== Ames rooms ==
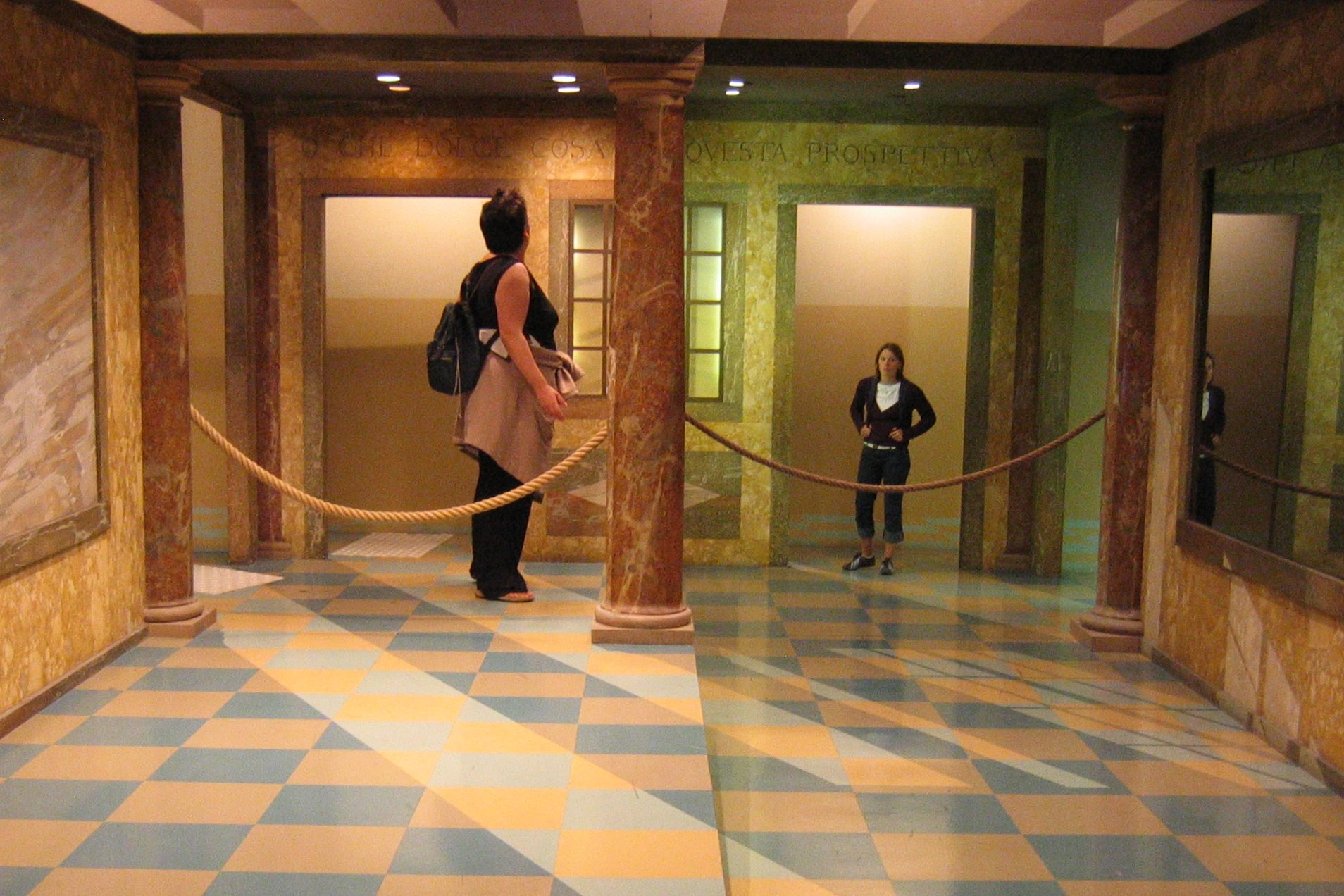
Ames room forced perspective

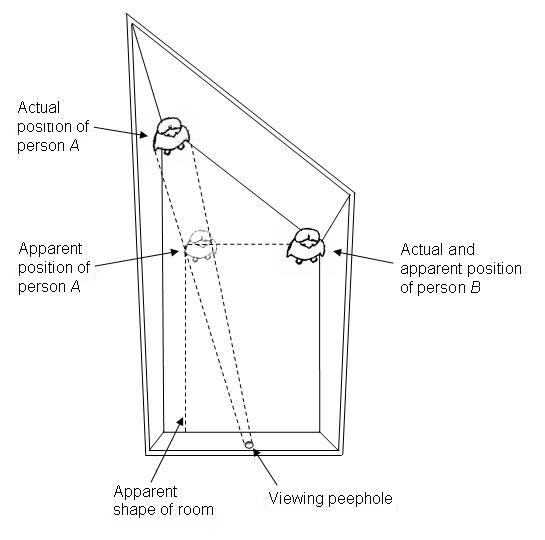
Ames room

The Ames room was invented by American scientist Adelbert Ames Jr. in 1946. When viewed through a peephole, the room appears to have normal perspective. However, all other viewpoints reveal that the room is constructed of irregular trapezoids. Similar effects had been achieved during the Renaissance through the use of "accelerated perspective" in stage design. These included productions by Scamozzi (1588-9), Furtenbach (1625), Sabbattini (1637) and Troili (1672).

One of the most interesting effects of an Ames room is that the distorted perspective can make people and objects look much bigger or smaller than they really are. For this reason, Ames rooms are widely used in cinema for practical special effects. A well-known example is the homes in the Shire from the Lord of the Rings and The Hobbit films. Through the use of forced perspective, the character of Gandalf appeared much larger than the characters of Frodo and Bilbo, without the use of digital effects.

== Practical uses ==
Cinemascope, Panavision, Technirama, and other widescreen formats use anamorphosis to project a wider image from a narrower film frame. The IMAX company uses even more extreme anamorphic transformations to project moving images from a flat film frame onto the inside of a hemispheric dome, in its "Omnimax" or "IMAX Dome" process.

The technique of anamorphic projection can be seen quite commonly on text written at a very flat angle on roadways, such as "Bus Lane" or "Children Crossing", to make it easily read by drivers who otherwise would have difficulty reading obliquely as the vehicle approaches the text; when the vehicle is nearly above the text, its true abnormally elongated shape can be seen. Similarly, in many sporting stadiums, especially in Rugby football in Australia, it is used to promote company brands which are painted onto the playing surface; from the television camera angle, the writing appear as signs standing vertically within the field of play.

Much writing on shop windows is in principle anamorphic, as it was written mirror-reversed on the inside of the window glass.

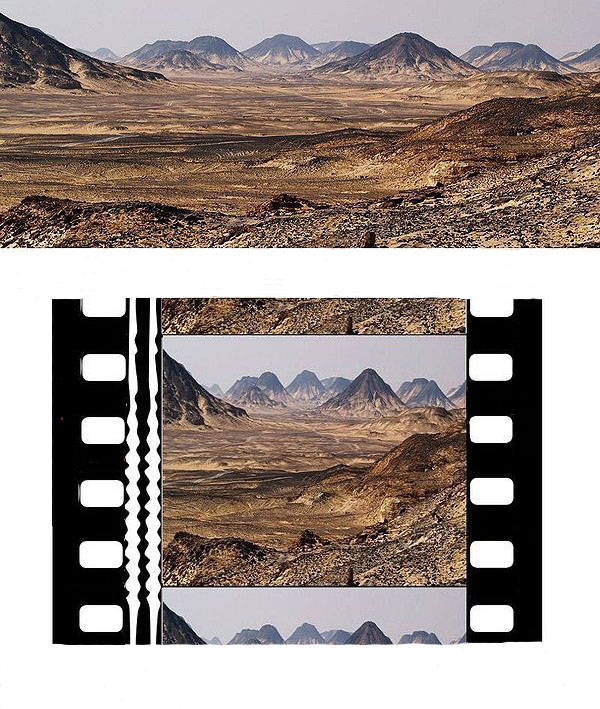
Comparison between the "normal" picture and the anamorphic picture on a 35 mm film in Cinemascope format

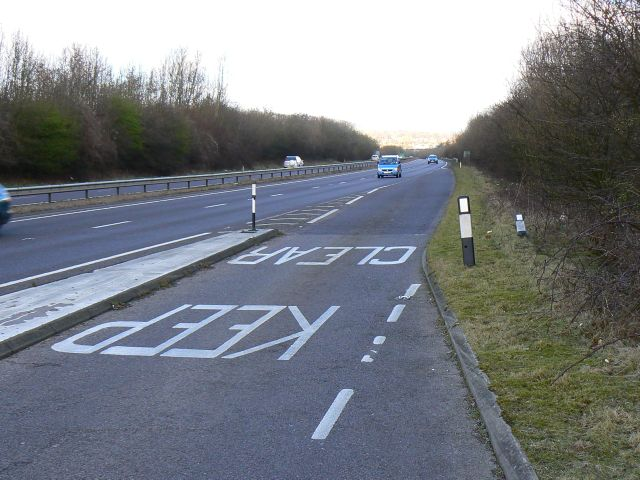
Road surface marking warning text is predistorted for oblique viewing by motorists

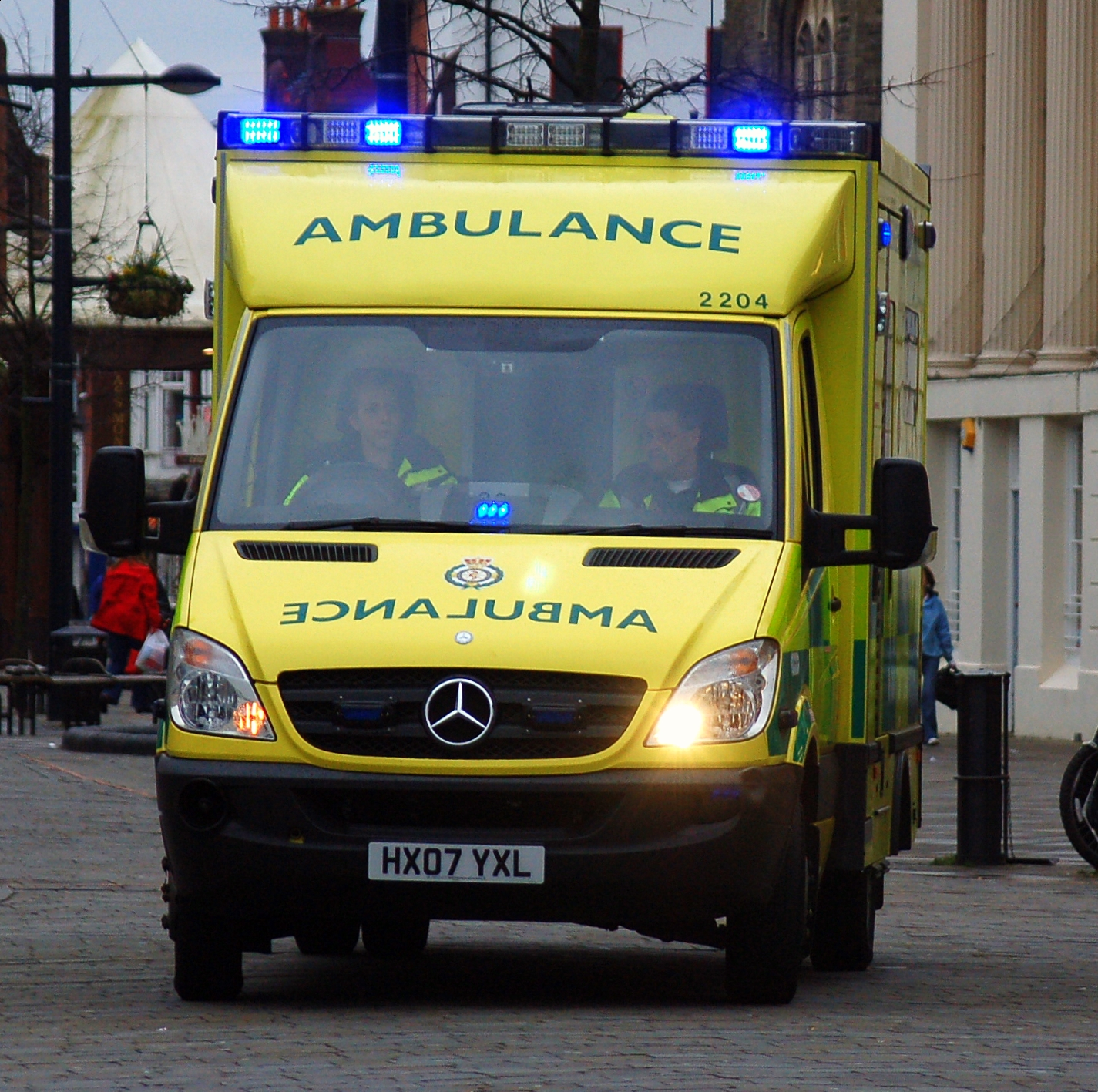
Mirror anamorphosis on the lower front of an ambulance, so the writing appears right way round in rear view mirrors of vehicles ahead of it in traffic

== In the work of contemporary artists ==
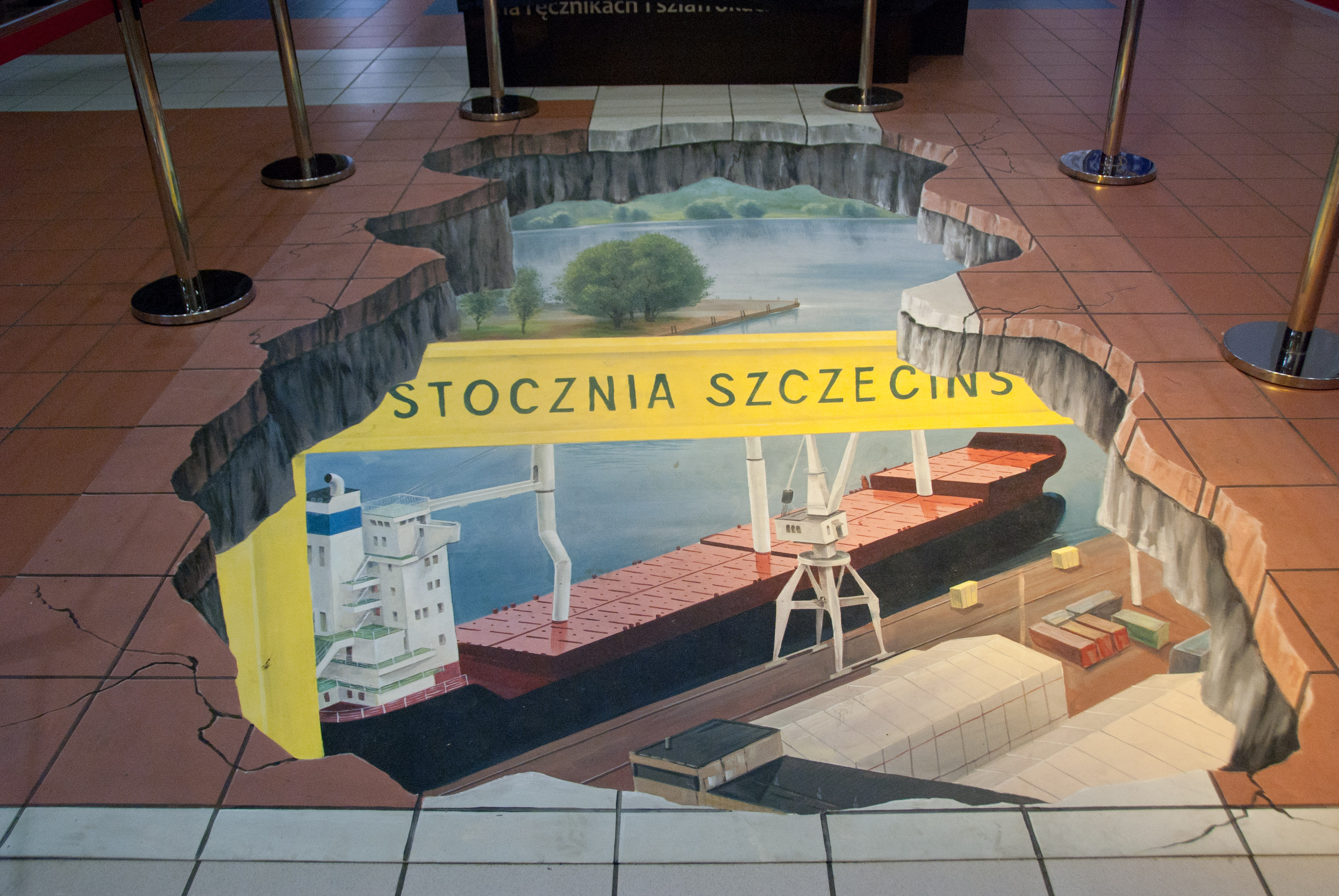
Anamorphic street art by Manfred Stader

While not as widespread in contemporary art, anamorphosis as a technique has been used by contemporary artists in painting, photography, printmaking, sculpture, film and video, digital art and games, holography, street art and installation. The latter two art forms are largely practised in public areas such as parks, city centres and transit stations.

In 1975 a major exhibition was held focusing exclusively on anamorphic imagery: Anamorphoses: Games of Perception and Illusion in Art. The artist Jan Beutener created The Room, a major new installation specifically for the exhibit.

=== Sculpture and installation ===
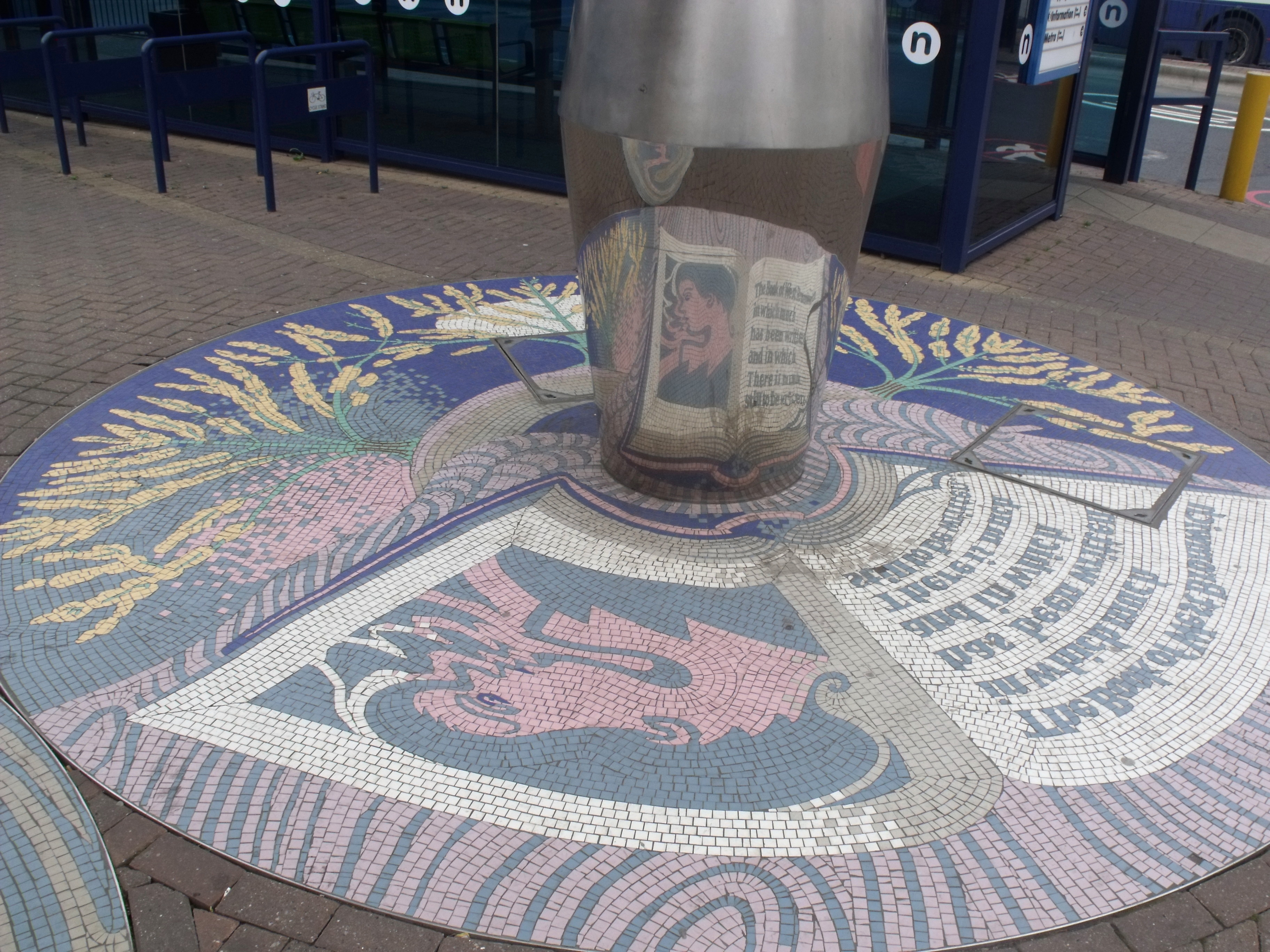
Anamorphic mosaic art

Since the mid-20th century, many artists have made use of anamorphosis in public artworks. American land art pioneer Michael Heizer's Complex One (1972-1974), a massive earth and concrete structure in the Nevada desert, creates a rectangular frame for a mastaba when viewed from a specific location. Inspired by Luxor and other ancient monumental sites, it is part of the larger work City, an enormous sculpture running a mile and a half long.

Shigeo Fukuda, a Japanese artist and designer globally renowned for his satirical posters on anti-war and environmental advocacy, created posters and sculptures making use of both types of anamorphosis in the 1970s and 1980s. He also wrote multiple books on the topic of optical illusions.

Felice Varini's 2014 work Three Ellipses for Three Locks in Hasselt, Belgium is an image of three loops that are made up of segments painted on to over 100 buildings. It is only visible from a specific vantage point over the city.

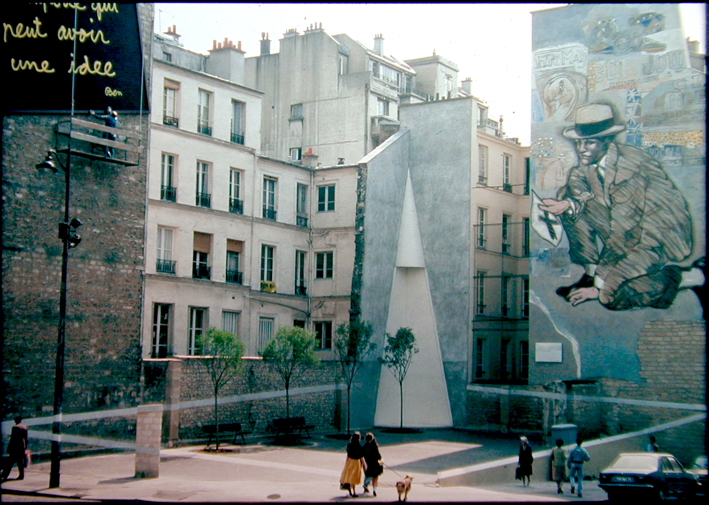
Jean-Max Albert, Un carré pour un square, from the specific vantage point, Place Fréhel, Paris (1988)

French artists that have created recent anamorphic installations include François Abélanet and Jean-Max Albert.

Markus Raetz's Kopf is a large scale public installation that reveals the form of a person's head in profile when viewed from a specific vantage-point. It was installed in a public park in Basel, Switzerland.

While anamorphic images were not his exclusive area of focus, the American artist Jonathan Borofsky created installations in the 1980s using anamorphic techniques, exhibiting at institutions such as the Museum of Modern Art.

Jonty Hurwitz pioneered the use of a mathematical technique to create catoptric sculptures that resolve in a cylinder. In 2013 he produced a public work for the Savoy Hotel's River Room.

=== Drawing and painting ===
The Swedish artist Hans Hamngren produced and exhibited many examples of mirror anamorphosis in the 1960s and 1970s.

Sara Willet's paintings focus on anamorphic images.

Belgian artist Isabelle de Borchgrave also widely uses anamorphosis in her paintings, whereby her original drawings or paintings are stretched out and revert to a 'normal' dimension once the drawing or painting is pleated to its final form.

=== Photography ===
Beginning in 1967, Dutch artist Jan Dibbets based an entire series of photographic work titled Perspective Corrections on the distortion of reality through perspective anamorphosis. This involved the incorporation of land art into his work, where areas dug out of the Earth formed squares from specific perspectives.

=== Street art ===
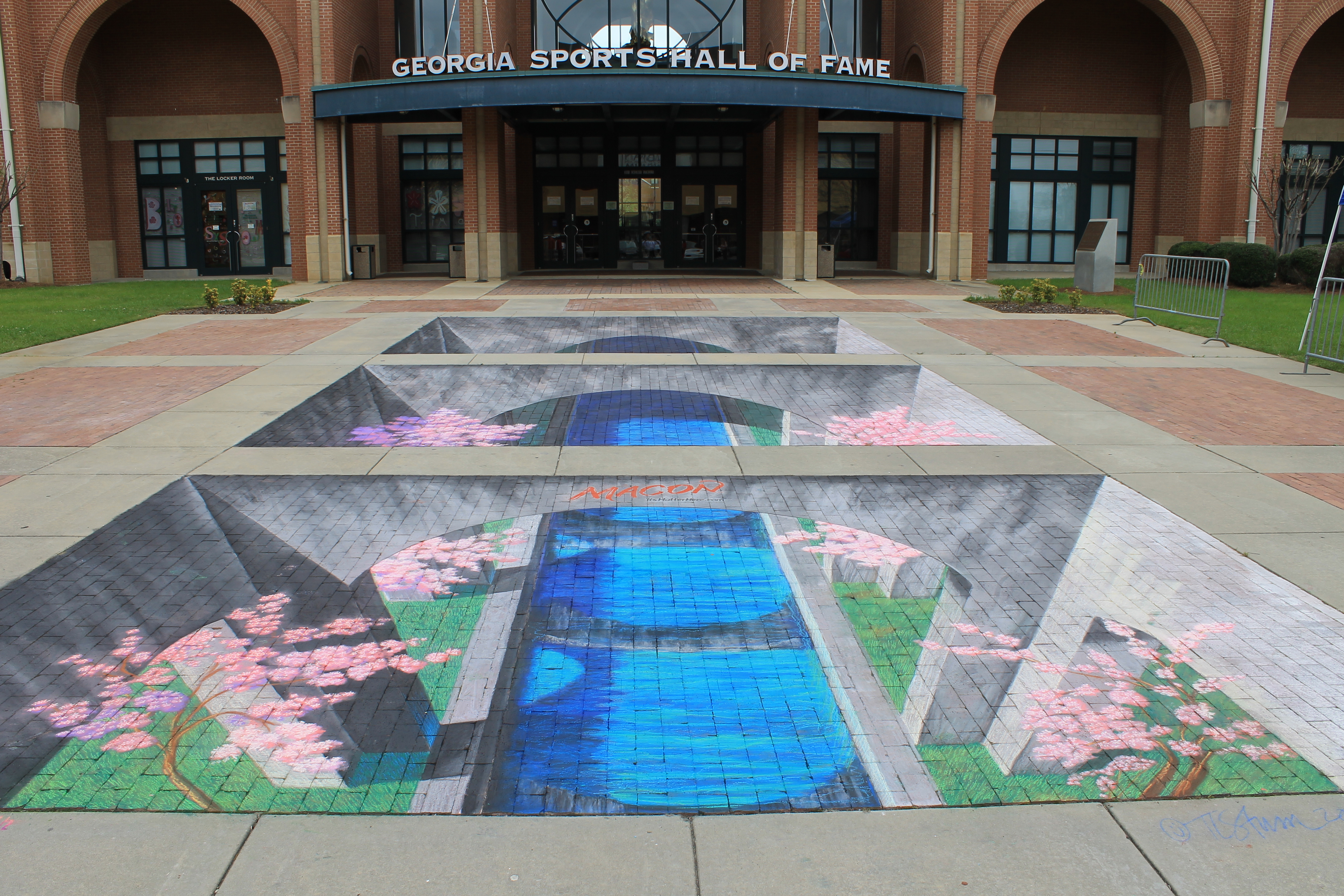
3d anamorphic sidewalk painting by Tracy Lee Stum at the Macon, Georgia's International Cherry Blossom Festival in front of the Georgia Sports Hall of Fame

Anamorphic effects are popular in street art, sometimes called "Slant Art" when accomplished on sidewalks. Examples are the sidewalk chalk drawings of Kurt Wenner and Julian Beever, where the chalked image, the pavement, and the architectural surroundings all become part of an illusion. Art of this style can be produced by taking a photograph of an object or setting at a sharp oblique angle, then putting a grid over the photograph. Another elongated grid is placed on the sidewalk based on a specific perspective, and visual elements of one are transcribed into the other, one grid square at a time.

In 2016, the street artist JR completed a massive temporary anamorphic illusion over the Louvre's pyramid, making the modern structure disappear and the original building appear as though it was still in the 17th century.

== Gallery ==
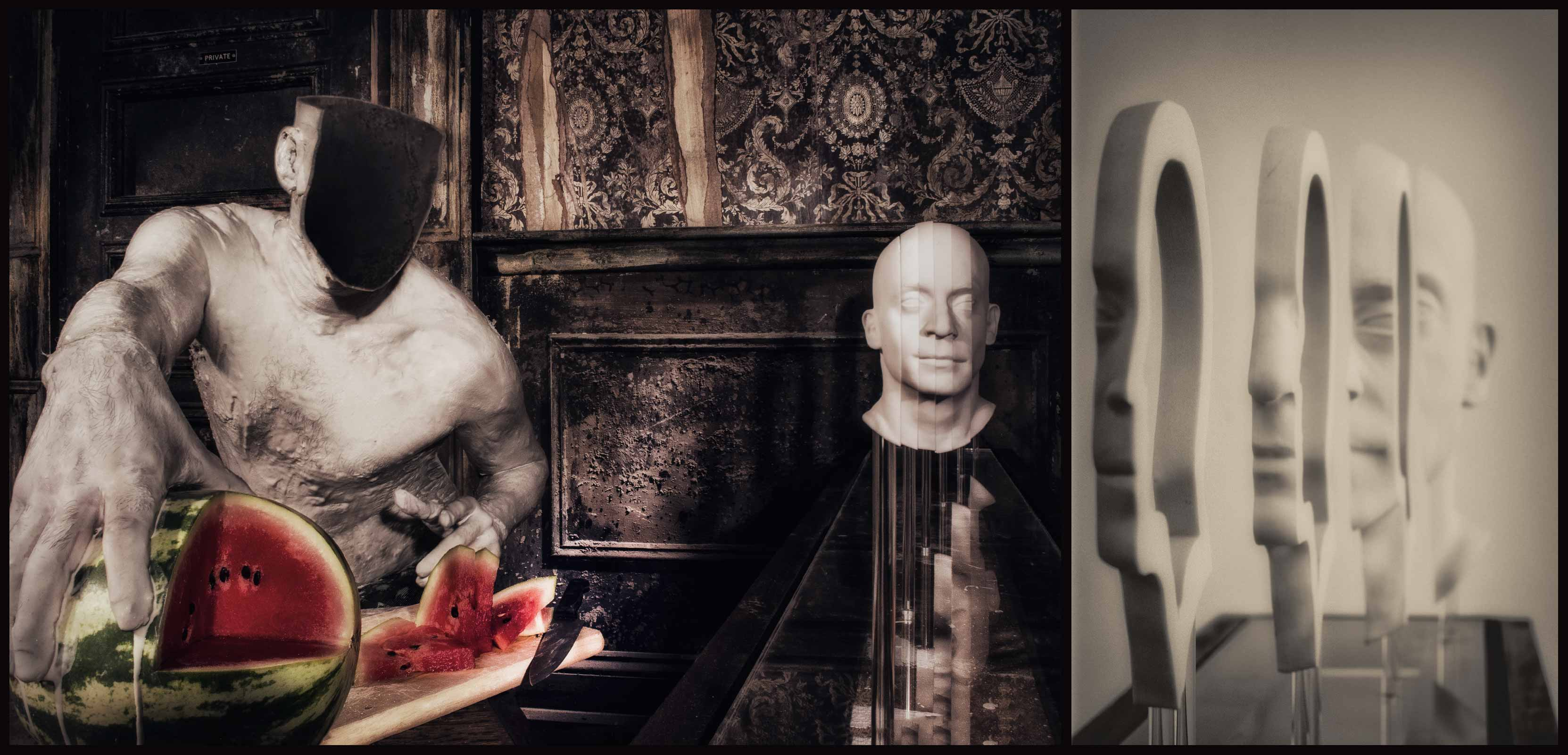
Hurwitz Singularity, anamorphic sculpture using perspective

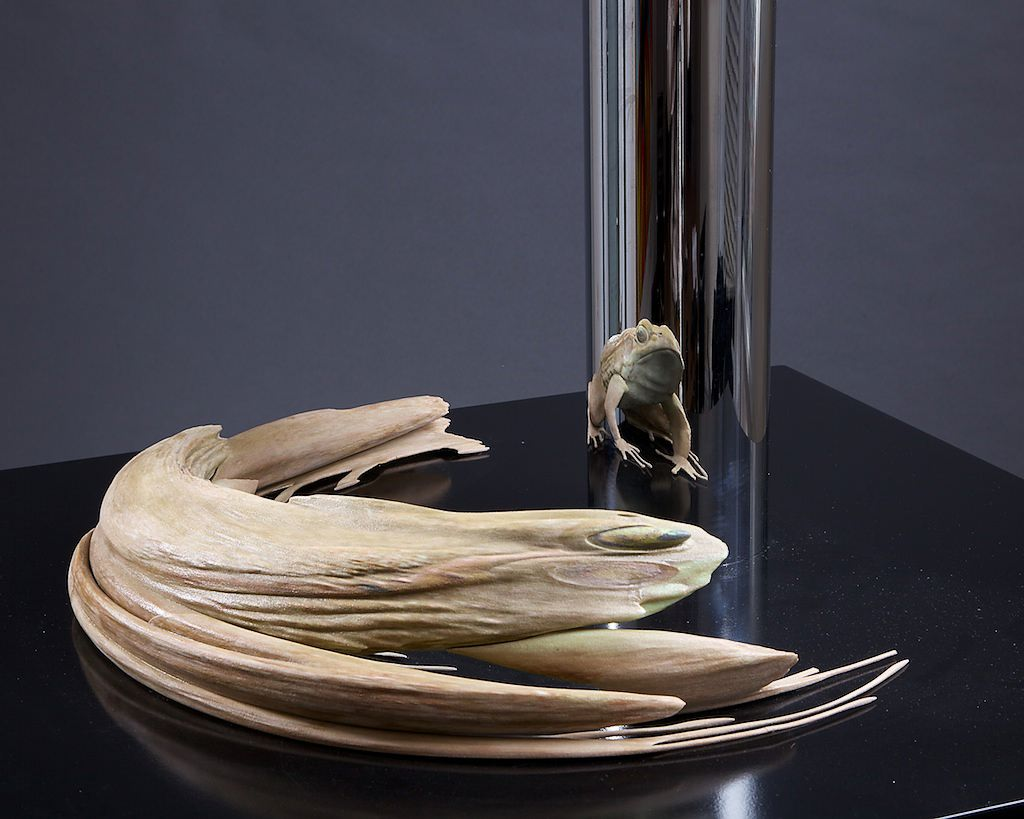
Anamorphic frog sculpture by Jonty Hurwitz

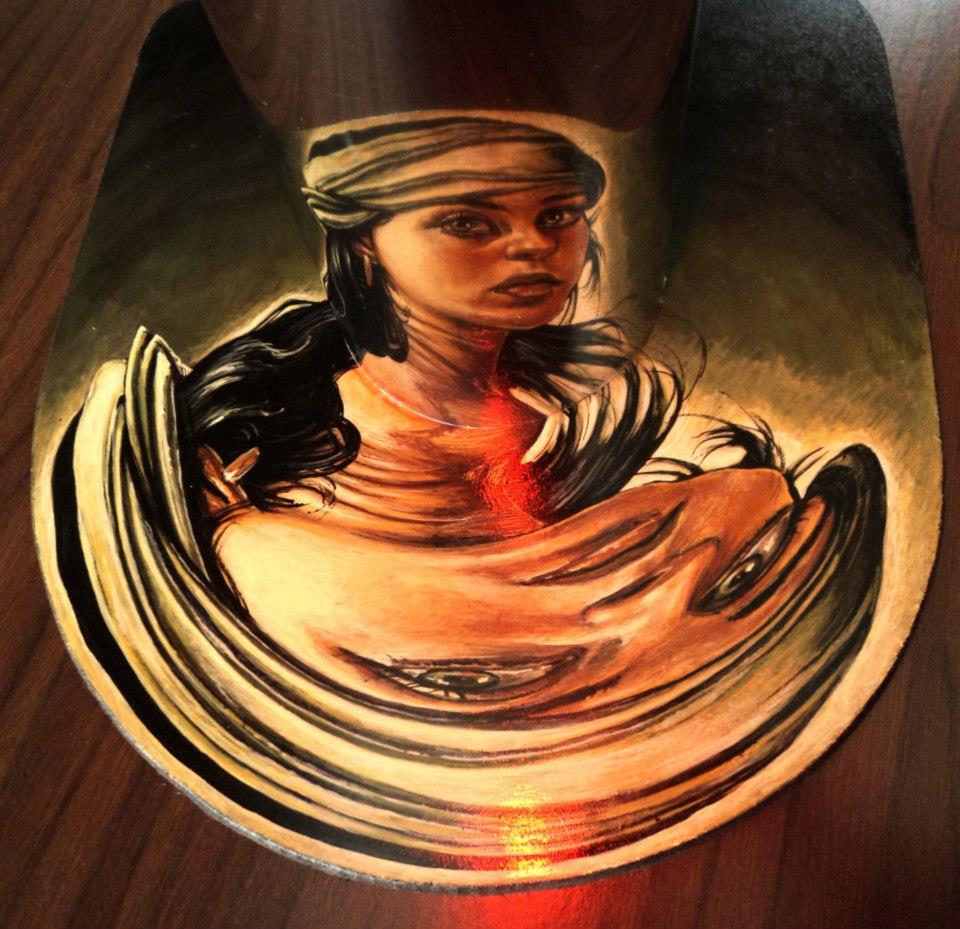
Vera Bugatti: cylindrical mirror anamorphosis with portrait

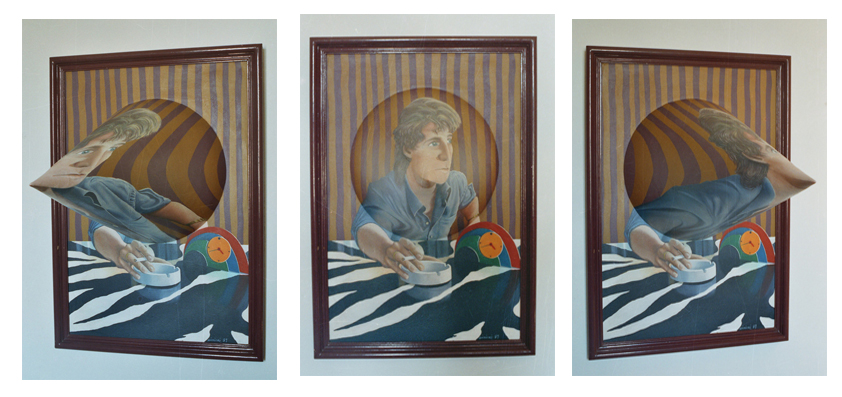
Three views of a conical anamorphosis by Dimitri Parant

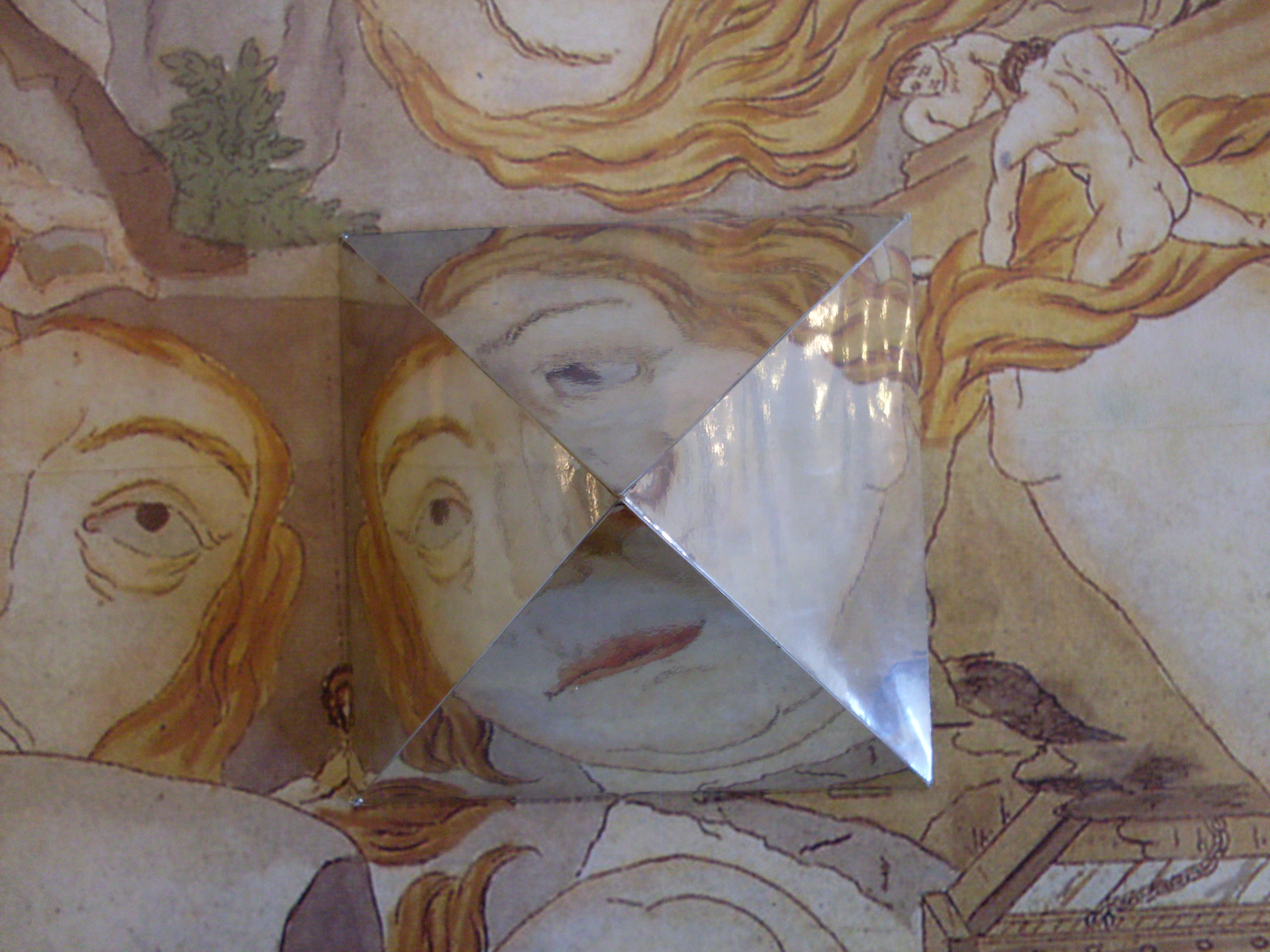
Pyramidal anamorphosis

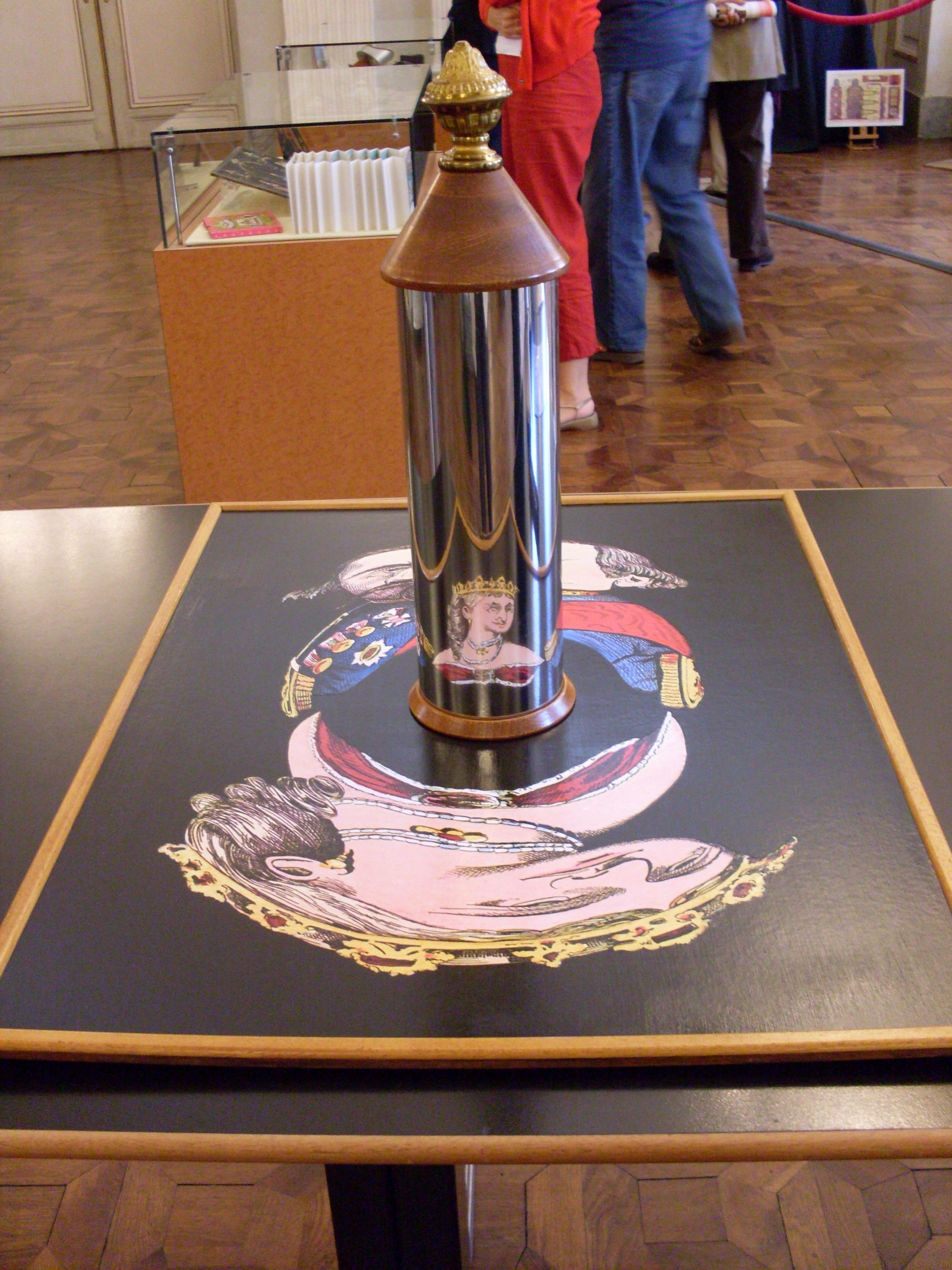
Cylindrical anamorphosis

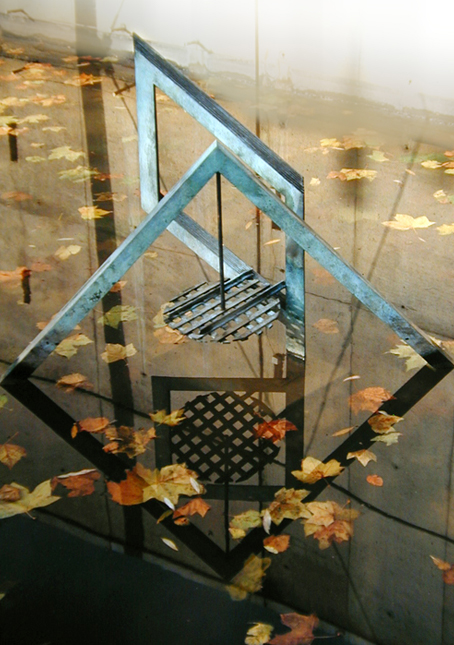
Jean-Max Albert, Reflet anamorphose, Bronze, Parc de la Villette (1985)

Anamorphic room by Leon keer, 1 room 4 different viewpoints, Escher Princessehof National Museum of Ceramics.

== Popular culture ==
Since the 18th century, anamorphosis has been a widespread art form in popular culture. It has been used for children's toys, album art, advertising, videogames and movies, among other things.

In the 1970s, albums for musicians Steeleye Span and Rick Wakeman featured anamorphic album art.

The 2009 video game Batman: Arkham Asylum has a series of riddles posed by the classic Batman antagonist The Riddler, the solution of which is based on perspective anamorphosis.

In 2013, Honda released a commercial which incorporated a series of illusions based on anamorphosis.

Tourists attractions employing large-scale illusory art allowing visitors to photograph themselves in fantastic scenes have opened in several Asian countries, such as the Trickeye Museum and Hong Kong 3D Museum.

OK Go makes repeated use of anamorphic illusions in the music video for The Writing's On the Wall.

The 2024 film Hanu-Man uses anamorphosis to depict Hanuman during a fight scene.

== See also ==
- Anamorphic widescreen, a widescreen video encoding concept
- Arthur Mole
- Image warping
- Mad Fold-in
- Perspective control
- Panomorph

=== Artists ===
- Jonty Hurwitz
- Jean-Max Albert
- Hans Holbein the Younger
- Patrick Hughes
- William Kentridge
- István Orosz
- Andrea Pozzo
- Georges Rousse
- Edward Ruscha

==== Sidewalk artists ====
- Julian Beever
- Leon Keer
- Tracy Lee Stum
- Kurt Wenner

== Bibliography ==
- Andersen, Kirsti (1996) "The mathematical treatment of anamorphoses from Piero della Francesca to Niceron", pp 3 to 28 in History of Mathematics, J.W. Dauben, M. Folkerts, E. Knobloch & H. Wussing editors, ISBN 0-12-204055-4 MR 1388783.
- Baltrušaitis, Jurgis (1976) "Anamorphic Art". Trans. W.J. Strachn. Harry N. Abrams Inc. New York. Standard Book Number: 8109-0662-7. Library of Congress: 77-73789 ISBN 978-0810906624
- Baltrušaitis, Jurgis (1984) Anamorphoses ou Thaumaturgus opticus. Flammarion, Paris. ISBN 978-2080126047
- Behrens, R.R. (2009a). "Adelbert Ames II" entry in Camoupedia: A Compendium of Research on Art, Architecture and Camouflage. Dysart IA: Bobolink Books, pp. 25–26. ISBN 0-9713244-6-8.
- Behrens, R.R. (2009b). "Ames Demonstrations in Perception" in E. Bruce Goldstein, ed., Encyclopedia of Perception. Sage Publications, pp. 41–44. ISBN 978-1-4129-4081-8.
- Cole, Alison: Perspective (1992) Dorling Kindersley, London. ISBN 978-1564580689
- Damisch, Hubert: L'Origine de la perspective (1987) Flammarion, Paris. ISBN 978-2080126115
- De Rosa, Agostino; D'Acunto, Giuseppe (2002) La Vertigine dello Sguardo. Tre saggi sulla rappresentazione anamorfica (The Vertigo of Sight. Three Essays on the Anamorphic Representation). Cafoscarina Publishing, Venice. ISBN 9788888613314
- De Rosa, Agostino (Ed), Jean François Nicéron (2012) Prospettiva, catottrica e magia artificiale (Jean François Nicéron. Perspective, catoptric and artificial magic), 2 Vols. with critical editions and translations of J. F. Nicéron's La Perspective curieuse and Thaumaturgus opticus. Marsilio, Venezia. ISBN 978-8854860322
- Du Breuil, La Pere (1649) La Perspective pratique. Paris.
- Fischer, Sören (2016) "Una vista amirabile": Remarks on the Illusionary Interplay Between Real and Painted Windows in 16th Century Italy, in The Most Noble of the Senses: Anamorphosis, Trompe-L'Oeil, and Other Optical Illusions in Early Modern Art, ed. by Lilian Zirpolo, Ramsey, New Jersey, ISBN 978-0-9972446-1-8, pp. 1–28.
- Foister, Susan, Roz Ashok, Wyld Martin. Holbein's Ambassadors. National Gallery Publications, London. ISBN 978-0300073263
- Haddock, Nickolas (2013) "Medievalism and Anamorphosis: Curious Perspectives on the Middle Ages," in Medievalism Now, ed. E.L. Risden, Karl Fugelso, and Richard Utz (special issue of The Year's Work in Medievalism, 28).
- Houle, Kelly (2003) Portrait of Escher: Behind the Mirror. M.C. Escher's Legacy. Springer-Verlag, Berlin, Heidelberg, New York.
- Kircher, Athanasius (1646) Ars Magna lucis et umbrae in decem Libros digesta. Rome.
- Lanners, Edi: Illusionen. VerlagC.J.Bucher GmbH, München und Luzern, 1973. ISBN 978-0030208911
- Leemann, Fred: Anamorphosen. DuMont Buchverlag, Köln, 1975. ISBN 978-9062100163
- Leemann, Fred: Hidden Images. Harry N. Abrams, Inc. Publishers, New York, 1976. ISBN 978-0810990197
- Maignan, Emmanuel (1648) Perspectiva horaria, sive de Horographia gnomonica.... Rome.
- Mastai, M. L. d'Otrange (1975) Illusion in Art. Abaris Books, New York. ISBN 978-0913870037
- Niceron, Jean-Francois (1638) La Perspective curieuse ou magie artificelle des effets merveilleux. Paris.
- Niceron, Jean-Francois (1646) Thaumaturgus opticus, seu Admiranda optices per radium directum, catoptrices per radium reflectum. Paris.
- North, John (2002) The Ambassadors' Secret. Hamblendon and London, London. ISBN 978-1852854478
- István, Orosz (2000) Artistic Expression of Mirror, Reflection and Perspective. Symmetry.

– (2002) Portland Press, London.

- István, Orosz (2003) The Mirrors of the Master. Escher Legacy. Springer-Verlag, Berlin, Heidelberg, New York.
- Quay, Stephen and Timothy (1991) De Artificiali Perspectiva, or Anamorphosis (film)
- Shickman, Allan: "Turning Pictures" in Shakespeare's England. University of N. Iowa, Cedar Falls Ia. Art Bulletin LIX/March 1, 1977.
- Sakane, Itsuo: A Museum of Fun (The Expanding Perceptual World) The Asahi Shimbun, Tokyo, 1979 (Part I.) 1984 (Part II.)
- Schott, Gaspar (1657) Magia universalis naturae et artis. Würzburg.
- Stillwell, John (1989) Mathematics and Its History, §7.2 Anamorphosis, pp 81,2, Springer ISBN 0-387-96981-0.
- The Arcimboldo Effect (1987) (exhibition catalogue - Palazzo Grassi, Velence) Gruppo Editoriale Fabbri, Bompiani, Milan.
