= Arthur Samuel =

Arthur Samuel may refer to:

- Arthur Samuel (computer scientist) (1901–1990), American computer scientist
- Arthur Samuel, 1st Baron Mancroft (1872–1942), British politician
- Arthur Samuel "Tubby" Allen (1894–1959), Australian Army general and accountant
- Arthur Samuel Atkinson (1833–1902), New Zealand politician and lawyer
- Arthur Samuel Brown (1885–1944), English footballer
- Arthur Samuel Garretson (1851–1917), American banker, businessman, and politician
- Arthur Samuel Goodeve (1860–1920), Canadian pharmacist and conservative politician
- Arthur Samuel Keene (1875–1966), American architect and co-founder of Keene & Simpson
- Arthur Samuel Kendall (1861–1944), Canadian physician and politician
- Arthur Samuel Mole (1889–1983), British-born American photographer
- Arthur Samuel Peake (1865–1929), English biblical scholar
- Arthur Samuels (1852–1925), Irish politician and judge
