= Tabula scalata =

Currugated picture with multiple images

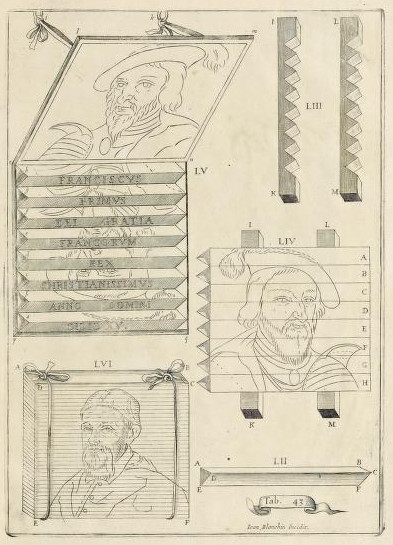
Illustration from Nicéron's 1638 La perspective curieuse

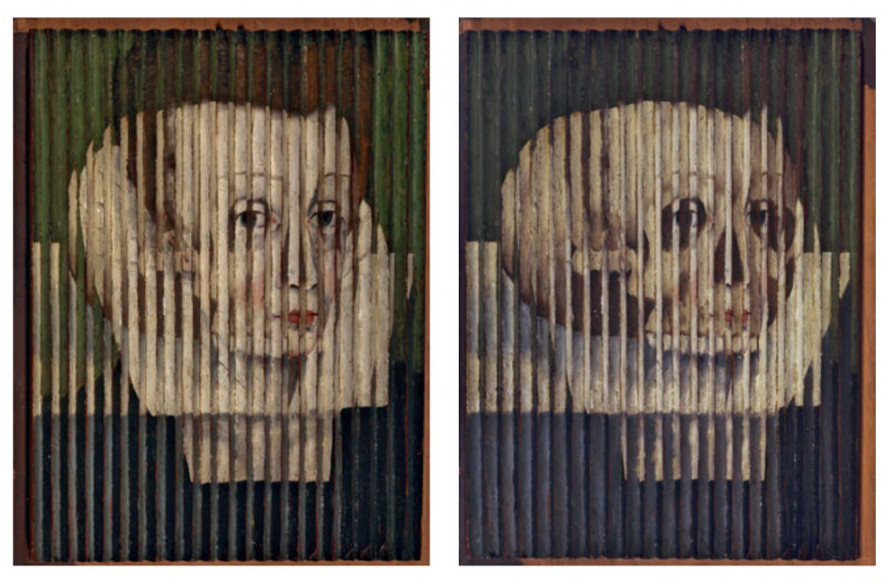
Two views of a tabula scalata oil painting from 1580 in the Scottish National Portrait Gallery

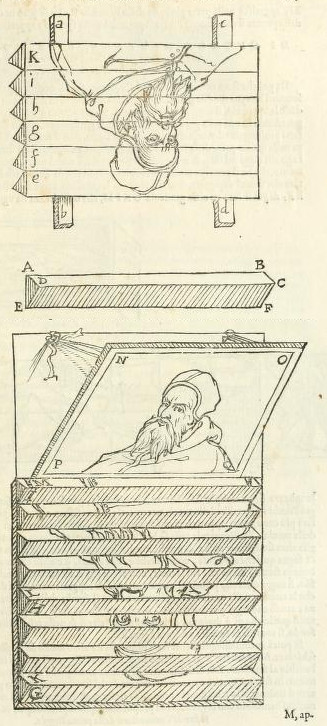
Tabula scalata illustration in Le dve regole della prospettiva pratica (1583)

Tabula scalata are pictures with two images divided into strips on different sides of a corrugated carrier. Each image can be viewed correctly from a certain angle. Most tabula scalata have the images in vertical lines so the picture seems to change from one image to another while walking past it. The top image on versions with horizontal strips could be seen via a mirror placed above the picture.

Some tabula scalata have the two pictures matched in shape and size, which practically creates a simple type of morphing effect when the viewing angle changes.

A variation, known as "triscenorama" or "tabula stritta" has three images: two on each side of perpendicular slats in front of the third picture.

The basic idea of tabula scalata and tabula stritta is somewhat similar to that of the ancient triangular periaktos theatre coulisse, of the modern day Trivision billboard, and of lenticular printing.

== Terminology ==
The Latin term tabula scalata was introduced in 1646 by Athanasius Kircher and can be roughly translated as "staircase-shaped picture".

The terminology in the English language has been somewhat diffuse: many different words have been used for the same type of corrugated pictures. "Perspective picture" and "anamorphic picture" have been common but not very precise terms; these are also used for very different types of pictures. Furthermore, it has been suggested that "anamorphic" should be reserved for the flat type of pictures with a distorted perspective. "Turning pictures" is more precise but less common. The term "double portrait" is not uncommon, but does not cover any tabula scalata that depict different subjects.

== History ==
=== Paleolithic ===
In 1993, Edward Wachtel suggested that by moving a torch, paleolithic cave paintings were animated. The parallel grooves covering certain animal paintings in the La Mouthe cave were not vandalism, but rather, Tabula scalata that showed a different image depending on the angle it was viewed. An ibex with two heads, and a Mammoth with multiple trunks, when lit with only a torch, would show one head or trunk clearly, then fade, to be replaced by another.

=== 16th Century and later ===
An example of anamorphosis appears on Leonardo da Vinci's "Codex Atlanticus" folio 98 (1515). Although the principle isn't necessarily part of tabula scalata, the need for an oblique vantage point is similar and may have inspired the development of a variation that could be viewed from different sides.

The "Zimmern Anamorphosis" on a corrugated panel from circa 1535 (in the collection of Germanisches Nationalmuseum, Nuremberg) shows the portrait of Wilhelm, Count von Zimmern when seen from the left and that of Amalia, Baroness von Zimmern from the right.

Tabula scalata were a popular novelty in England since the late 16th century. References can be found in the works of Shakespeare and in other literature of the time. A turning picture of a young woman (often thought to be Mary, Queen of Scots) with a skull on the other side of the vertical wooden prisms was painted by an unknown artist around 1580. The woman's face and the skull are depicted in the same angle, with the woman's eyes, nose and ears matching the corresponding holes in the skull. The pictures do not completely match: the woman's mouth is much smaller and higher than the skull's upper teeth (the jawbone is missing) and the skull is bigger: the back of the head matches the woman's wide collar.

An illustration of the basic technique, with a single picture hidden from sight by blank sides of slats when viewed from below, was published in a 1583 book on perspective drawing by Giacomo Barozzi da Vignola and Ignazio Danti.

A double portrait of Charles III of Lorraine and his daughter Christine of Lorraine (wife of Ferdinando I de' Medici, Grand Duke of Tuscany) was painted on horizontal wooden prisms by Ludovico Buti in 1593. Christine's portrait was visible via a mirror placed above the painting, while Charles portrait could be seen when looking upwards to the painting located above a door. The painting is now in the collection of the Museo Galileo, Florence.

French Minim mathematician and painter Jean François Niceron described the technique in his 1638 ground-breaking book La perspective curieuse, illustrated with a horizontal version of tabula scalata with a mirror showing the image that was hidden on the top side of the prisms.

More extant double paintings are known from the 17th century. For instance Gaspard Antoine Bois-Clair made some double portraits in 1692, including one of Danish Prince Frederik IV (when viewed from the left) and his sister Sophie Hedevig (when viewed from the right).

Trisceneoramas (with three images) were common at the end of the 19th century as souvenirs for tourists. Many other examples from the time have religious imagery.

On October 23, 1906 Hiram C.J. Deeks was granted US patent 834,048 (application November 25, 1904) for a "Material for printing multiple photographs" that used a similar technique. Photographic paper on cardboard was corrugated with a press to form minute ridges that were then exposed to two different images from two different angles. Under this patent H.C.J. Deeks & Co marketed postcards with changing photographs or drawings, first as Puzzle Post Card later as Photochange Post Card. The pictures in some notable examples would change from a person to a skeleton - depicted in similar position and size. Deeks also marketed a Colorchange Post Card with minute corrugations that had identical pictures on each side, but were sprayed with different "liquid pigment or coloring matter" on (parts of) each side. The process was granted US patent No. 856,519 on June 11, 1907 (application filed September 24, 1906).

The basic principle of tabula scalata later provided the basis for lenticular printing.

== Use on British pound coin ==
The UK Pound Coin introduced in 2017 bears a small embossed image that changes from a "£" symbol to a "1". Described by the Royal Mint as "like a hologram", it is actually a tabula scalata.
