= Hong Kong 3D Museum =

Art museum in Hong Kong

Coordinates: 22.39674°N 113.96970°E

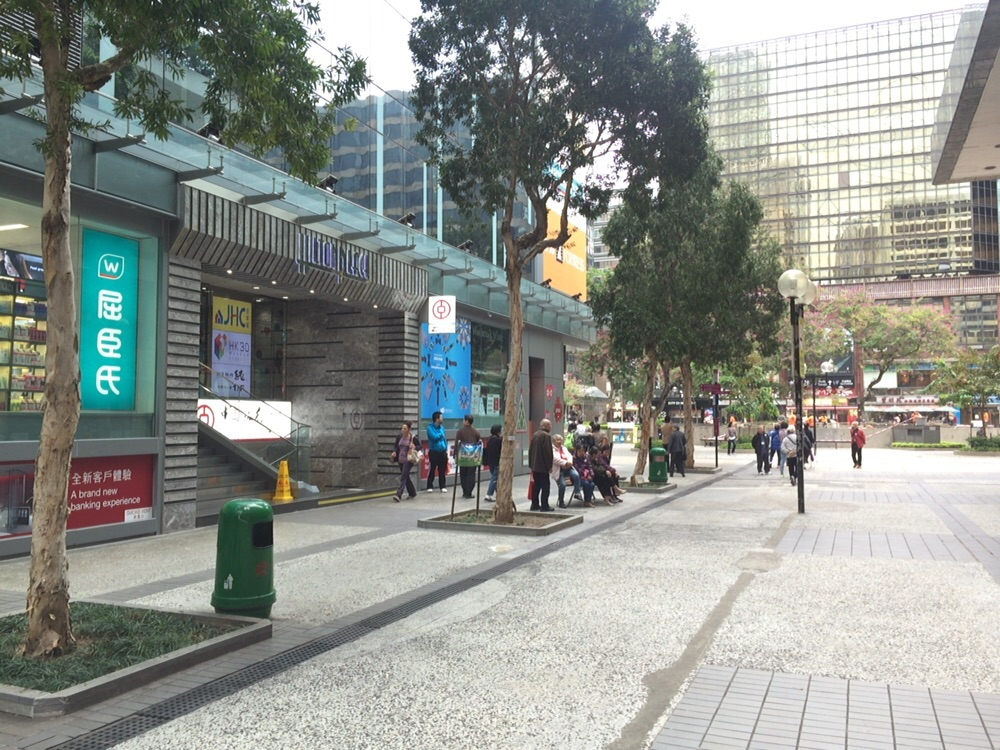
Hong Kong 3D Museum－Outdoor

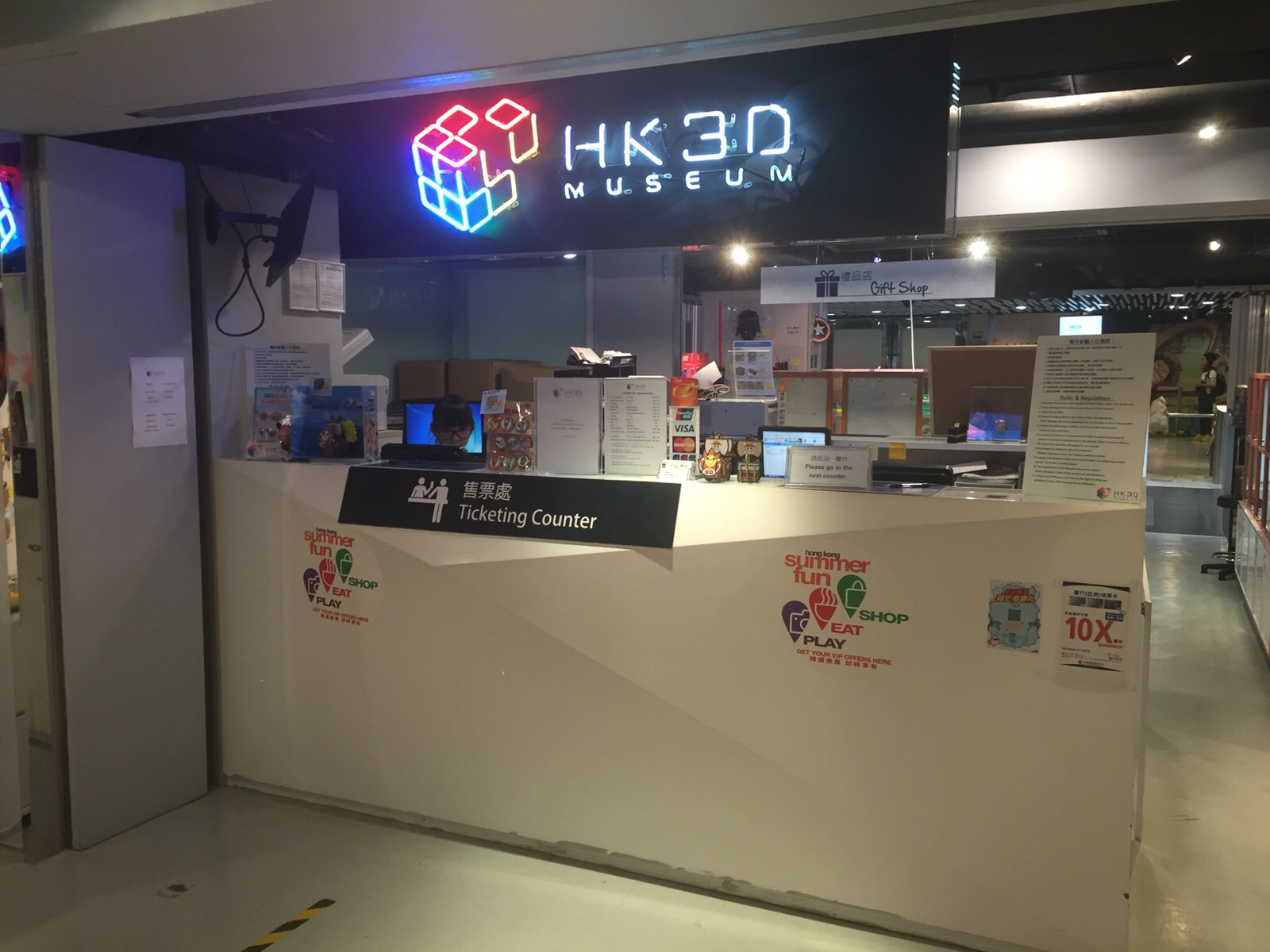
Hong Kong 3D Museum－Ticketing

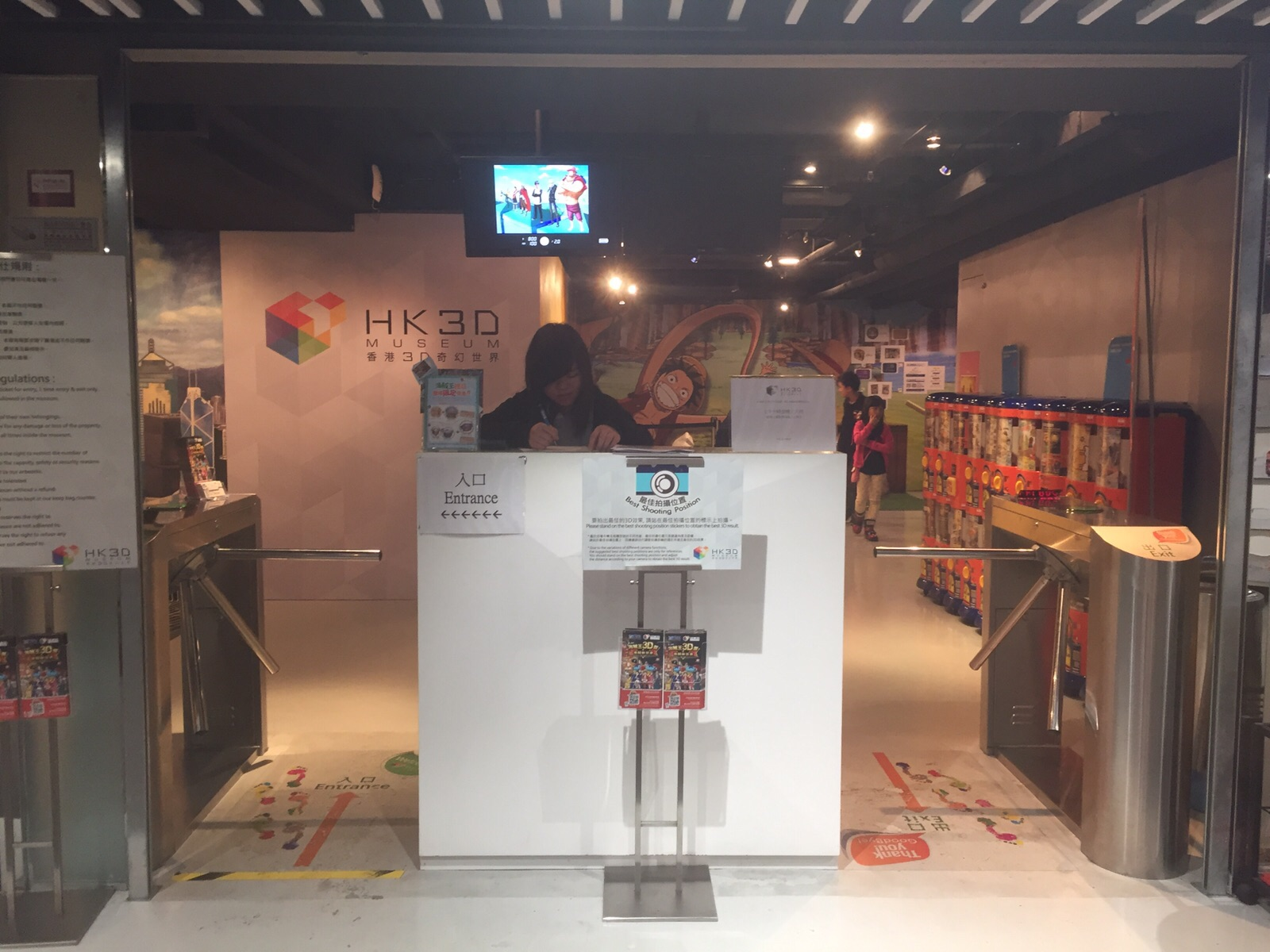
Hong Kong 3D Museum－Entrance

Hong Kong 3D Museum (Chinese: 香港3D奇幻世界) is a privately owned art museum on Granville Road, Hong Kong. Specializing in trompe-l'œil, it opened on 7 July 2014. It features art created by local artists that focuses on local culture and views of the city, and provides instructions to help visitors view and photograph the optical illusions. It was inspired by the Trickeye Museum in Seoul and similar museums in other Asian countries.

In April 2015, it hosted the first 3D exhibition on the manga series One Piece, which was criticized as prone to continuity errors but otherwise well received. In May 2015, a subsidiary gallery of the museum was opened in Ponte 16, Macau.
