= Arthur Mole =

American photographer 1889-1983

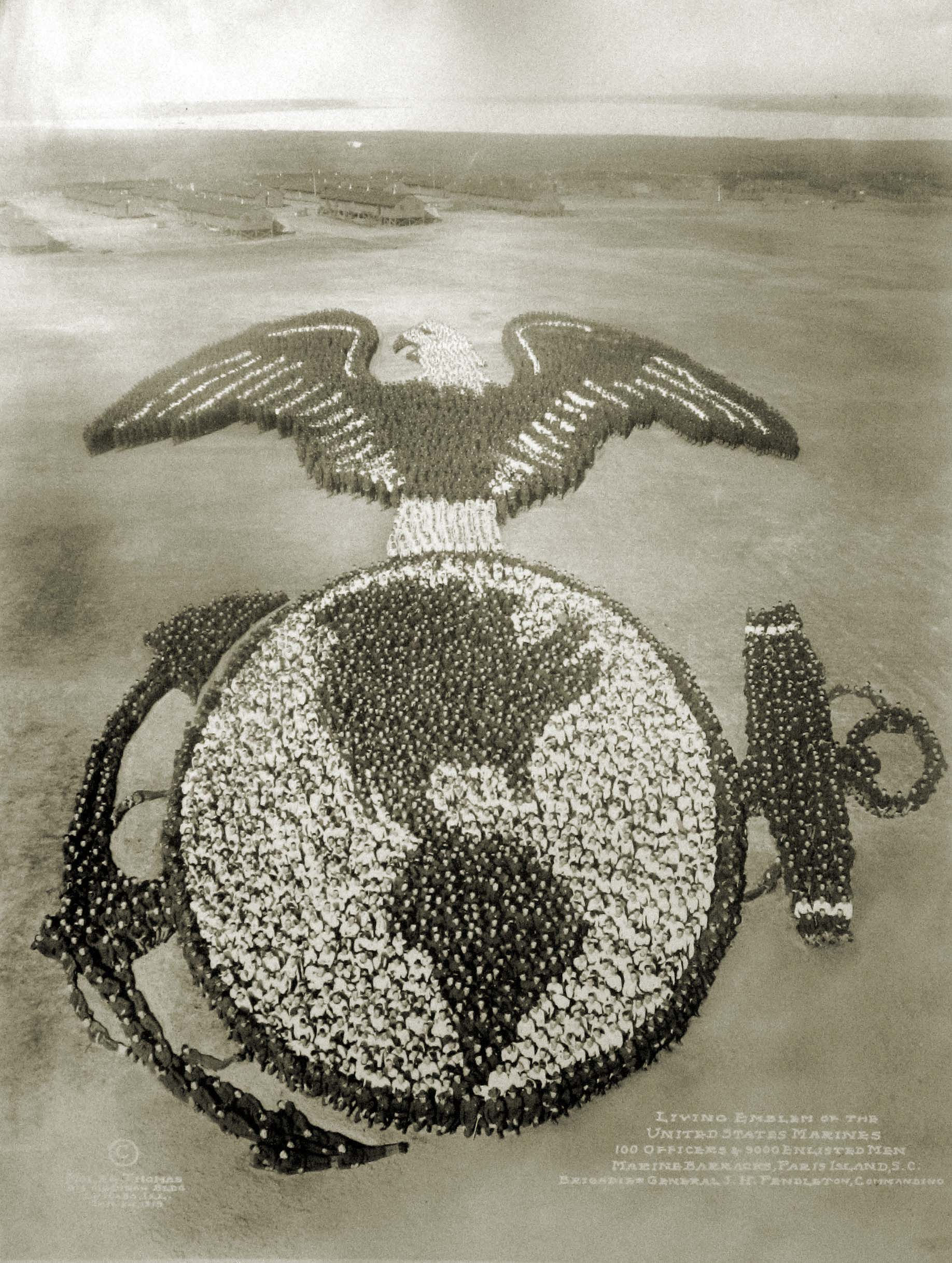
"Living Emblem of the United States Marines". Mole & Thomas, 1919

Arthur Samuel Mole (January 7, 1889 in Lexden, Essex, England – 14 August 1983 in Fort Lauderdale, Florida, US) was a British-born, naturalized American commercial photographer. He became famous for a series of "living photographs" made during World War I, in which tens of thousands of soldiers, reservists and other members of the military were arranged to form massive compositions. Although if viewed from the ground or from directly above, these masses of men would appear meaningless, when seen from the top of an 80-foot viewing tower, they clearly appeared to be various patriotic shapes (via anamorphosis). The key was to photograph the people from the one place where the lines of perspective would resolve themselves into intelligible images. His partner in this endeavor was John D. Thomas.

== Living photographs ==
Mole immigrated to the United States with his family in 1903, when he was 14 years old. He worked as a commercial photographer in Zion, Illinois, north of Chicago. During World War I, he traveled to various Army, Marine and Navy camps to execute his massive compositions. He is considered a pioneer in the field of performed group photography. Executing photographs using such large numbers, and relying on lines of perspective stretching out more than a hundred meters, required a week of preparation and then hours to actually position the formations. Mole would stand on his viewing tower and shout into a megaphone or use a long pole with a white flag to arrange the tens of thousands of soldiers into position.

Ten images are most famous from this period. They include images of Woodrow Wilson, the Liberty Bell, Statue of Liberty, the American Eagle as well as emblems of the YMCA and the Allied flags. The Human U.S. Shield required the placement of 30,000 people; The Liberty Bell 25,000.

Mole's work is featured in the collections of the Chicago Historical Society, Metropolitan Museum of Art, San Francisco Museum of Modern Art, and the Library of Congress. The photographs were again presented to the public in the July 2007 issue of Martha Stewart Living. Eight of the images are displayed in a feature article.

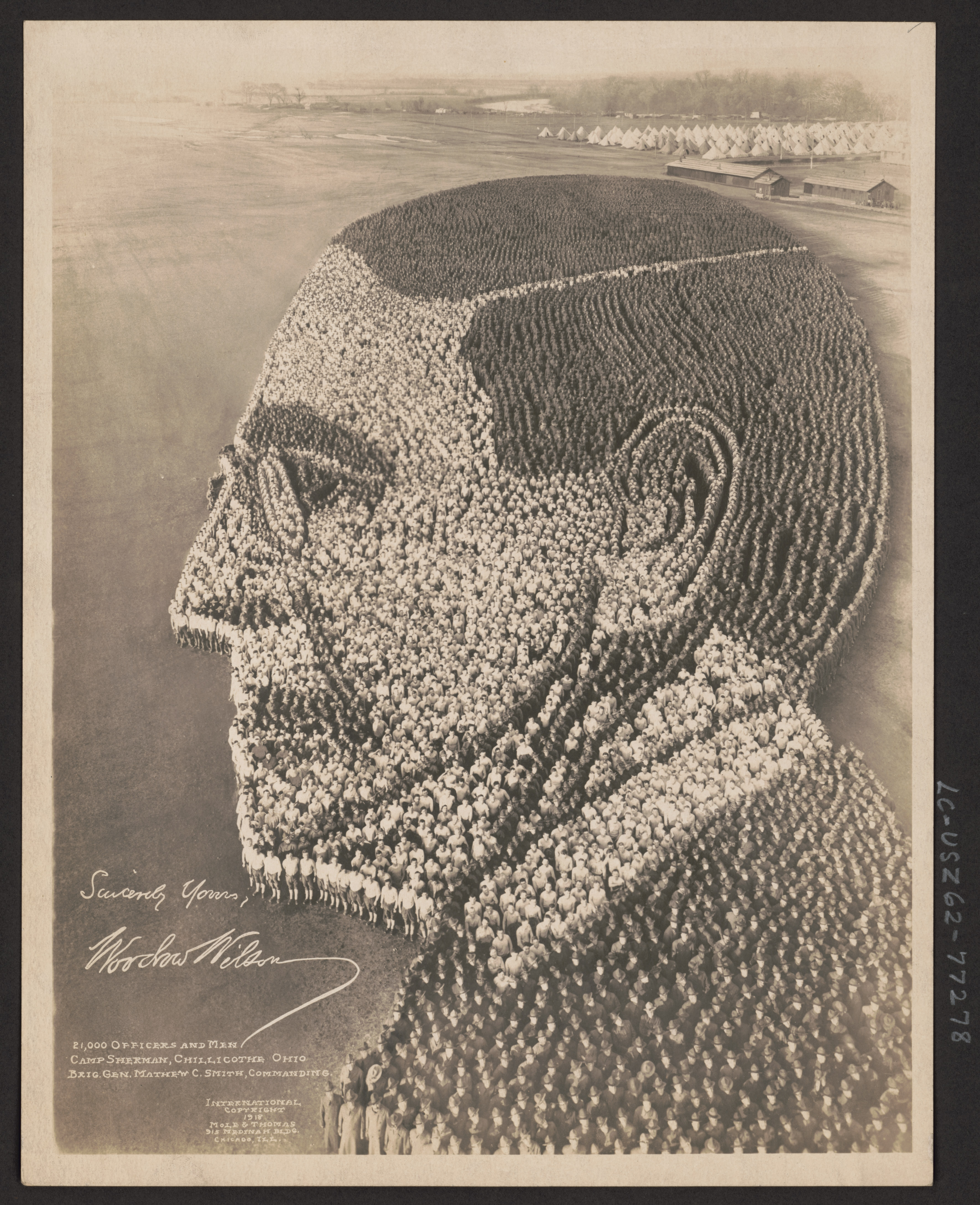
"Woodrow Wilson", 21,000 people

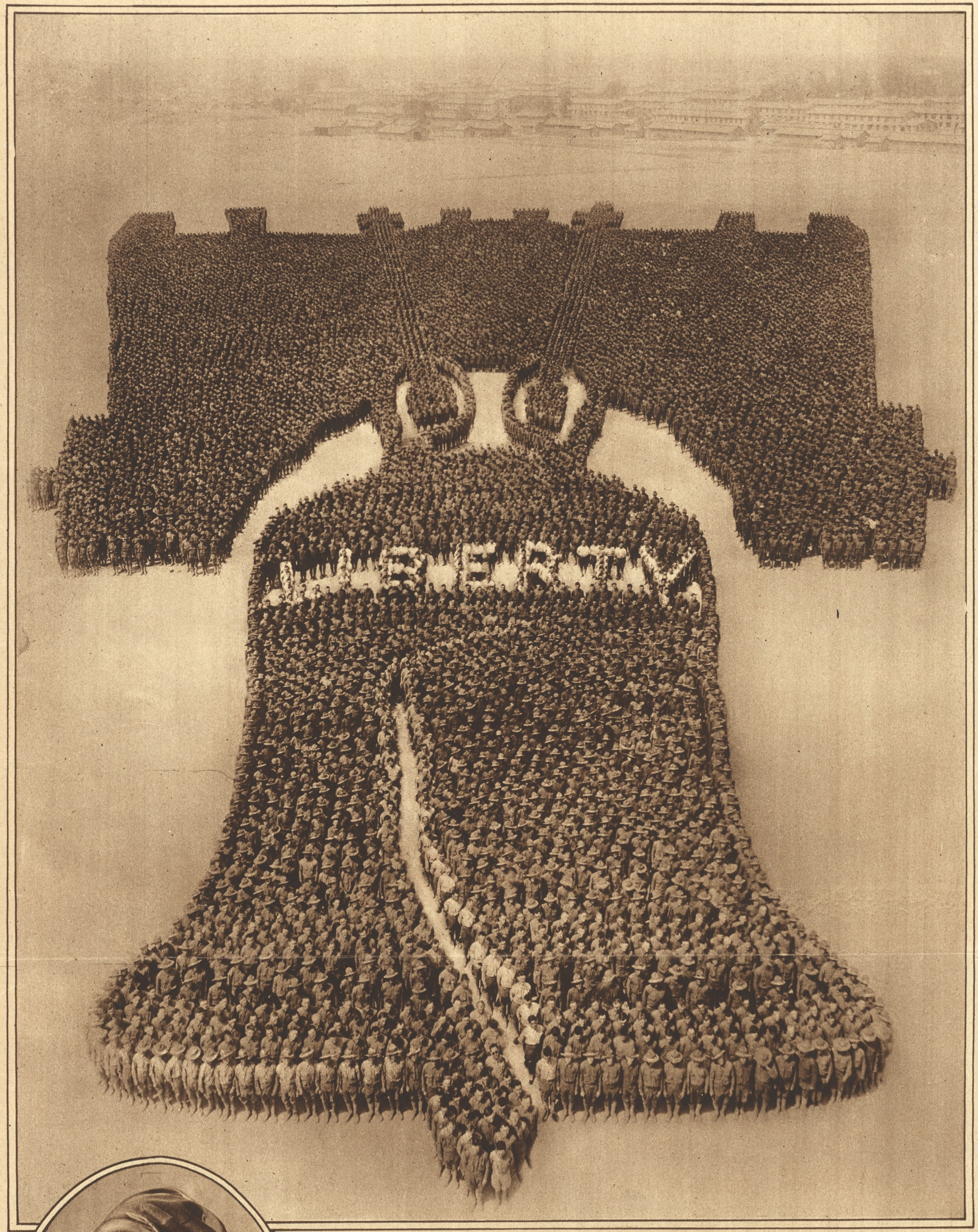
"The Human Liberty Bell", 25,000 people

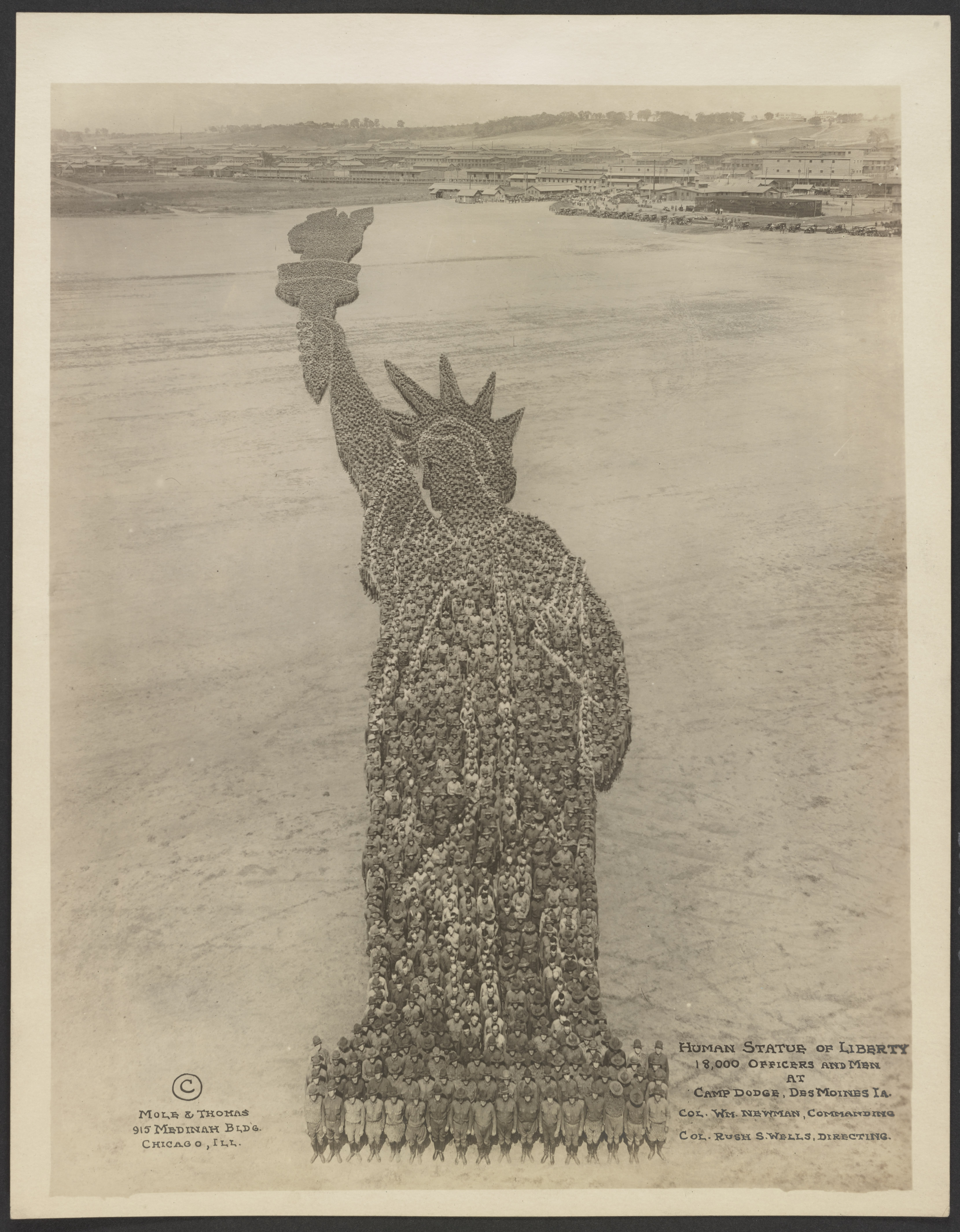
"Human Statue of Liberty", 18,000 people

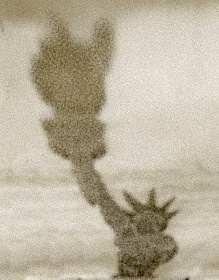
Approximation of "The Human Statue of Liberty" from directly above without anamorphosis

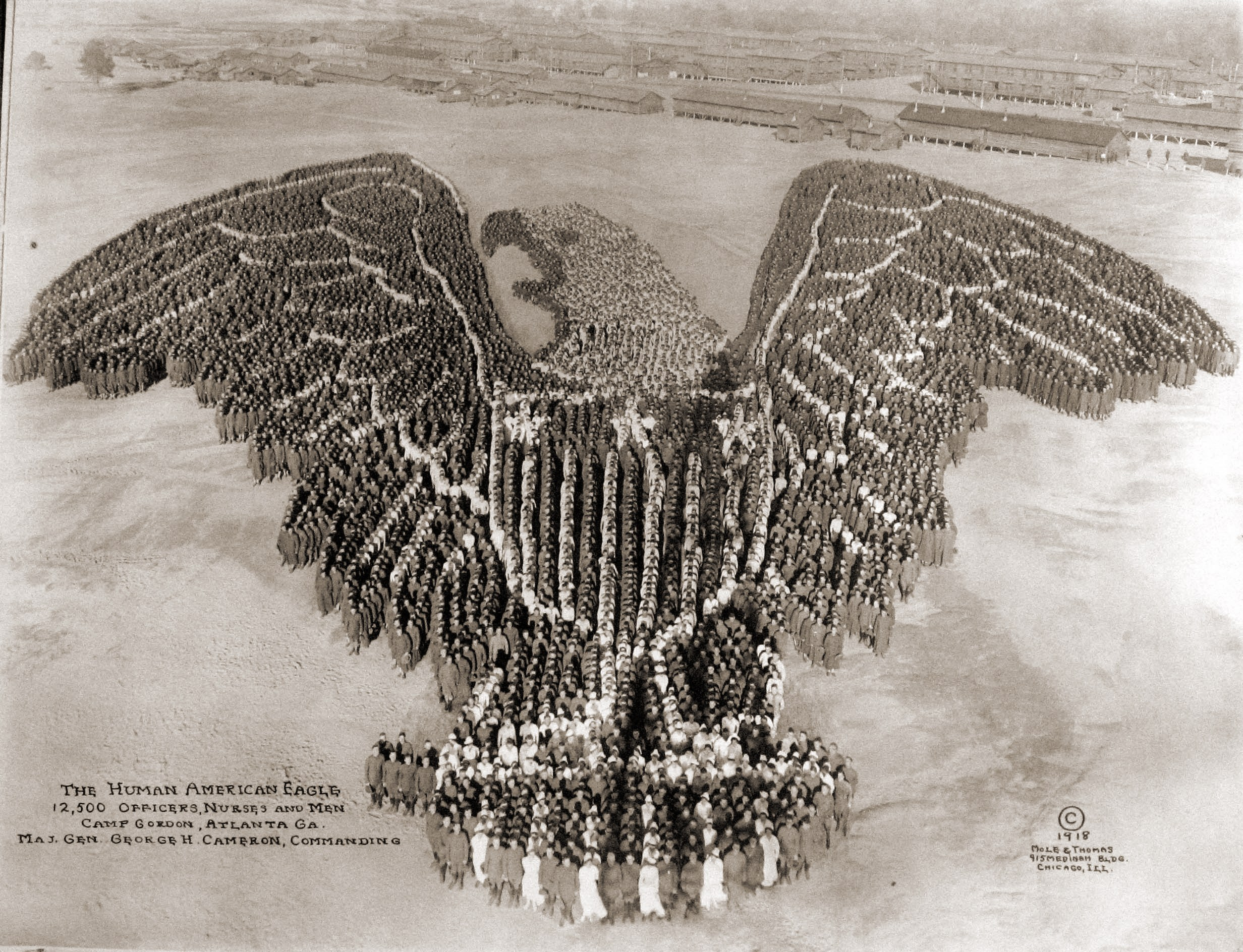
"The Human American Eagle", 12,500 people

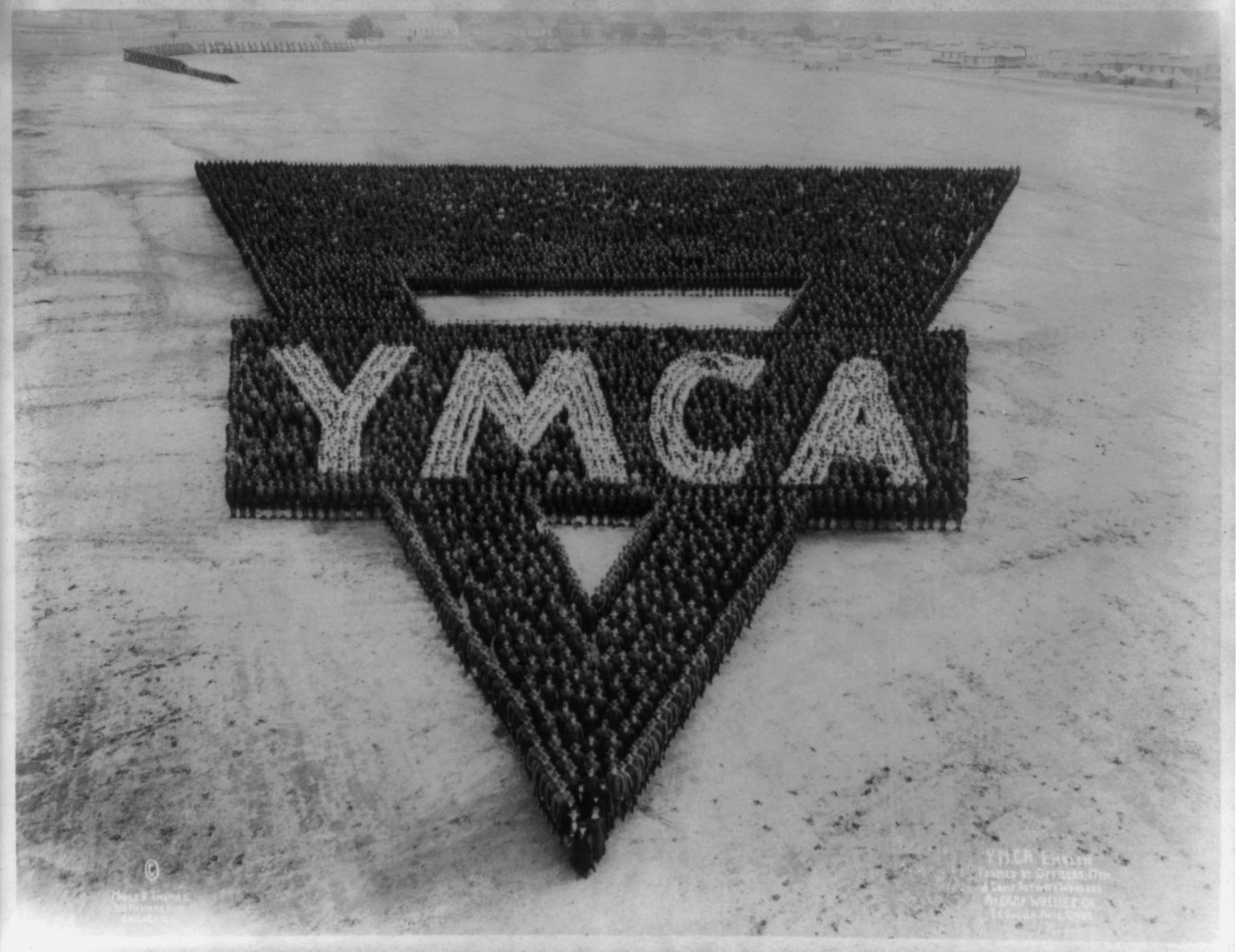
YMCA emblem

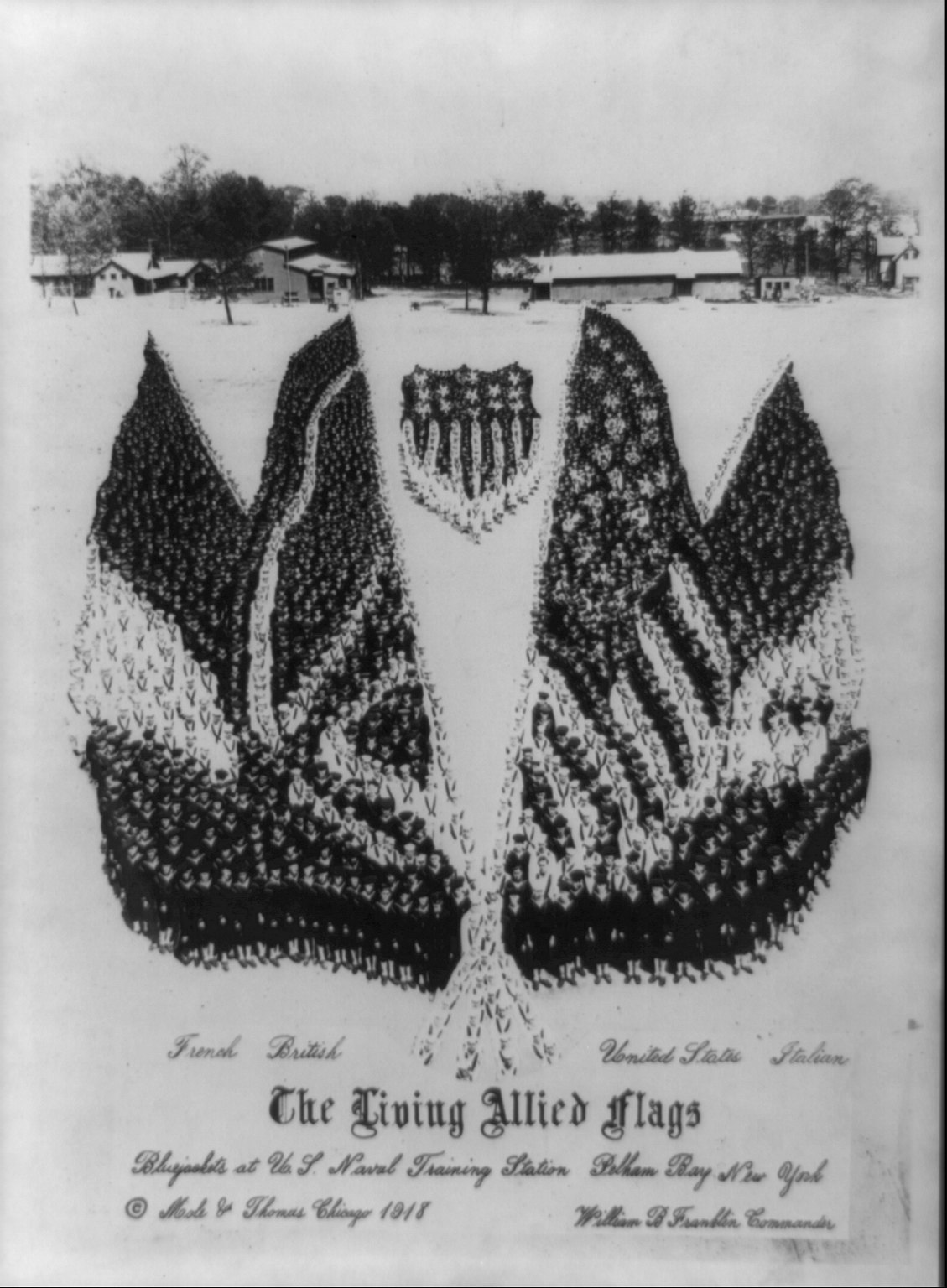
"The Living Allied Flags"

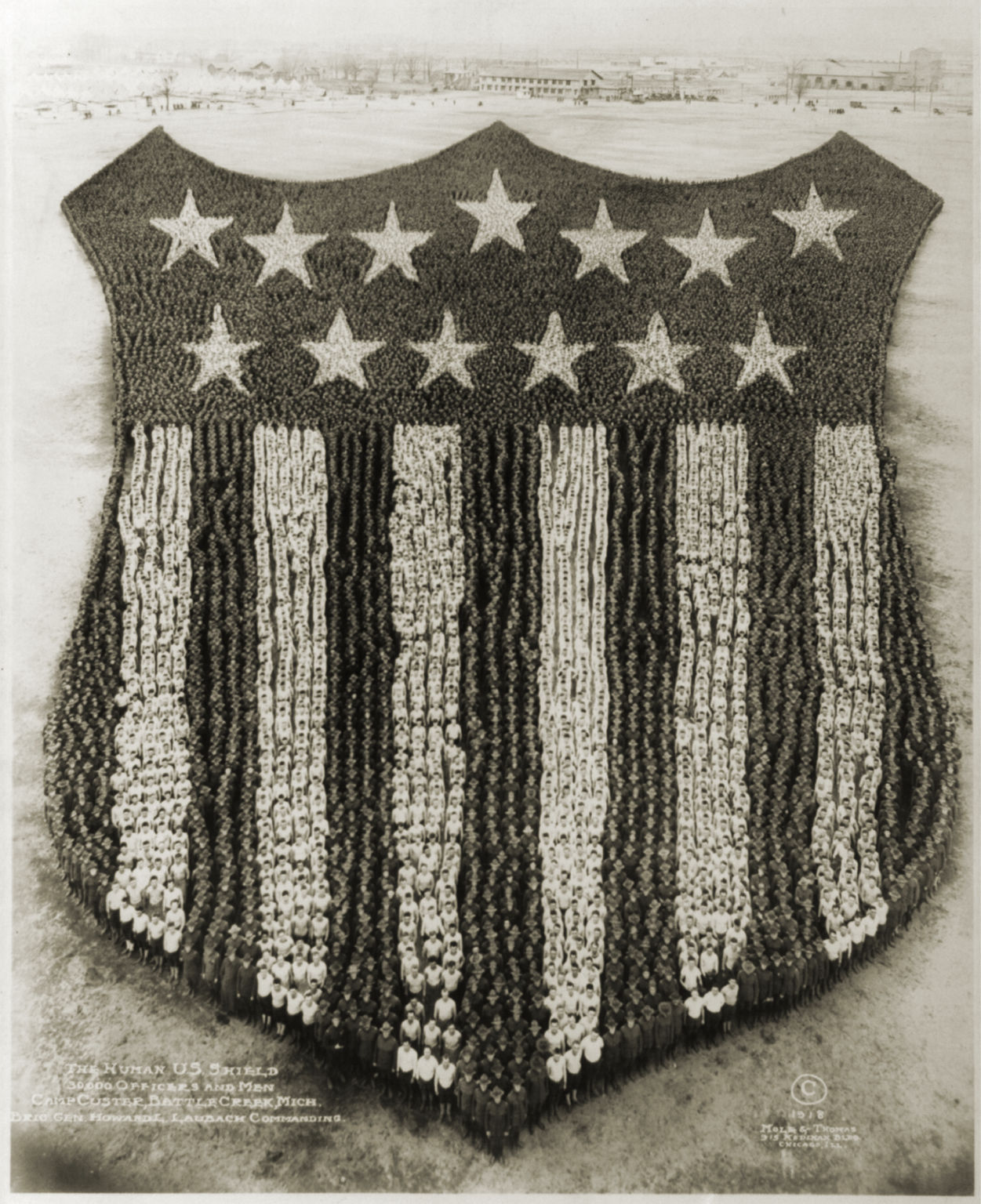
"The Human US Shield", 30,000 people

== Post war ==
As demand for these types of photos dried up Mole returned to his photography studio in Zion, Illinois. According to Karen Schmitt, the Mole & Thomas company donated the profits of their photos to "the returning soldiers and to this country's efforts to re-build their lives."

== See also ==
His technique lives on in a contemporary military public relations context.

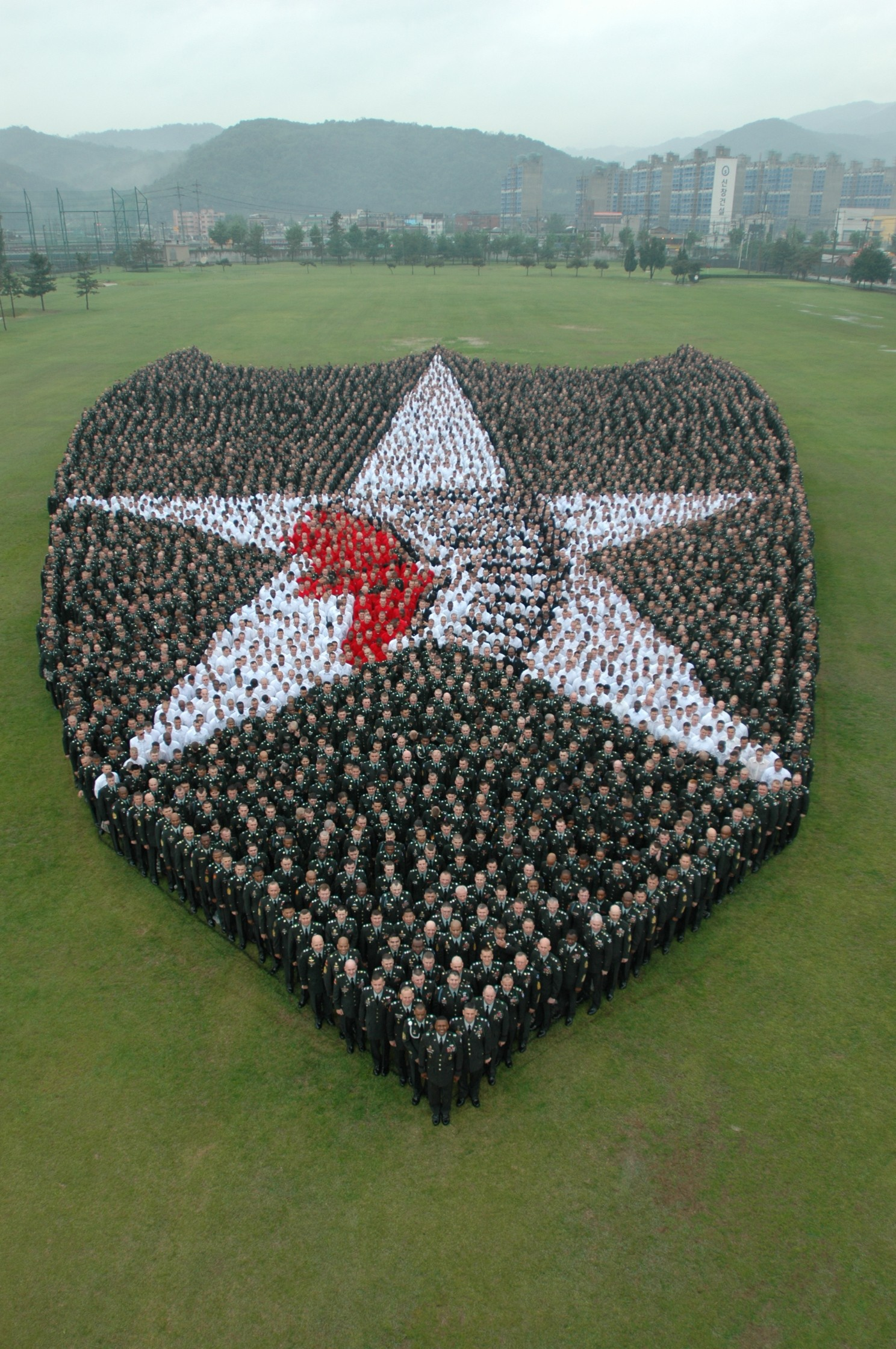
Approximately 5,000 soldiers from the 2nd Infantry Division create a human version of the division's distinctive Indianhead patch at Indianhead Stage Field on Camp Casey, Korea, 2009

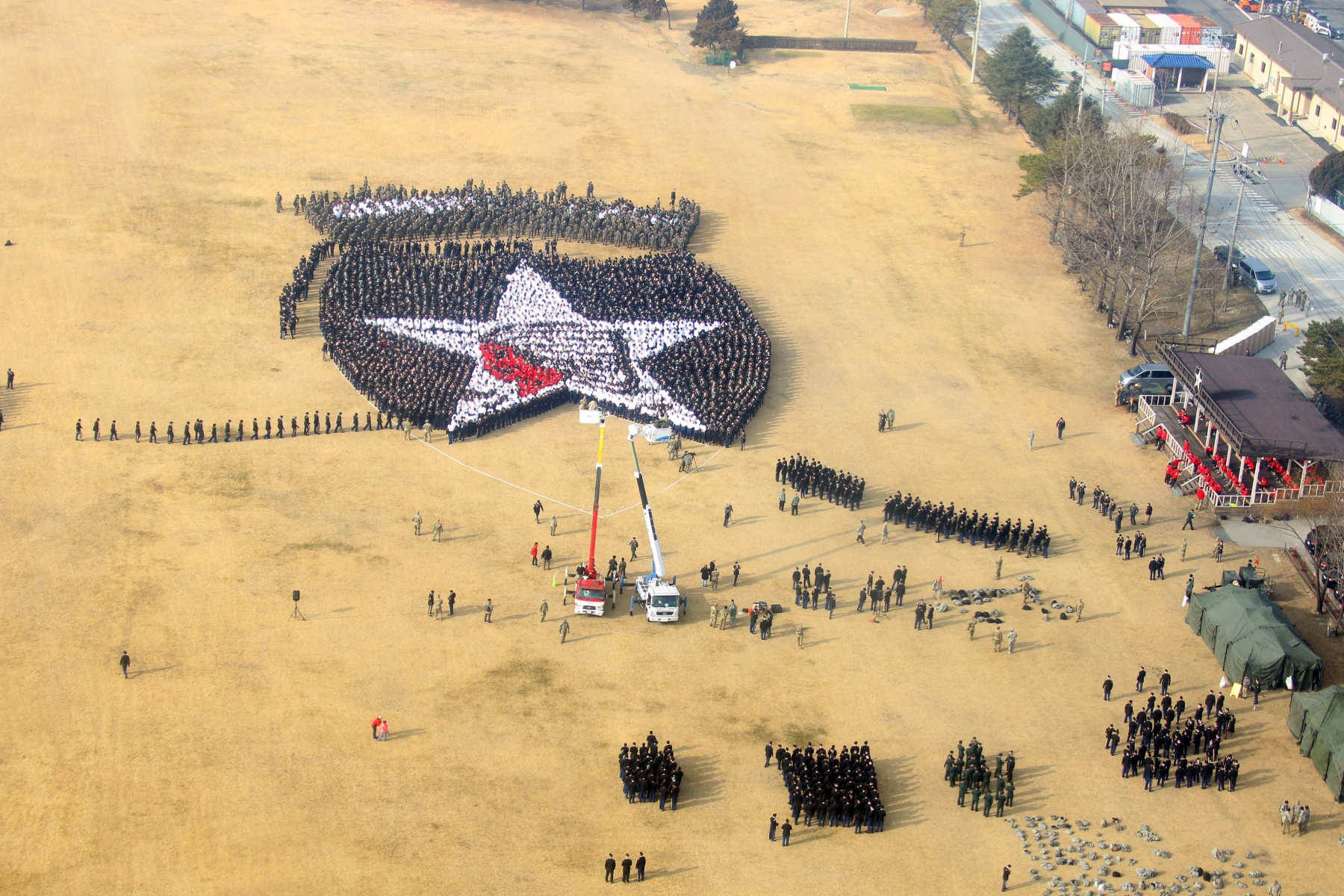
Organising the construction of a living image, 2nd Infantry Division, 2016

== Bibliography ==
Notes

References

- Kaplan, Louis (2001). "A Patriotic Mole: A Living Photograph". CR: The New Centennial Review. 1: 107–139. ISSN 1532-687X. OCLC 809576000.
- Mikkelson, David (2022). "Human Statue of Liberty". Snopes.
- Moss, Stephen (August 24, 2015). "Patriot frames: the power of Arthur Mole's military 'living photographs'". The Guardian.
- Schmitt, Karen (April 2008). "Patriotic Poses: "Living Photographs" from Mole & Thomas". Defense Transportation Journal. 64 (2): 12–14. ISSN 0011-7625. OCLC 3662854.

RVB Books published a book of Mole photos in 2015 ISBN 979-1090306271

== Other sources ==
- Jensen, Oliver. America's Yesterdays—Images of Our Lost Past Discovered in the Photographic Archives of The Library of Congress. New York: American Heritage Publishing Co., Inc., 1978, pp. 248–49.
- "Arthur S. Mole." The Heartland Project: Illusions of Eden. (18 March 2003).
- Collins, Dan. "Anamorphosis and the Eccentric Observer (Parts 1 and 2)." Leonardo Vol. 25, No. 1 and 2, 1992. Arizona State University. (18 March 2003). Full text
