= Trickeye Museum =

South Korean gallery franchise

Trickeye Museum (Korean: 트릭아이미술관) is a gallery franchise with big wall paintings or installations, which contain AR (augmented reality) effect and/or 3D illusions. The company owner of the Trickeye Museum has developed special camera application in order to see landed AR effect.

== History ==
The first Trickeye Museum was open in Seoul, South Korea in 2010. In 2012 the second museum was open in Busan. In 2013 Seoul Trickeye Museum was added with Ice museum and Love museum. The same year 3rd Trickeye Museum was open in Jeju. In 2014 at the same year first two franchises were open outside South Korea: Hong Kong and Singapore. In 2016 one more museum with Retro theme was open in Yangpyeong, South Korea.

In 2017 all the existing Trickeye Museums (except Yangpyeong) had implemented AR (augmented reality) technology. To use AR the new application Trickeye app was released.

== Attraction ==
The Trickeye Museum in Seoul now contains 65 artworks, 10 before the paid entrance and 55 inside. Among the ones that inside, 40 are with AR effect and 15 artworks (either installations or wall pictures) without AR. In addition to main museum gallery, there is an Ice Museum (where everything is made out of ice) and VR entertainment zone. Moreover, as a part of Trickeye Museum complex in Seoul there is a Love Museum, located in the same building.

== Branch network ==
There are 4 Trickeye Museums in South Korea: Seoul, Busan, Jeju, and Yangpyeong. There is one Trickeye Museum in Hong-Kong (in process of renovation), and one in Singapore.

== Awards ==
In 2014 Trickeye Museum Seoul had been awarded with the 1st place among Seoul Tourist attraction in the category of museums by American travel website Tripadvisor.
