= Jacobus Plasschaert =

Flemish painter and teacher

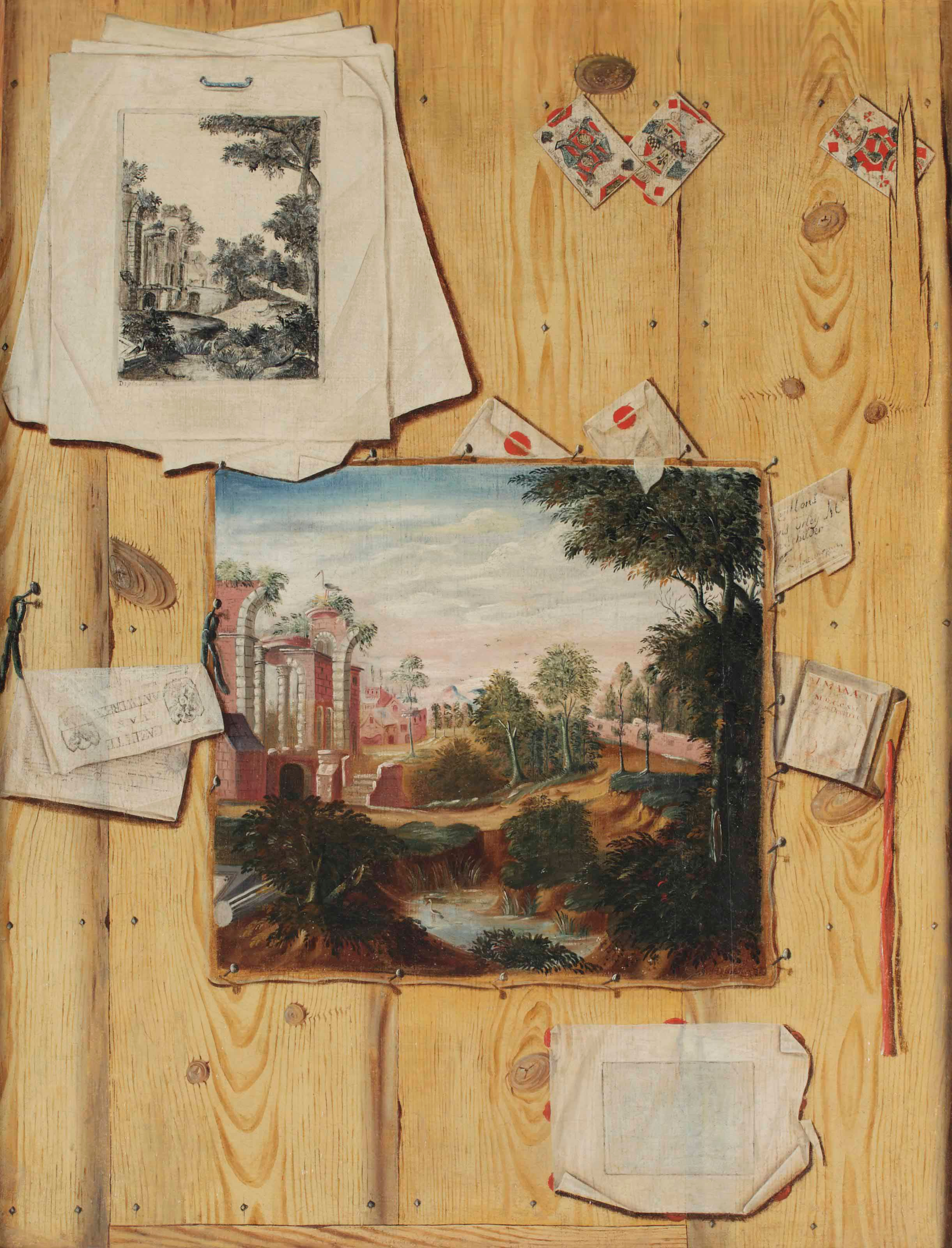
Trompe-l'œil with a painted canvas and print of a landscape capriccio

Jacobus Plasschaert or Jacob Plasschaert, spelling variation of name Plasgaert (c. 1689 – 21 November 1765 in Bruges) was a Flemish painter and teacher. He is known for his trompe-l'œil still lifes and vanitas still lifes. He was active in Bruges.

== Life ==
Jacobus Plasschaert was born around 1689 in an unknown location. When he registered with the guild of painters of Bruges on 6 April 1739, he had to pay ten pounds as a non-citizen of Bruges. The fact that he was a native from a place other than Bruges is also mentioned in another document. His year of birth has been deduced from his death notice in the death registers of St Anne's parish in Bruges. It states that when he died on 21 November 1765, he had reached the age of 76.

Plasschaert married Maria Anna Dewolf (De Wulf) on 9 September 1721. Through his marriage he acquired the citizenship (poorterschap) of Bruges. The couple had at least eight children, four of whom died prematurely. He became qualified as a schoolmaster and was registered in the Bruges guild of librarians and schoolmasters in early 1722. As he had few pupils, he was not very busy and started to paint, an art form in which he became proficient. He likely continued to teach.

The family Plasschaert-Dewolf often suffered financial difficulties and regularly had to move homes as they were unable to pay the rent. On 24 January 1744, the dean of the guild of librarians and schoolmasters instructed the police to prosecute Plasschaert because he had failed to pay his overdue membership fees.

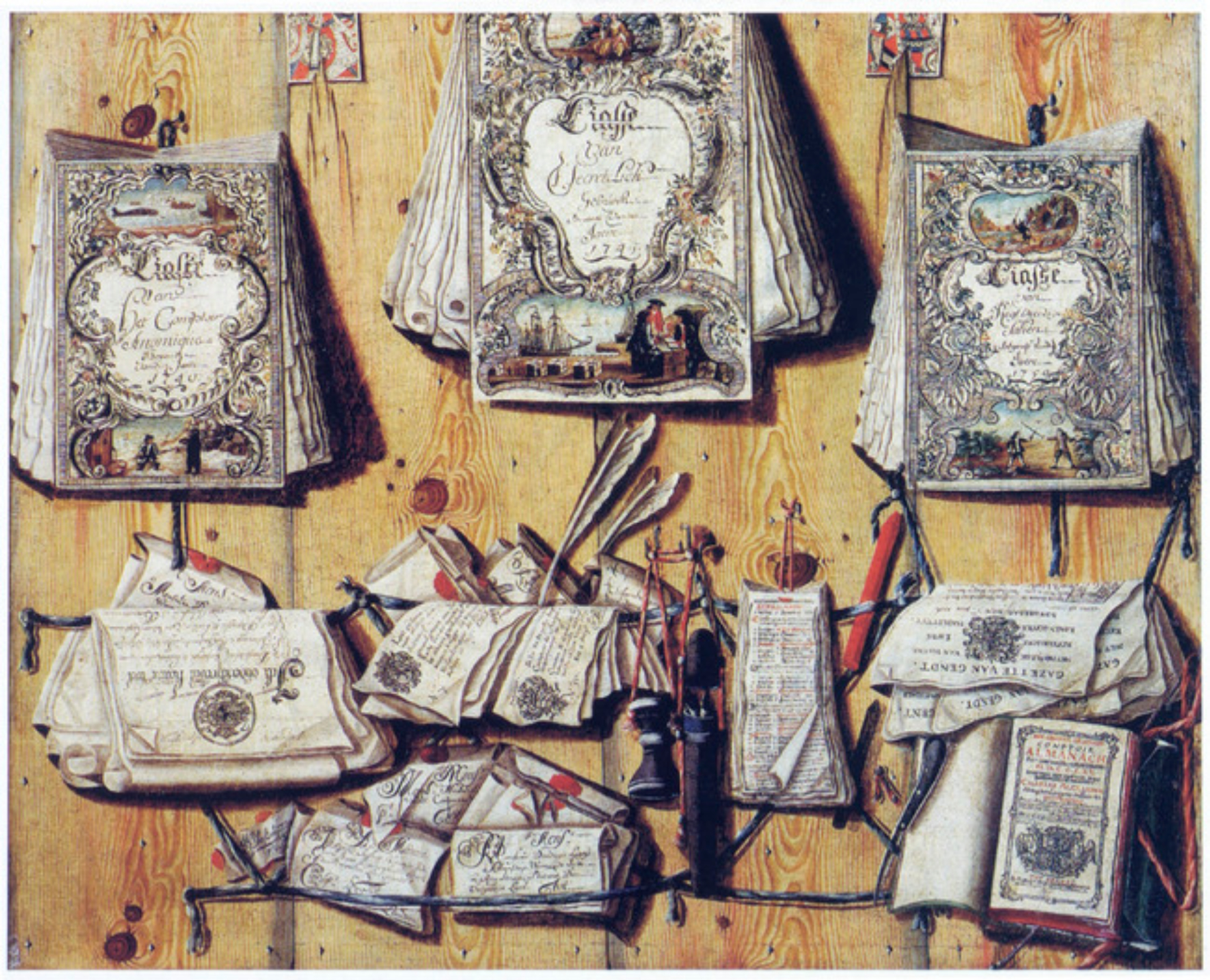
Trompe-l'œil of documents and an almanac hung on a wooden partition

He died on 21 November 1765 and was buried in the cemetery at St Anne's Church in Bruges.

== Work ==
The known oeuvre of Plasschaert is rather small. Four signed still lifes are identified while a handful of other works have been attributed to him. His signature is typically painted in calligraphic lettering which gives it the appearance of being part of the other writing often depicted in the compositions.

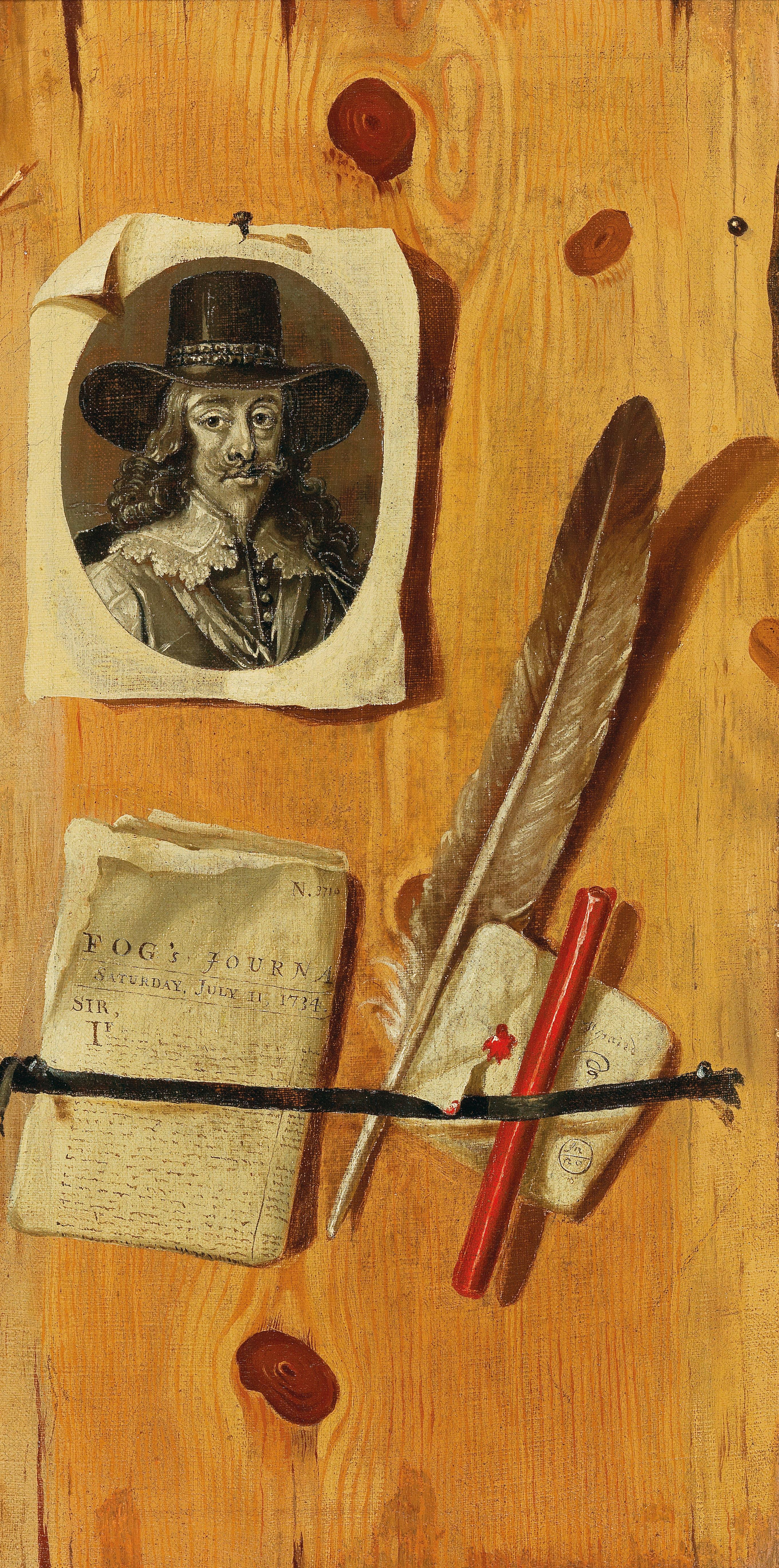
Trompe-l'œil painting with an engraved portrait of King Charles I

All preserved canvases are illusionistically painted still lifes depicting all kinds of paperwork, books and engravings stuck to a surface. They mainly show letter boards with an intriguing collection of letters, documents and other printed matter. The depicted strips of paper, receipts, letters and engraved landscapes look as if they are fixed to the board with nails, hung up with a cord or stuck behind stretched ribbons in the inside of a wooden box. The colored ribbons are pinned vertically and horizontally like a tight chessboard pattern on the yellow-brown background formed by the wooden planks. The ribbons provide structure to the composition, which ostensible tries to give the impression that the objects were stuck on the board in a random manner. The papers are in reality carefully arranged: folded, stitched like a rose or curled up and sometimes with a donkey ear that enhances the illusionistic effect. Sometimes a splinter sticks out from the board behind which a document is pinned to it. Plasschaert paints the grain and knots in the wood and the nails by which the wooden boards are attached to each other in detail.

Curled-up sheets, shadow effects and deliberately placed nails enhance the illusionistic effect. In some works a letter appears to have been recently torn open or a red seal freshly broken. The naturalism is further expressed by the seals stamped in red or dark green lacquer and the stretched ribbons in the form of a grid, behind which the objects are stuck. Writing utensils such as goose feathers and matching leather tubes, inkwells, penknifes, playing cards with figurative representations and bars of sealing wax are also depicted. The works contain a collection of random objects and for this reason such compositions are referred to in art history as quodlibet paintings. The Latin word 'quodlibet' means 'what you like'.

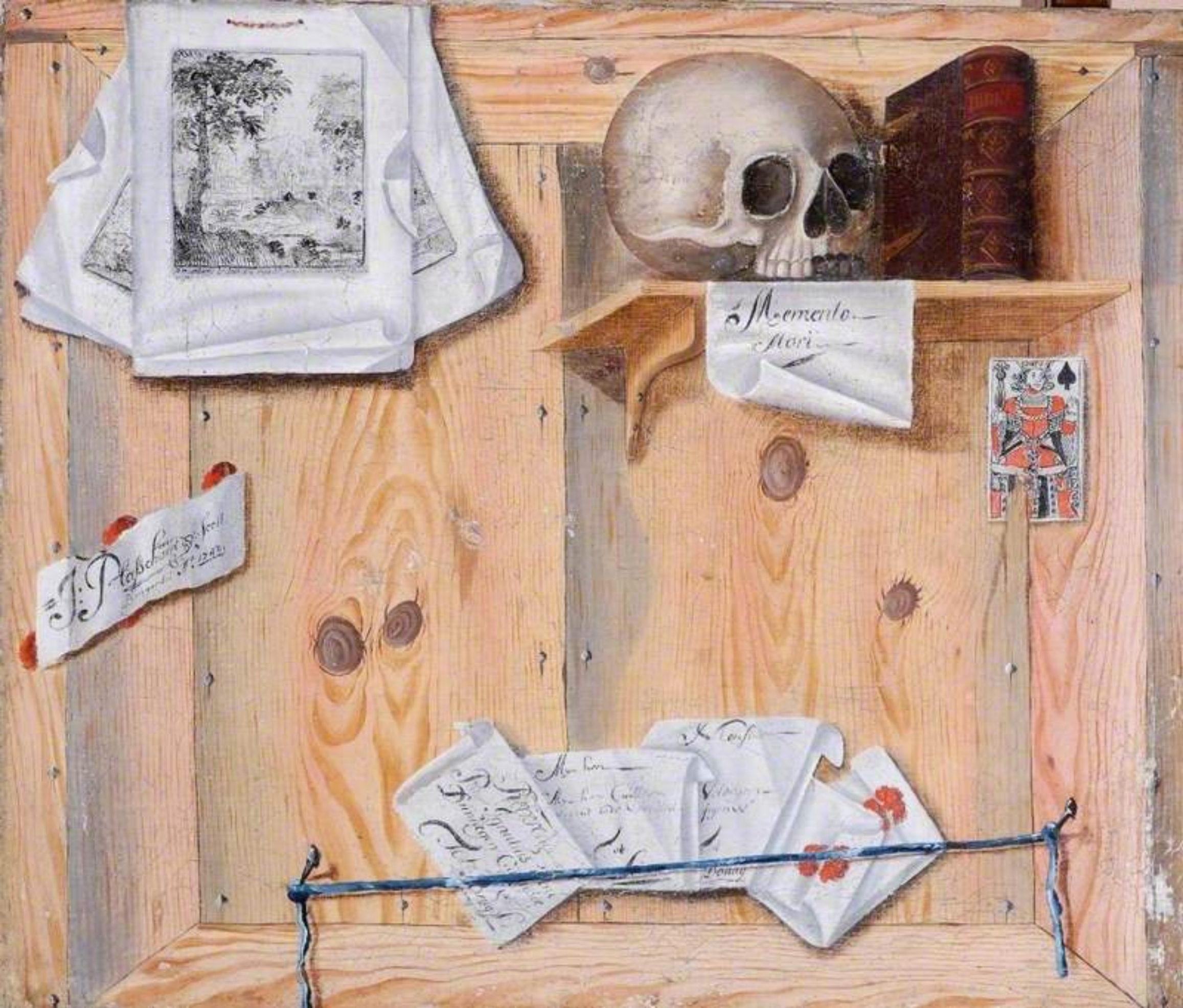
Trompe-l'œil still life with a skull

These works are somewhat reminiscent of the trompe-l'œil still lifes of the Netherlandish masters of the 17th century such as Cornelis Norbertus Gysbrechts, Franciscus Gijsbrechts and Godfriedt van Bochoutt. It is not entirely clear how Plasschaert became interested in the trompe-l'œil genre. The work of Cornelis Norbertus Gysbrechts, who was active in the third quarter of the 17th century, seems in particular to have been inspirational for Plasschaert's own output although Gysbrechts' paintings were likely not readily available in Bruges since Gysbrechts worked outside of the Southern Netherlands for most of his career. Godfriedt van Bochoutt, on the other hand, was a fellow citizen of Bruges whose works would have been present in Plasschaert's hometown.

Some of his works clearly have a vanitas meaning. The genre of vanitas still lifes offers a reflection on the meaninglessness of earthly life and the transient nature of earthly goods and endeavors. This meaning is conveyed in these still lifes through the use of stock symbols, which reference the transience of things and, in particular, the futility of earthly wealth: a skull, soap bubbles, candles, empty glasses, wilting flowers, insects, smoke, watches, mirrors, books, hourglasses and musical instruments, various expensive or exclusive objects such as jewellery and rare shells. In the Trompe-l'œil still life with a skull the vanitas meaning is expressed by the presence of the skull and the words memento mori (Latin 'remember that you [have to] die') below it. The portrait of King Charles I of England, who fell from power and was executed, in the Trompe-l'œil painting with an engraved portrait of King Charles I is an often used symbol in vanitas paintings to express the precariousness of worldly status and position.
