= Pieter van der Willigen =

Flemish painter (1634–1694)

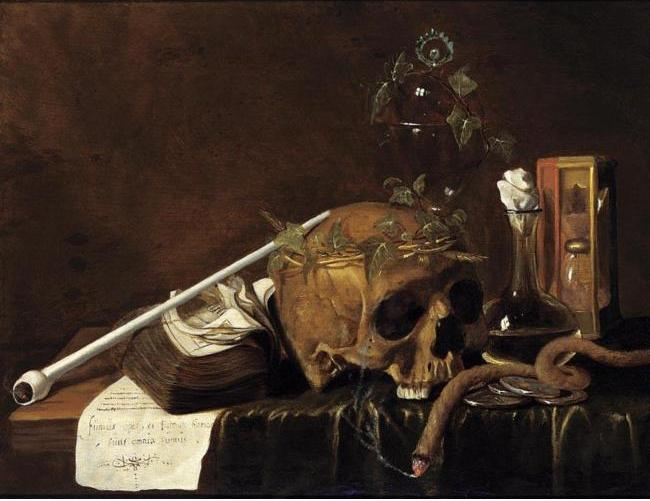
Still Life with skull, book, pipe, carafe, and hourglass.

Pieter van der Willigen (17 December 1634 – 8 June 1694) was a Flemish Baroque painter.

== Biography ==
According to Cornelis de Bie, he was born in Bergen op Zoom and was a good still-life painter. According to the RKD, he became a pupil of Thomas Willeboirts Bosschaert in 1652, was a member of the Guild of St. Luke from 1655 to 1669, and became poorter in Antwerp in 1661. He is known as a still-life painter who influenced David Bailly. In 1662 his brother Jan van der Willigen was his pupil. He died in Antwerp.

Many paintings formerly attributed to him have been re-attributed to Hendrick Andriessen, especially those with a wreath of straw on top of a skull. Today very few works remain that can be attributed to him, though De Bie wrote a page-long poem about his "still" paintings, and Houbraken also included a poem about his still-life paintings from another source.
