= The Reverse of a Framed Painting =

Painting by Cornelis Norbertus Gysbrechts

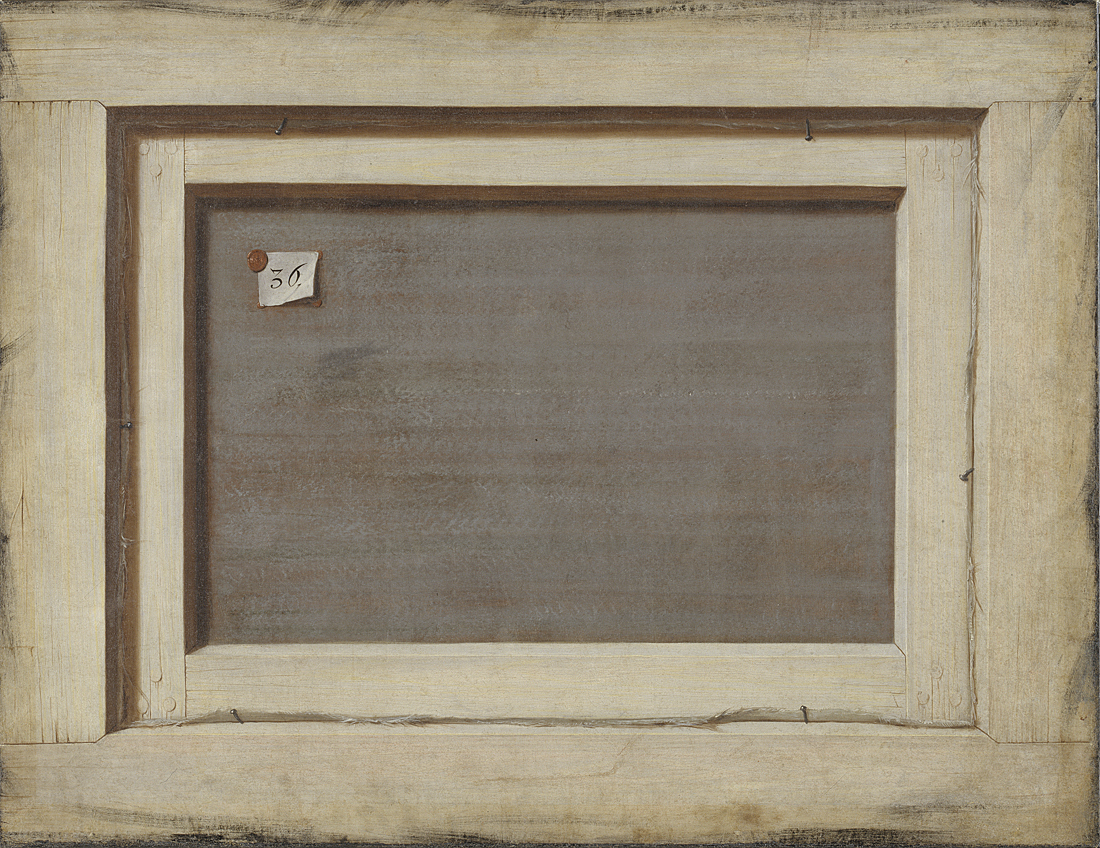
- Artist: Cornelius Norbertus Gysbrechts
- Year: 1670
- Medium: Oil on canvas
- Dimensions: 66.4 cm × 87 cm (26.1 in × 34 in)
- Location: Statens Museum for Kunst

The Reverse of a Framed Painting (Danish: Bagsiden af et indrammet maleri) is a still life trompe-l'œil painting by Flemish painter Cornelius Norbertus Gysbrechts. Made in 1670, when Gysbrechts worked as the official painter of the Danish royal court, the painting is considered a masterpiece of trompe-l'œil painting for its deceptively sculptural representation of the back of a framed canvas.

The work has been called "the most radical meditation about painting as an object and as an image," and is considered an early example of conceptual art.

== History ==
The first bibliographic reference mentioning the existence of the painting was the inventory of 1 August 1674 of the Kunstkammer of the royal family of Denmark, during the reign of Christian V of Denmark, although it is believed that this was a commission of the former king, Frederick III of Denmark, since he had interest in collectionism and, especially, in Flemish painting, which could have led him to hire Cornelius Gysbrechts for the position of royal court painter.

== Technique ==
The original approach of the trompe-l'œil technique on the work, at the time, allowed the viewer to see it as an object of curiosity, suitable to be shown in a Kunstkammer, such as the intention of the painter. In order to reinforce its illusion, the painting was supposedly exhibited leaning on the entrance hall of the Royal Danish Kunstkammer, suggesting the idea that the painting was just a frame, yet to be hung up. Even today, the painting is exhibited in this way at the Statens Museum for Kunst.

== See also ==
- The Treachery of Images

== Bibliography ==
- Stoichiţă, Victor I. The self-aware image: an insight into early modern meta-painting. Cambridge University Press, 1997.
- Hein, Jorgen and Peter Kristiansen. Rosenborg Castle: a guide to the Danish collection. Copenhagen: Rosenborg, 1999.
- Schifferer, Sybille Ebert. Deceptions and Illusions: Five Centuries of Trompe L'Oeil Painting. London: Lund Humphries, 2003.
- Anderberg, Brigitte [et al.]. SMK Highlights: Statens Museum for Kunst. Copenhagen: Statens Museum for Kunst, 2008.
