= The Treachery of Images =

1929 painting by René Magritte

- Artist: René Magritte
- Year: 1929
- Medium: Oil on canvas
- Dimensions: 60.33 cm × 81.12 cm (23.75 in × 31.94 in)
- Location: Los Angeles County Museum of Art, Los Angeles

The Treachery of Images (French: La Trahison des images) is a 1929 painting by Belgian surrealist painter René Magritte. It is also known as This Is Not a Pipe, Ceci n'est pas une pipe and The Wind and the Song. It is on display at the Los Angeles County Museum of Art.

The painting shows an image of a tobacco pipe. Below it, Magritte painted, "Ceci n'est pas une pipe" (pronounced [sə.si ne paz‿yn pip], French for "This is not a pipe".)

The famous pipe. How people reproached me for it! And yet, could you stuff my pipe? No, it's just a representation, is it not? So if I had written on my picture "This is a pipe", I'd have been lying!

— René Magritte

The theme of pipes with the text "Ceci n'est pas une pipe" is extended in Les Mots et Les Images, La Clé des Songes, Ceci n'est pas une pipe (L'air et la chanson), The Tune and Also the Words, Ceci n'est pas une pomme, and Les Deux Mystères.

The painting is sometimes given as an example of meta message like Alfred Korzybski's "The word is not the thing" and "The map is not the territory", as well as Denis Diderot's This Is Not a Story.

On December 15, 1929, Paul Éluard and André Breton published an essay about poetry in La Révolution surréaliste (The Surrealist Revolution) as a reaction to the publication by poet Paul Valéry "Notes sur la poésie" in Les Nouvelles littéraires of September 28, 1929. When Valéry wrote "Poetry is a survival", Breton and Éluard made fun of it and wrote "Poetry is a pipe", as a reference to Magritte's painting.

In the same edition of La Révolution surréaliste, Magritte published "Les mots et les images" (his founding text which illustrated where words play with images), his answer to the survey on love, and Je ne vois pas la [femme] cachée dans la forêt, a painting tableau surrounded by photos of sixteen surrealists with their eyes closed, including Magritte himself.

The away kit of the Belgian National Team for the 2026 World Cup was described by the Royal Belgian FA as “a tribute to René Magritte and Belgian Surrealism,” featuring a surrealist theme. A reference to The Treachery of Images is made through the inscription “Ceci n'est pas un maillot” (“This is not a jersey”) printed behind the collar.

== See also ==
- List of paintings by René Magritte
- Direct and indirect realism – Debate in the philosophy of mind
- Self-reference – Sentence, idea or formula that refers to itself
- Simulacra and Simulation – 1981 book by Jean Baudrillard
- Subtext – Aspect of communication that is not explicitly announced
- Theory of forms – Philosophical theory attributed to Plato
- "Haddocks' Eyes" — Another work contrasting names with the things named
- La Trahison des Clercs — Julius Benda's 1927 essay to which Magritte's title alludes
- The Reverse of a Framed Painting — An early meditation on the painting as an object of representation.
