= Franciscus Gijsbrechts =

Flemish Baroque Painter

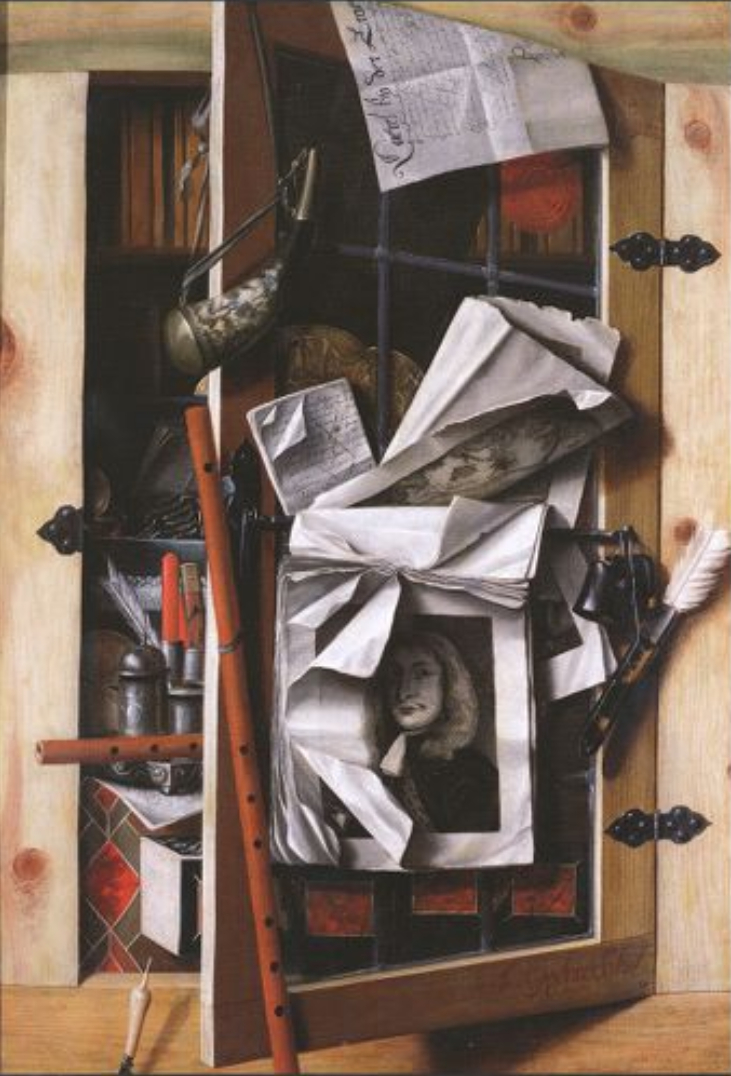
Trompe-l'œil of an open cupboard with writing tools, documents, a recorder and a portrait (possibly a self-portrait)

Franciscus Gijsbrechts, also spelled Gysbrechts, (1649, Antwerp – after 1677), was a Flemish painter who specialised in vanitas still lifes and trompe-l'œil paintings. He worked in the second half of the seventeenth century in the Spanish Netherlands, Denmark and the Dutch Republic. Like his father, Cornelis Norbertus Gijsbrechts, he painted trompe-l'œil still lifes, a still life genre that uses illusionistic means to create the appearance that the painted, two-dimensional composition is actually a three-dimensional, real object.

== Life ==
He was the son of Cornelis Norbertus Gijsbrechts and Anna Moons. He was baptised on 25 February 1649 in the St. James Church in Antwerp. His father was also a painter of still lifes and trompe-l'œils who had worked at the Danish court. Franciscus was probably trained by his father.

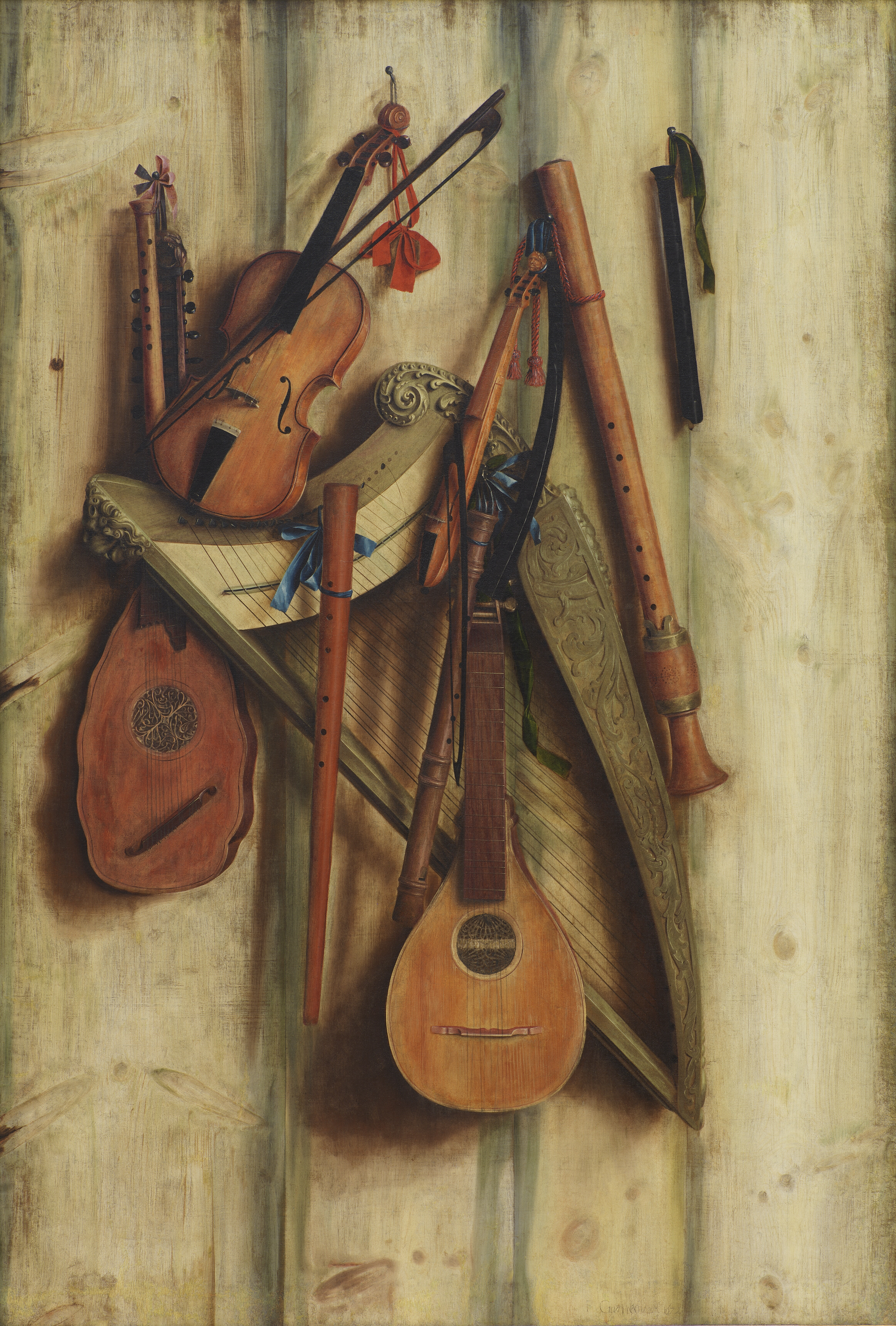
Trompe-l'œil of a Board Partition with Musical Instruments

It is possible that in 1672 he was an assistant to his father at the Danish court in Copenhagen. These connections to the court are likely as a work by him dated 1672 was already in the Danish collection before 1689. He was possibly identical with the Franciscus Gijsbrecht who was registered in 1674 in Leiden's Guild of St. Luke. This Gijsbrecht studied with a local master in Leyden and according to a document failed to pay his due to his master. In the guild year 1676/77 he was recorded in Antwerp's Guild of St. Luke as a wijnmeester, i.e. a master who is a relative of a member. This entry in the guild books is the last record on Gijsbrechts.

== Work ==
Gijsbrechts was a painter of still life and trompe-l'œil paintings. The majority of his works consist of vanitas still lifes and trompe-l'œils similar in style and subject matter to those of his father. The similarity between their works has made it difficult to distinguish between the works of the two artists and some attributions are disputed. It is generally believed that his father's style is more baroque and his brushwork softer and more fluid.

=== Trompe-l'œil ===
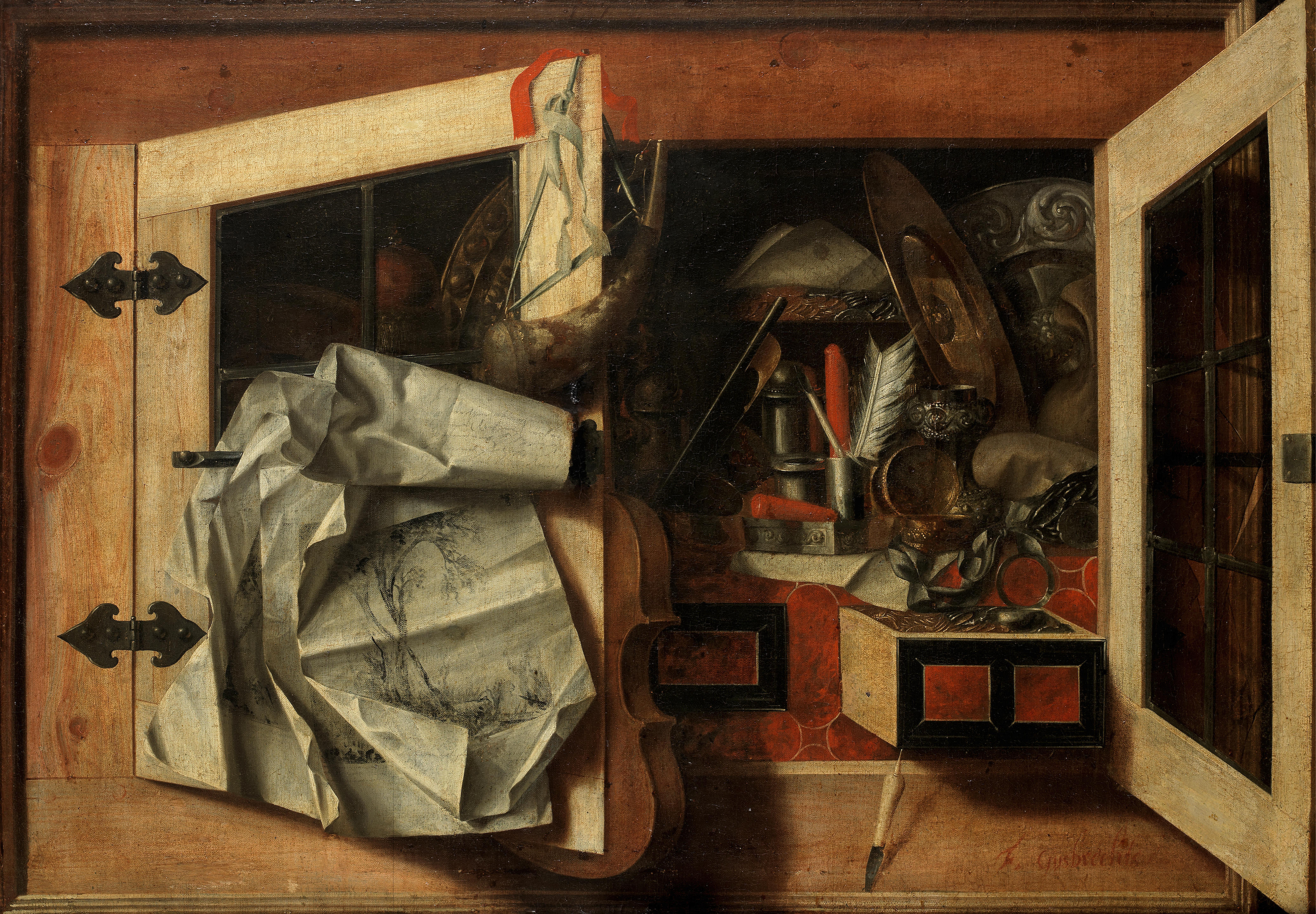
Trompe l'oeil still life of a half-open wall cabinet filled with writing implements, silver gilt dishes, a violin and a hunting horn

Gijsbrechts specialised in the trompe-l'œils that were extremely popular in the 17th century and brought it to perfection in this genre. He followed in the footsteps of his father who perfected trompe-l'œil paintings depicting studio walls, letter racks (the notice boards of the era), board walls with hunting implements and musical instruments and "chantournés" (cut-outs). One of the more elaborate compositions in Franciscus' oeuvre is the painting Trompe-l'œil still life of a half-open wall cabinet filled with writing implements, silver gilt dishes, a violin and a hunting horn (c. 1675, Bonhams London 4 December 2019 lot 24). It represents the epitome of the collector's cabinet and a personal interpretation of the cabinet of curiosities. While in his painted cabinets his father had kept the design of the half-opened cabinet rather simple, in this work Franciscus took it a step further and made it more complex.

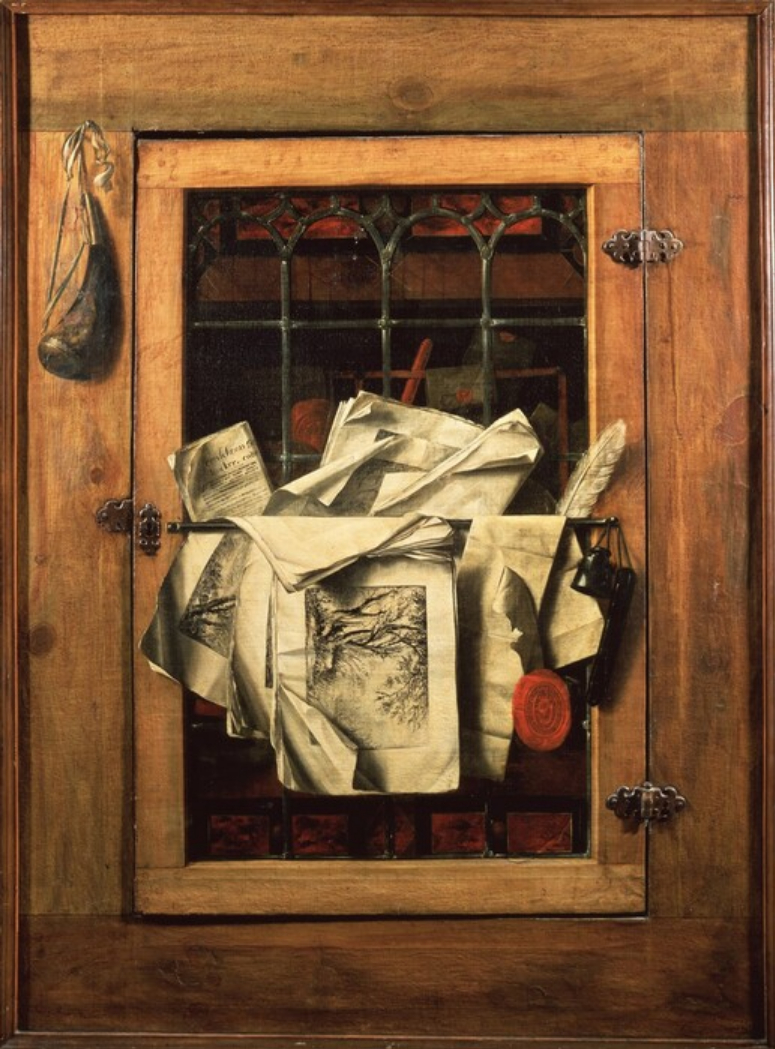
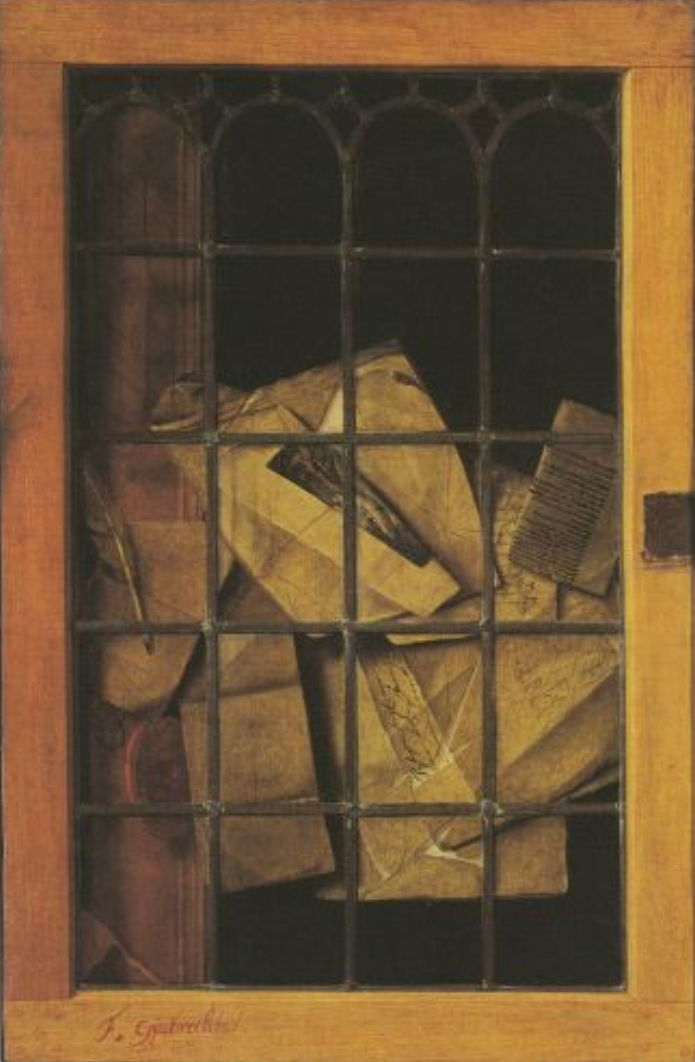
Recto and verso of the Glass Door painting

He excelled in particular in his depictions of documents. He pushed his illusionism to the limit in his two-sided trompe-l'œil painting of a cupboard with a glass door (Private collection Teresa Heinz, c. 1675). To the canvas are attached real metal hinges, a lock and a wooden door frame so that the illusionist glass door can actually be opened. He used shadows from multiple light sources to create the illusion of folded, bent and rolled documents. On the verso of the painting, Gijsbrecht created the illusion of seeing the documents through the glass of the door. As he also painted the illusion of objects inside the cupboard, it is possible that the original work had an additional layer of trompe-l'œilobjects that would have become visible upon opening the door.

=== Vanitas ===
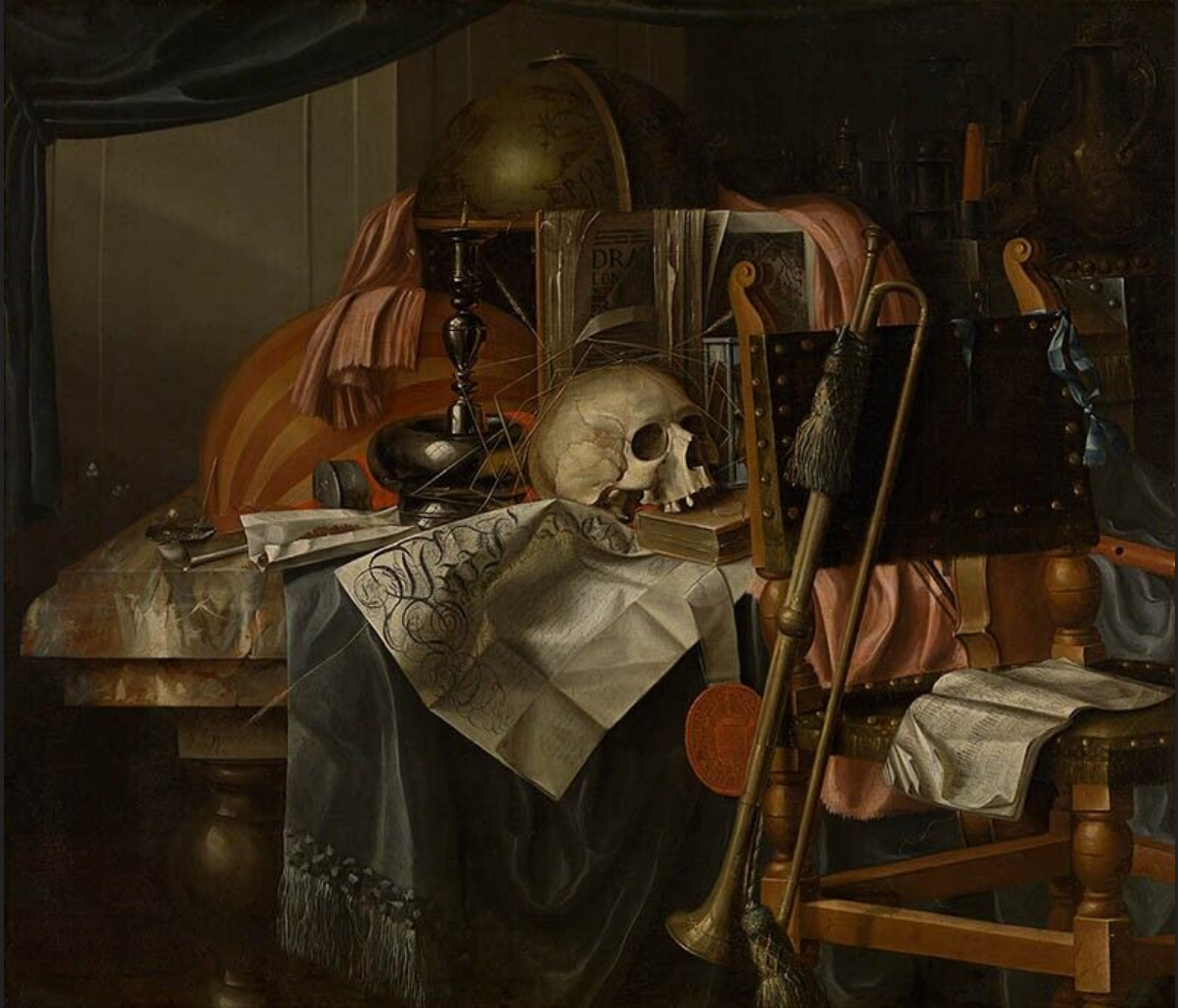
Vanitas

Many of Gijsbrecht's well-known still lifes fall into the category of vanitas paintings. This genre of still life offers a reflection on the apparent meaninglessness of earthly life and the transience of all earthly goods and pursuits. This meaning is conveyed in these still lifes through the use of stock symbols that refer to the transience of things and, in particular, the futility of earthly wealth and achievements: a skull, soap bubbles, candles, empty glasses, wilting flowers, insects, smoke, clocks, mirrors, books, hourglasses and musical instruments, various expensive or exclusive objects such as jewellery and rare shells. The worldview behind the vanitas paintings was a Christian understanding of the world as a temporary place of fleeting joys and sorrows from which humanity could only escape through the sacrifice and resurrection of Christ. The term vanitas is derived from the famous line Vanitas vanitatum et omnia Vanitas, from the Book of Ecclesiastes in the Bible, which is translated in the King James Version as Vanity of vanities, all is vain.

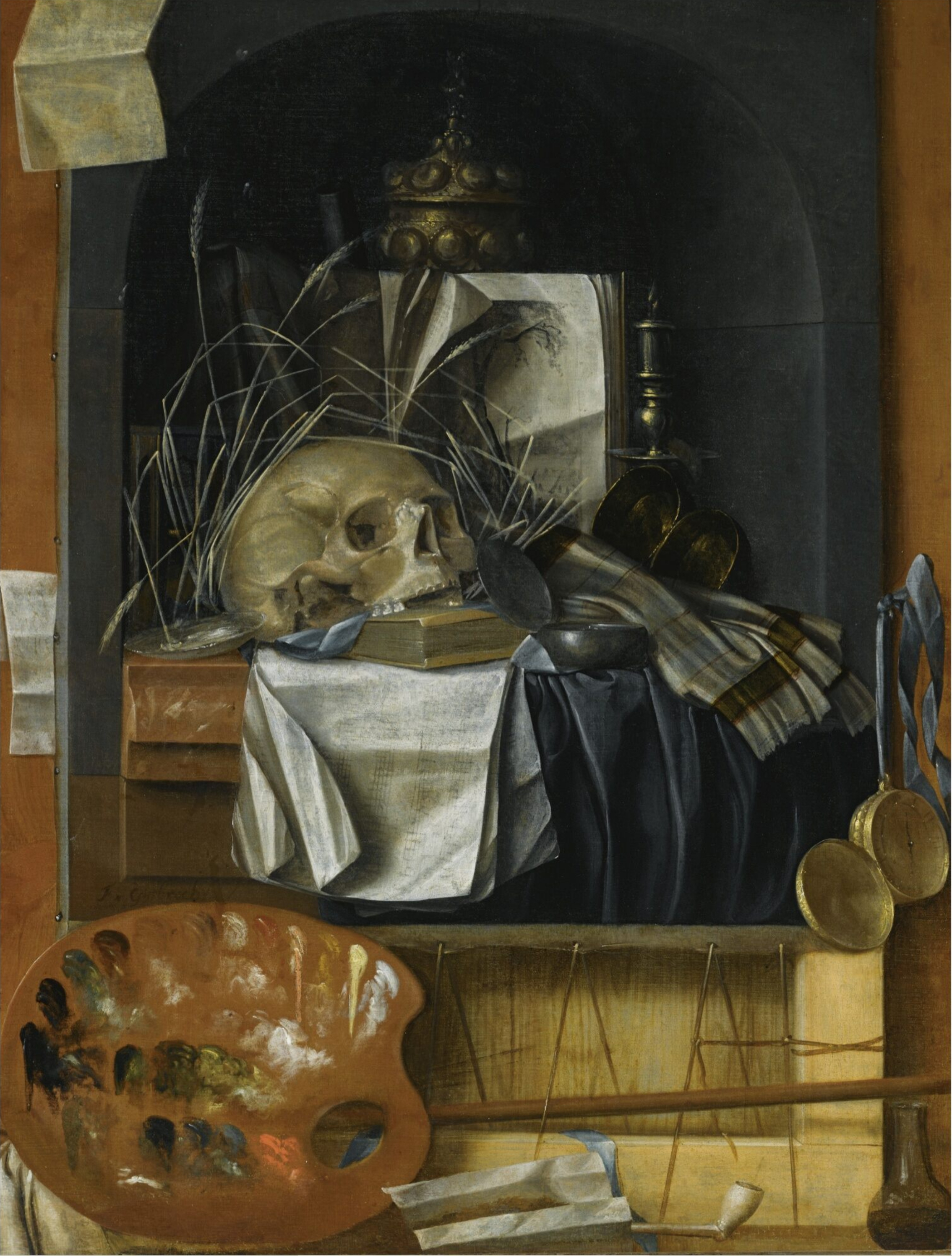
Trompe l'oeil of a vanitas still life with a clock, smoking and painters materials

While most of the symbols used in vanitas paintings refer to earthly existence (books, scientific instruments, etc.) and pleasures (pipes and other smoking utensils) or the transience of life and death (skulls, soap bubbles, empty shells), some of the symbols carry a double meaning: a rose or an oar of grain refers as much to the brevity of life as it is a symbol of the resurrection of Christ and thus eternal life.

In Trompe-l'œil of a vanitas still life with a clock, smoking and painters materials (Sotheby's 30 November 2010 Amsterdam, lot 37), Gijsbrechts presents a virtual inventory of seventeenth-century symbols of transience: the skull, smoking utensils, painters materials, an extinguished candle, a clock and an oar of grain, all painted in a highly illusionistic manner. In this way, the artist fused his proven trompe l'oeil technique with the vanitas subject.
