= Godfriedt van Bochoutt =

Flemish still life painter

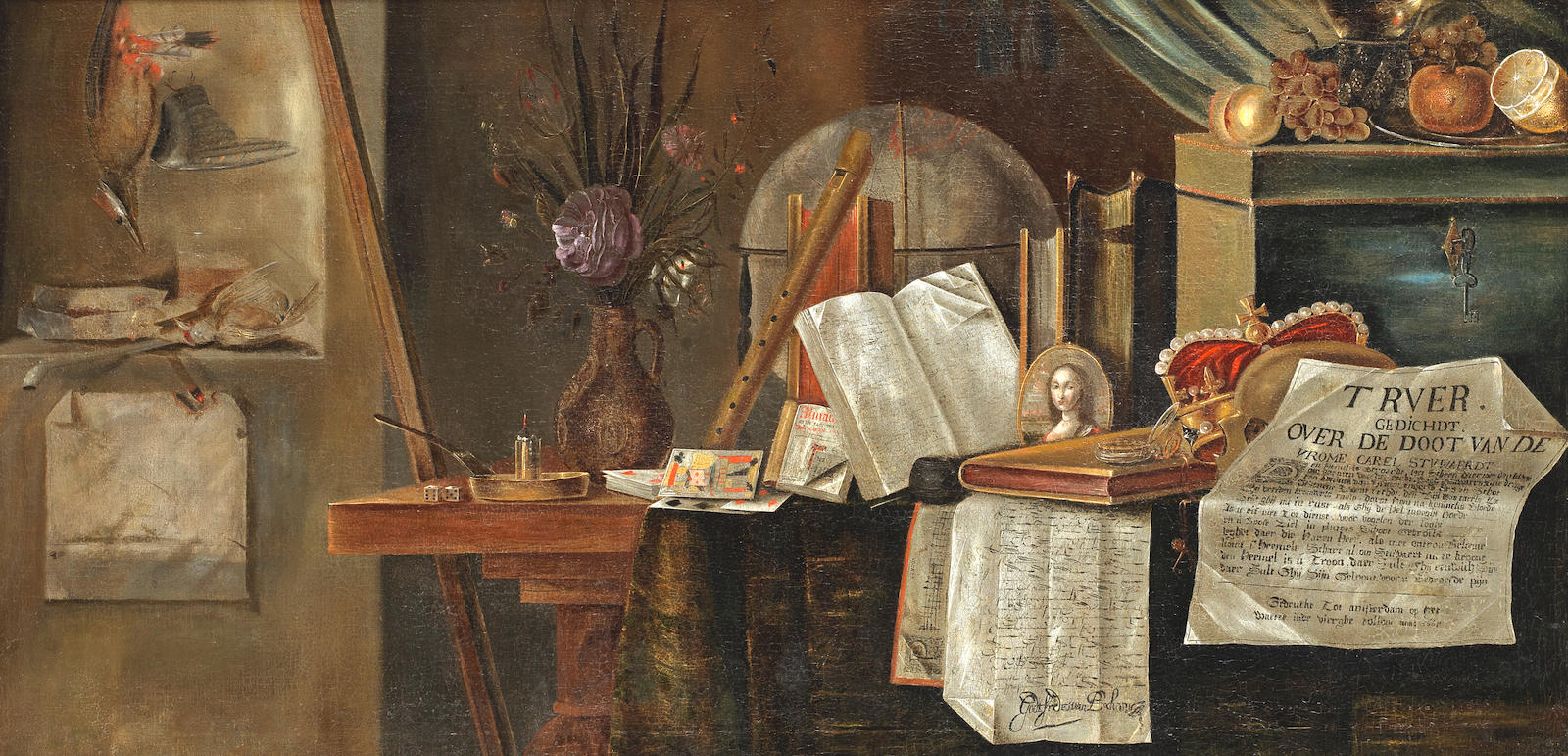
Vanitas still life with a poem on the death of Charles I

Godfriedt van Bochoutt (fl 1659–1666) was a Flemish still painter who was active in his native Bruges and Rotterdam. The limited body of work attributed to him ranges from fruit still lifes, hunting still lifes, vanitas still lifes and trompe l'oeil paintings.

== Life ==
Very little is known about van Bochoutt's life and career. It is believed that he was born in Bruges where he was active between 1659 and 1666. He may also have worked in Rotterdam in the Dutch Republic.

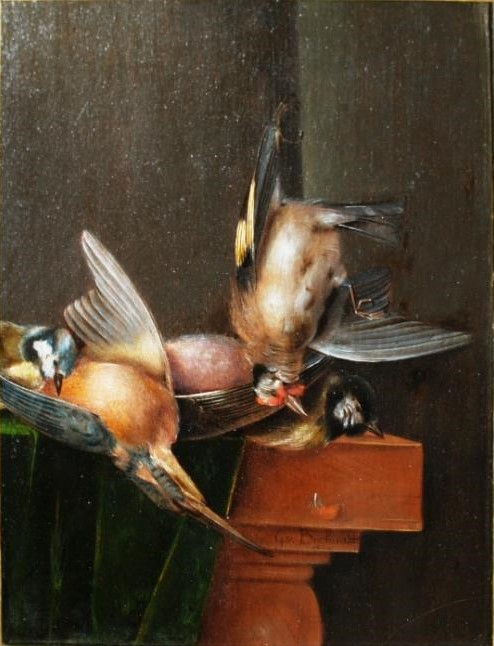
Still life with dead birds

== Work ==
Godfriedt van Bochoutt was a specialist still life painter. His known oeuvre is very limited. His subject matter ranges from fruit still lifes; hunting still lifes, vanitas still lifes and trompe l'oeil paintings.

Irrespective of their obvious subject matter, most of van Bochoutt's known still-life paintings carry a vanitas meaning. In other words, the objects in the still lifes can be regarded as references to the transient nature of all earthly goods and pursuits, the dependence on chance of life and its apparent meaninglessness. This meaning is conveyed in these still lifes through the use of stock symbols, which symbolise the transience of life and, in particular, the futility of earthly wealth and distinctions: skulls, extinguished candles, empty glasses, wilting flowers, dead animals, smoking utensils, watches, mirrors, books, dice, playing cards, hourglasses and musical instruments, musical scores, various expensive or exclusive objects such as jewellery and rare shells. The term vanitas is the key term used in the famous line Vanitas, Vanitas. Et omnia Vanitas in the Vulgate translation of the book of Ecclesiastes in the Bible. In the King James Version this line is translated as "Vanity of vanities, all is vanity".

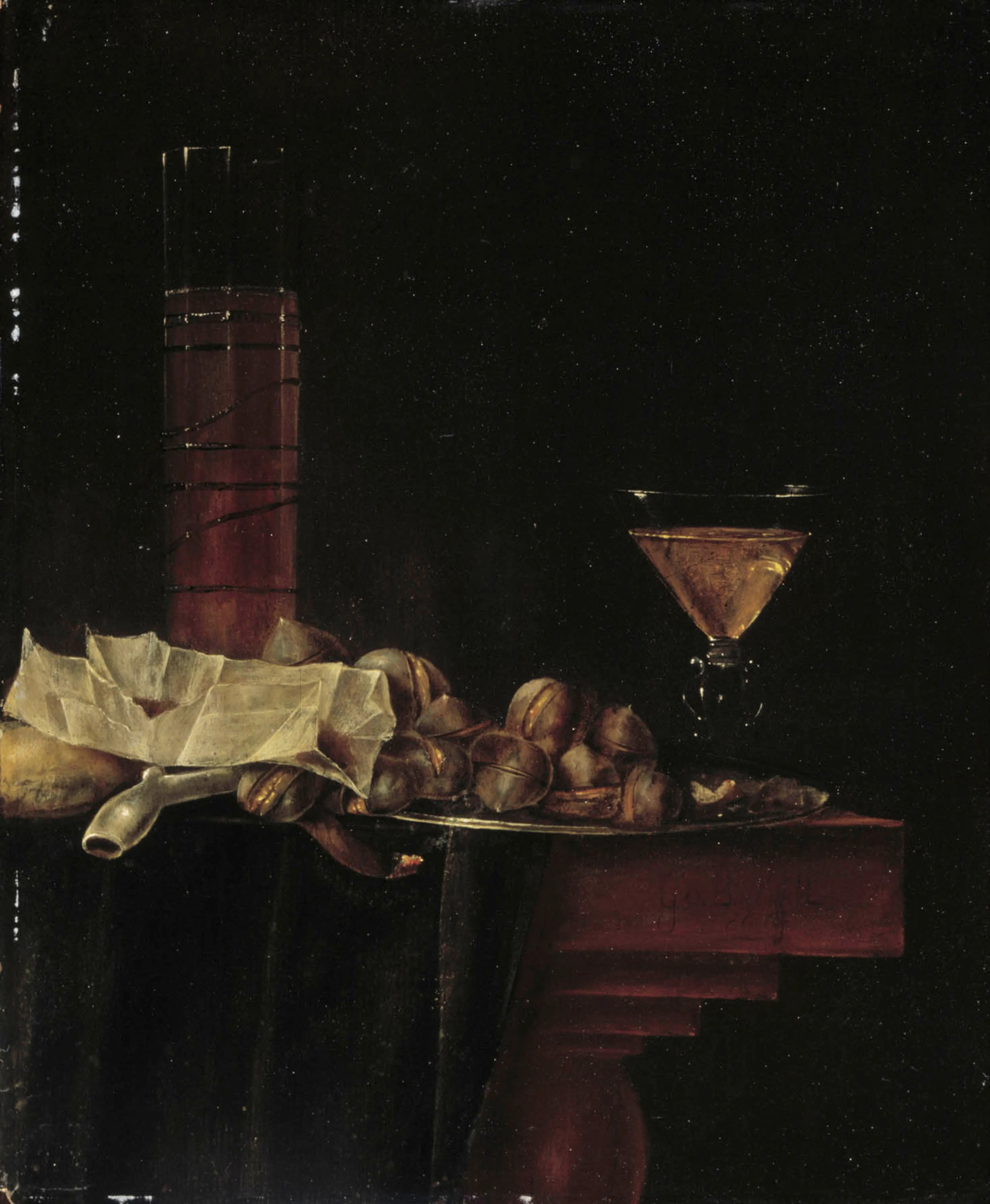
Still life of chestnuts, smoking utensils and a glass of wine on a table

These vanitas paintings were informed by a Christian understanding of the world as a temporary place of ephemeral pleasures and torments from which humanity's only hope of escape had been offered by the sacrifice and resurrection of Christ. While most of these symbols reference earthly accomplishments (books, scientific instruments, etc.), pleasures (a pipe), sorrows (symbolised by a peeled lemon), the transience of life and death (skulls, soap bubbles, empty shells) and the role of chance in life (dice and playing cards), some symbols used in these paintings carry a dual meaning: a rose or an oar of grain refers as much to the brevity of life as it is a symbol of the resurrection of Christ and thus eternal life.

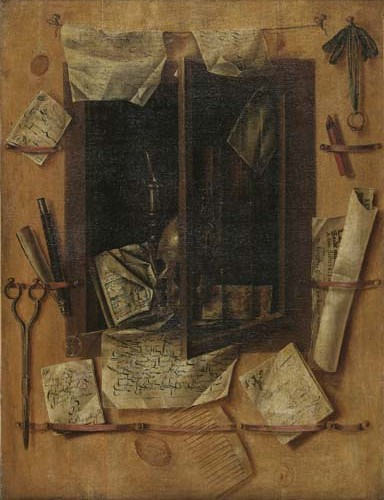
Trompe l'oeil with letters

Van Bochoutt's Vanitas still life with a poem on the death of Charles I (signed and dated 1668, at Bonhams auction of 23 October 2019, London lot 67TP) is one of his most extensive and explicit vanitas paintings. The usual moral lessons of vanitas still lifes are conveyed by the objects represented in this still life: the brevity of life and the unstoppable march of time are symbolized by the skull, extinguished candle, empty pipe, smoldering fuse, wilting flowers, decaying fruit, dead animals, an almanac and a watch; the role of chance in life by the dice and playing cards; the hardships of life in the peeled lemon and the emptiness of worldly achievements and power in the ink stand, globe, musical scores and books. The latter theme is particularly highlighted by a reference to the fate of the executed English king Charles I of England. The composition depicts a playing card of a king lying on its side, a crown and a Dutch-language mourning poem on the death of Charles I which is lying over a skull. The poem is stated at its bottom to have been printed in Amsterdam in 1665. In the Northern Netherlands there was a lot of sympathy for the executed king among the large community of exiled English Royalists and a significant number of Dutch citizens. Other Dutch and Flemish still life artists, such as Vincent van der Vinne, Hendrick Andriessen and Carstian Luyckx, were also producing vanitas still lifes on the death of King Charles I for the Dutch market. An example is the Vanitas still life with a globe, sceptre, a skull crowned with straw by Hendrick Andriessen (c. 1650, Mount Holyoke College Art Museum).

In other works of van Bochoutt the vanitas theme is also present. For instance, the Trompe l'oeil with letters (Royal Museums of Fine Arts of Belgium) depicts all kinds of mundane objects such as a comb, scissors, papers, letters and pencil stuck to a wall and a candle and books resting on a window sill. These objects take on a vanitas meaning by the presence of a skull that is peaking out from behind the window that is ajar.
