= Cornelis Norbertus Gijsbrechts =

Flemish painter (1640–1675)

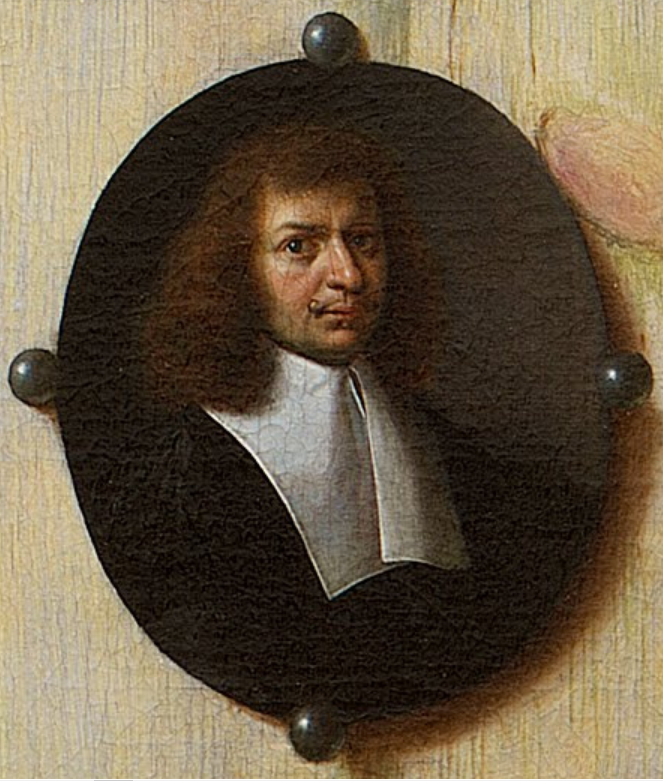
- Self-portrait, detail from A Cabinet in the Artist's Studio
- Died: After 1675
- Known for: Still life painting

Cornelis Norbertus Gijsbrechts (Note: Also spelled Gysbrechts) (Note: Dutch pronunciation: [kɔrˈneːlɪs nɔrˈbɛrtʏs ˈɣɛisbrɛxts]) (1625/1629 – after 1675), was a Flemish painter who was active in the Spanish Netherlands, Germany, Denmark, and Sweden in the second half of the seventeenth century. He was a court painter to the Danish royal family. He specialised in trompe-l'œil still lifes, an artistic genre which uses visual tricks to give viewers the illusion that they are not looking at a painting but rather at real three-dimensional objects. He also created many vanitas still lifes.

== Life ==
Details about the life of Gijsbrechts are scarce. It is not known with certainty where and when he was born. His activities in the final years of his life are also undocumented. His name is not mentioned in the contemporary art historical literature. It is assumed that he was born sometime between 1625 and 1629 in Antwerp. He married Anna Moons on 26 April 1648 in the St. James' Church in Antwerp. Their eldest son Franciscus was baptised in the same church on 25 February 1649.

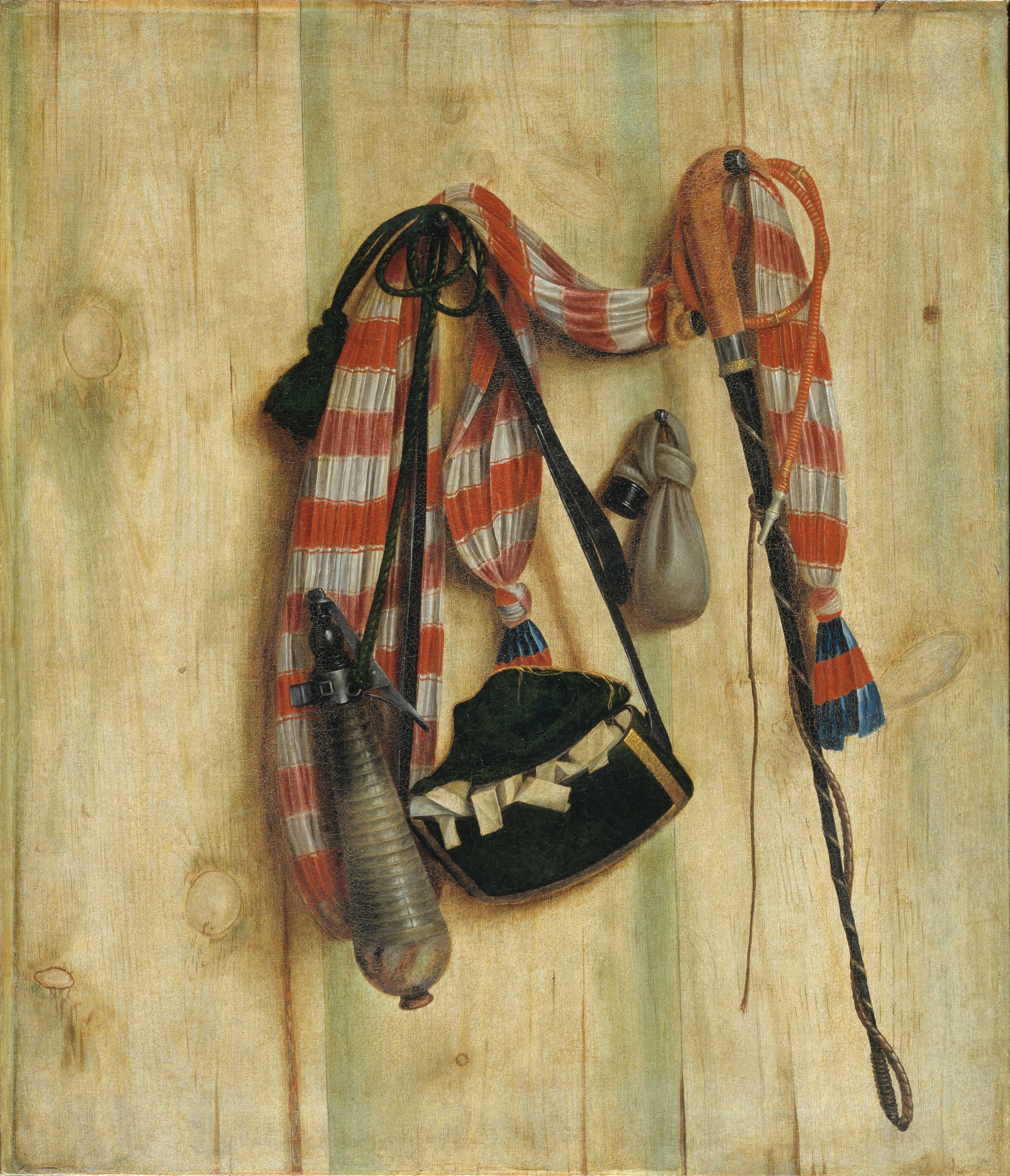
Trompe l'Oeil with Riding Whip and Letter Bag

On 16 November 1659, Gijsbrechts joined the Sodaliteit van de bejaerde jongmans ('Sodality of Elderly Bachelors'), a fraternity for bachelors established by the Jesuit order. Between 18 September 1659 and 18 September 1660 he was registered as a 'wijnmeester' (i. i.e. son of a master) in the Guild of St Luke in Antwerp.

His earliest known painting, the Vanitas still life with a young Moor presenting a pocket watch (at Ader Paris on 9 April 1990, lot 61) is dated 1657. In the early 1660s he was probably in Germany where he spent time, among other places, in Regensburg. Some art historians believe that he may have been in Emperor Leopold I's service in Regensburg, even though no records to prove such relationship have yet been found. It is assumed that Gijsbrechts moved in 1664 or 1665 to Hamburg where he stayed for a few years. In Hamburg he may have been in contact with the painter Georg Hainz, who had connections to the Danish court. This may have led to an introduction, since from 1668 to 1672 he worked as a court painter in Copenhagen. He had his studio in the Royal Garden by Rosenborg Castle and from 1670 he called himself court painter.

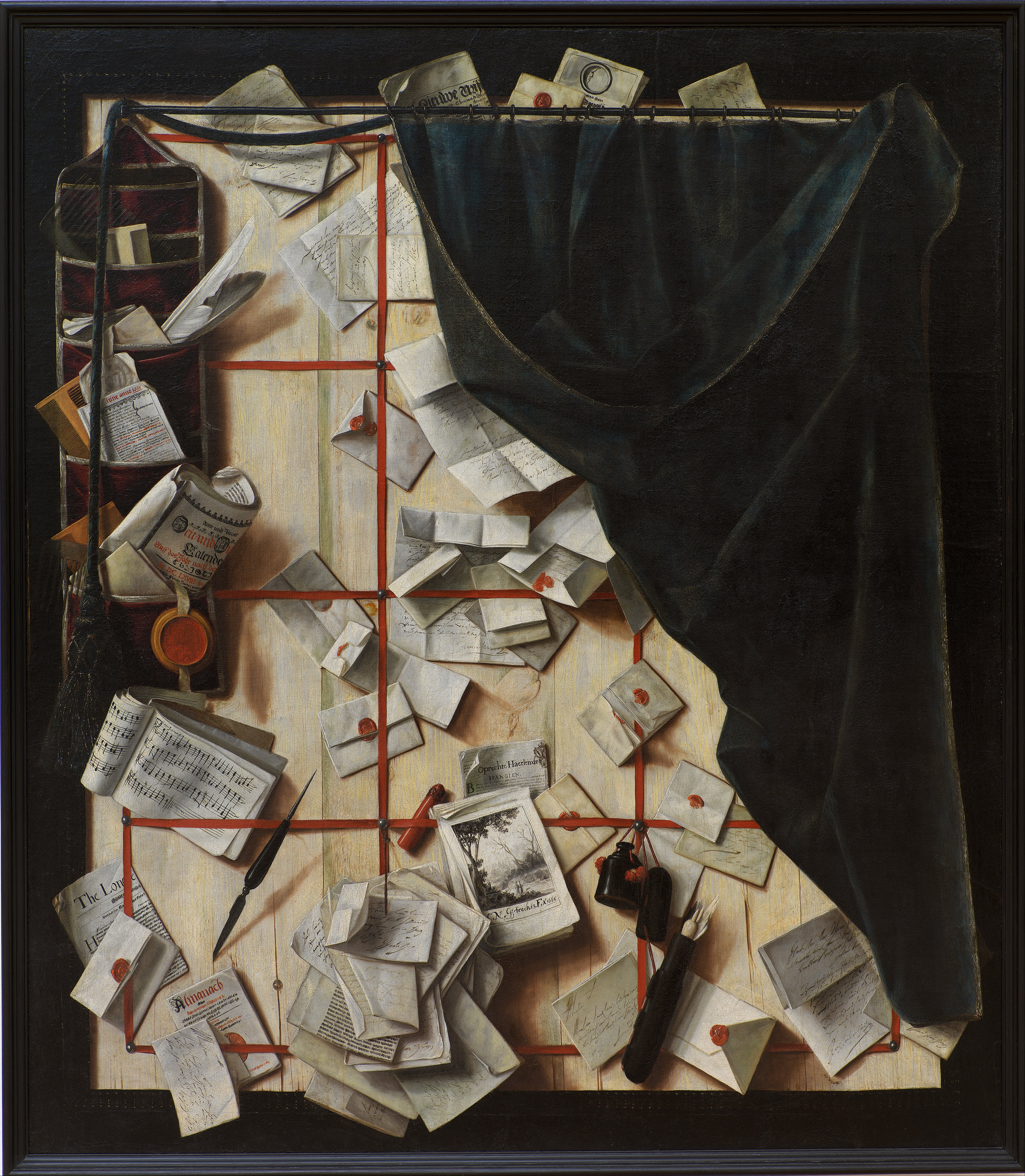
Board partition with letter rack and music book

His most prolific period as a painter falls in the short period of his stay at the court of the Danish kings Frederick III from 1668 to 1670, and thereafter Christian V from 1670 to 1672. The bulk of his known artistic output was created during this period. In the period from 1670 to 1672 he received payment for several paintings, including paintings for Rosenborg Castle. In contemporary court records he is referred to as 'dend brabandskemaler' and 'Gisbrecht brabanske maler' (the painter from Brabant). These records confirm his Flemish roots. Most of the 22 paintings Gijsbrechts painted in Copenhagen were for the King's Perspective Chamber which was part of the Royal Cabinet of Curiosities. The Perspective Chamber displayed a selection of trompe l’oeil works, perspective boxes and architectural paintings made from the central perspective. Art historian Eva de la Fuente sees in the Perspective Chamber a symbolic representation of a "worldview with the autocratic king at the centre. He is the one who dominates and understands the hidden context of things in the world. Dressed in appropriate martial virtues, he appears as a collector of the marvellous creations of art and nature". An inventory from 1690 records that 15 of the 29 paintings in the Perspective Chamber were made by Gijsbrechts.

After leaving Copenhagen, he is believed to have been in Stockholm, where in 1673 he painted a large letter rack commissioned by the bourgeoisie of the town. He likely also worked for the Swedish king.

In 1675 he is recorded in Breslau (Wrocław). From this year dates his last known work. No firm records of him after this time exist. Possibly he resided in Bruges in Flanders after this time. A painting with the inscription 'A monsieur/ Monsieur Gijsbrechts/ schilder geghenwoordig/ tot Brughe', auctioned on 14 December 2010 could possibly refer to him. However, the painting is generally dated to the period from 1664 to 1668, i.e. prior to his stay in Scandinavia.

It is not known when or where he died.

== Work ==
=== General ===
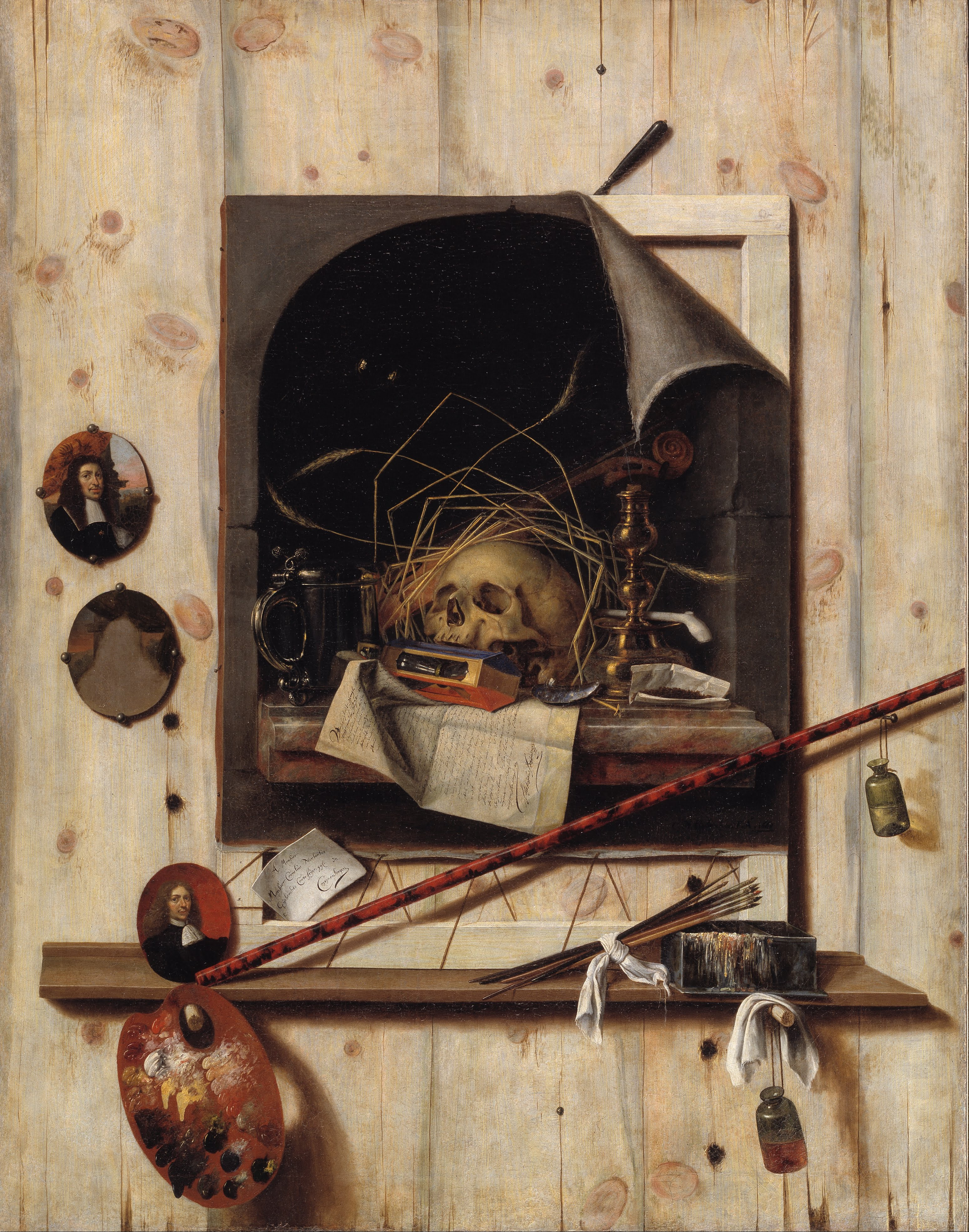
Trompe l'oeil with studio wall and vanitas still life

Approximately 70 works by Gijsbrechts are known. Gijsbrechts was a painter of still lifes. He almost exclusively painted trompe-l'œil and vanitas paintings which were popular around the second half of the 17th century. Early in his career he produced pure vanitas paintings later switching to trompe l'oeil paintings from the mid-1660s.

Of the 22 trompe l'oeil paintings he painted during his stay in Copenhagen, 19 are in the collection of the Statens Museum for Kunst in Copenhagen, two at Rosenborg Castle and one at the Museum of National History in Frederiksborg Castle. Some of the objects which he depicted with such precision in his still lifes can still be seen in Danish museums today. Because of his accurate recording of everyday objects, pieces of arts and crafts, musical instruments, scientific instruments, weapons or other hunting equipment of his time, his paintings are a valuable source for historians.

As his son Franciscus painted the same subjects in a style close to that of his father, it has sometimes been difficult to establish the authorship of certain works. Some attributions are disputed. It is generally believed that the father's style is more Baroque and his brushwork softer and more fluid than that of his son.

=== Vanitas ===
His earliest known painting is the Vanitas still life with a young Moor presenting a pocket watch (at Ader (Paris) 9 April 1990, lot 61) which is dated 1657. This painting falls within the genre of the vanitas still life, which Gijsbrechts practised principally until the later 1660s. This genre of still life offers a reflection on the meaninglessness of earthly life and the transience of all earthly goods and pursuits. The term vanitas is derived from the famous line 'Vanitas, Vanitas. Et omnia Vanitas', in the book of the Ecclesiastes in the bible, which in the King James Version is translated as "Vanity of vanities, all is vanity". The worldview behind the vanitas paintings was a Christian understanding of the world as a temporary place of fleeting joys and sorrows from which humanity could only escape through the sacrifice and resurrection of Christ.

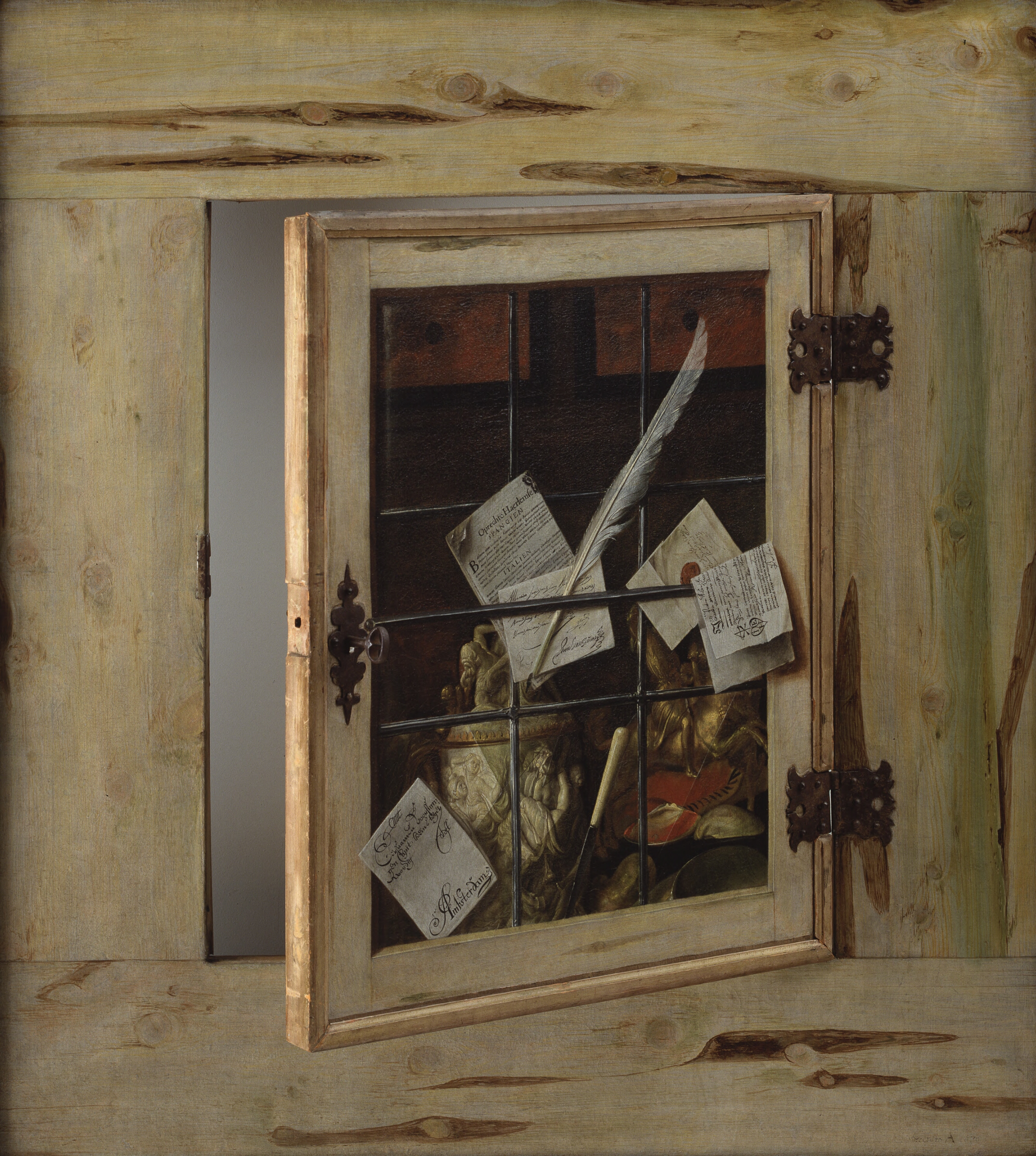
Cabinet of curiosities with an ivory tankard

This worldview is conveyed in these still lifes through the use of stock symbols that refer to the transience of things and, in particular, the futility of earthly wealth: a skull, soap bubbles, candles, empty glasses, wilting flowers, insects, smoke, clocks, mirrors, books, hourglasses and musical instruments, various expensive or exclusive objects such as jewellery and rare shells and globes. While most of these symbols refer to earthly existence (books, scientific instruments, etc.) and pleasures (a pipe) or the transience of life and death (skulls, soap bubbles, empty shells), some of the symbols used in the vanitas paintings carry a double meaning: a rose or a stalk of grain refers as much to the brevity of life as it is a symbol of Christ's resurrection, and thus eternal life.

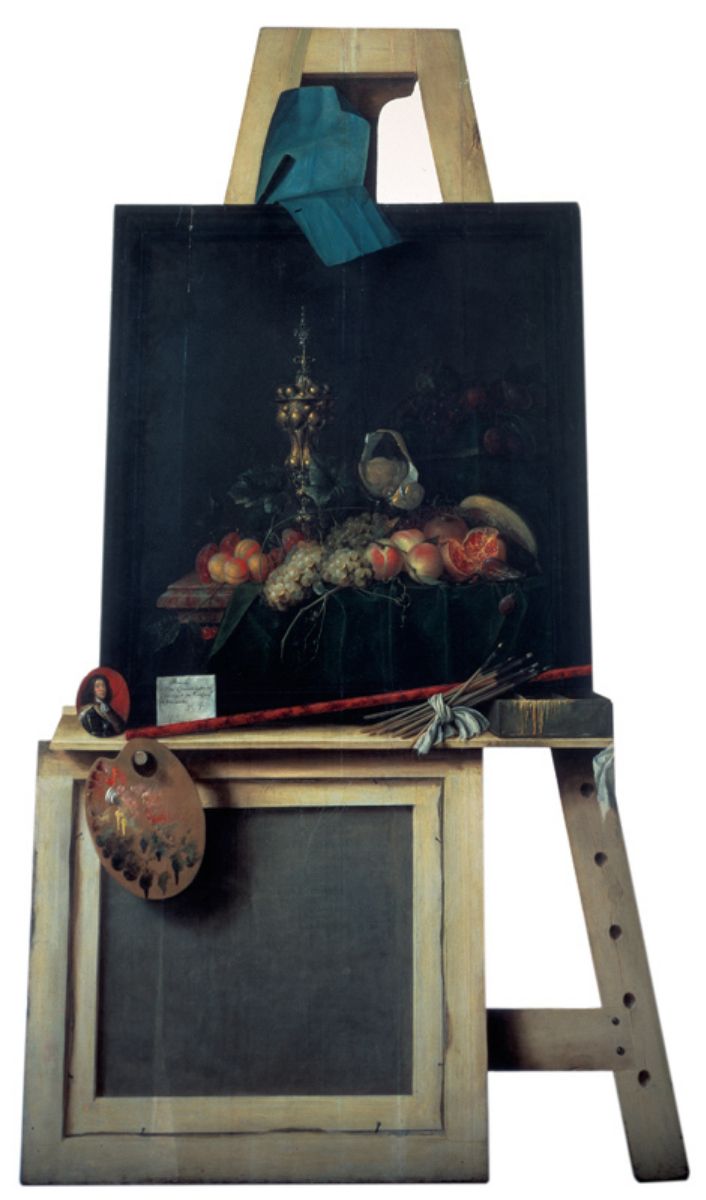
Easel with still life of fruit

In Trompe l'oeil with studio wall and vanitas still life (1668, Statens Museum for Kunst) Gijsbrechts presents a virtual inventory of seventeenth-century symbols of transience: the skull with the ears of corn, the hourglass, the extinguished candle, the soap bubble and artist paraphernalia. It contains two miniature portraits and one empty slot for another. The top left portrait is of Emperor Leopold I. The other portrait is not a self-portrait and it is not clear who it represents. The portraits allude to the mortality the deceased, even while glorifying him, within a spiritual and traditional vanitas iconography. The painting also includes the painter's "calling card" in the form of a note bearing the words "A Monsuer / Monsuer Cornelius Norbertus / Gijsbrechts Conterfeÿer ggl. In. / Coppenhagen." By painting the upper right corner of the canvas as if it had become detached from its support, he points to the fact that even the canvas of the painting (and thus the fame of the painter) cannot withstand the relentless progression of time and its destructive force. In this way, the artist fused his trompe l'oeil technique with the vanitas subject.

=== Trompe l'oeil ===
In the 1660s, Gijsbrechts abandoned the pure vanitas still life paintings by integrating the vanitas motifs into increasingly complex trompe l'oeil compositions, which depict studio walls, letter racks (the notice boards of the era), board walls with hunting implements and musical instruments and "chantournés" (cut-outs). The latter took the deception of the eye one step further, as the painted panel or canvas was cut in a shape intended to fool viewers into believing that they were standing in front of a three-dimensional object. For the illusion to be even more convincing, Gijsbrechts primarily painted motifs and objects naturally found in the surroundings of the royal family, and he painted these as close to the natural sizes as possible. A series of these Kunstkammer inventories was created especially for the art-loving King Frederik III. For the king's successor, Christian V, who loved hunting more than art, Gijsbrechts painted various hunting trompe-l'œil paintings and two pictures showing the gear for hounding and falconry.

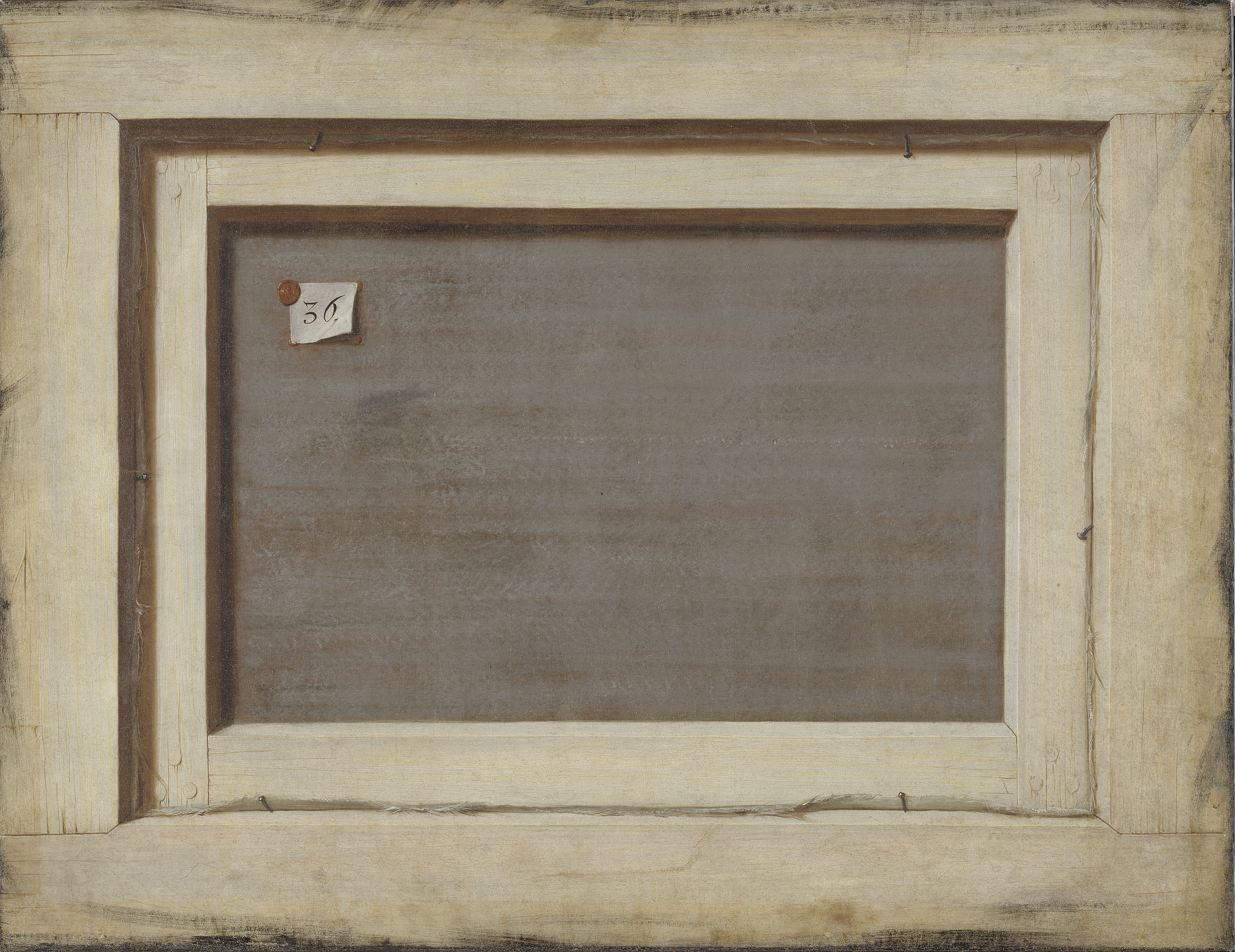
The Reverse of a Framed Painting

Gijsbrechts often used the illusionistic device of a curtain to partially cover the principal object depicted in the painting. Gijsbrechts is alluding thus to the common 17th-century practice of protecting precious paintings behind a curtain. Gijsbrecht pushed the limits of the trompe-l'œil painting to its limits with his picture Easel with still life of fruit (1670-72, Statens Museum for Kunst). It has the outline of an easel sawn out of wood, with three pictures leaning against it and all kinds of objects attached to it. On the easel is a still life of fruit, with an unfolded letter hanging over its upper edge. In front of sill life he painted or attached various painting utensils, including a painting stick that originally protruded far into the room and a hook from which the palette dangles. On the left of the still life painting a small oval picture with the portrait of his patron Christian V is painted and immediately next to it is a note with the painter's signature. On the floor is another trompe l'oeil picture which leans against a leg of the easel and of which only the reverse side is visible.

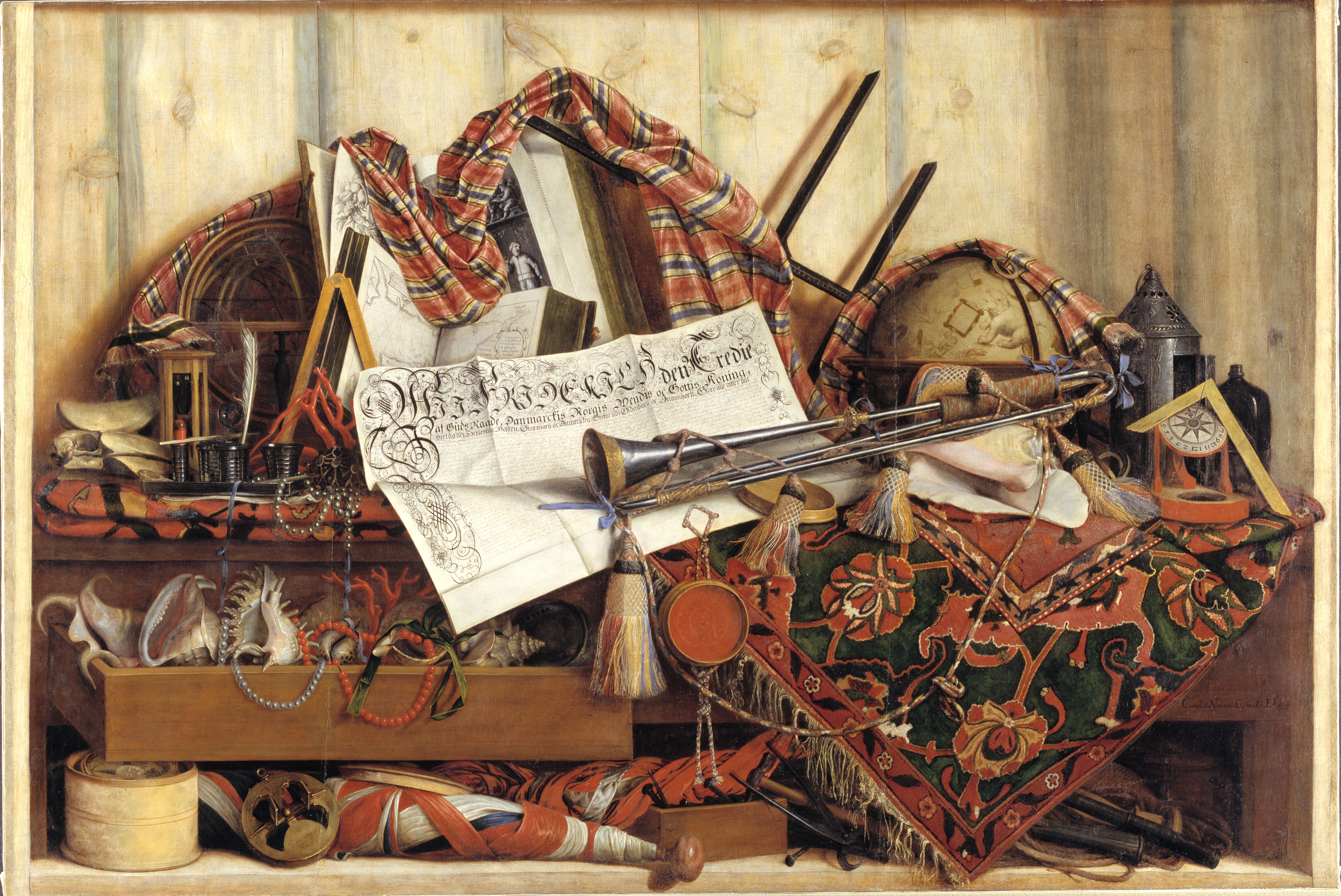
Trompe l'Oeil with trumpet, celestial globe and proclamation by Frederik III

His painting The Reverse of a Framed Painting (1670, Statens Museum for Kunst) is one of his most original contributions to the trompe-l'œil genre. It is a deceptively sculptural representation of the back of a canvas frame with the small nails fixing the canvas in the frame and a small slip of paper with an inventory number. The painting itself is unframed. The painting was displayed leaning against a wall in the entrance hall to the Royal Danish Kunstkammer thus increasing its illusionistic impact. Today, the painting is exhibited standing on the floor against the wall thus creating the idea that the painting is waiting to be hung up.

Another original trompe-l'œil is the Cabinet of curiosities with an ivory tankard (1670, Statens Museum for Kunst). This painting was in reality a cabinet door which was probably created to fit into a panel or wall in the Green Cabinet at Rosenborg Castle. The Green Cabinet held Frederik III's rich collection of art objects. The painting looks like a glass door with a metal rack in front of the glass. All kinds of objects are pinned behind the rack such as letters, newspaper advertisements, a quill pen and a pocket knife. Behind the painted glass an ivory tankard, a statue and other treasures are visible. The door has real hinges and a key hole with a key and could in fact be opened. Once opened, the objects depicted in the painting would become visible in real life. The ivory vase and possibly the statuette as well were created by German artist and ivory sculptor Joachim Henne who was also a court artist.

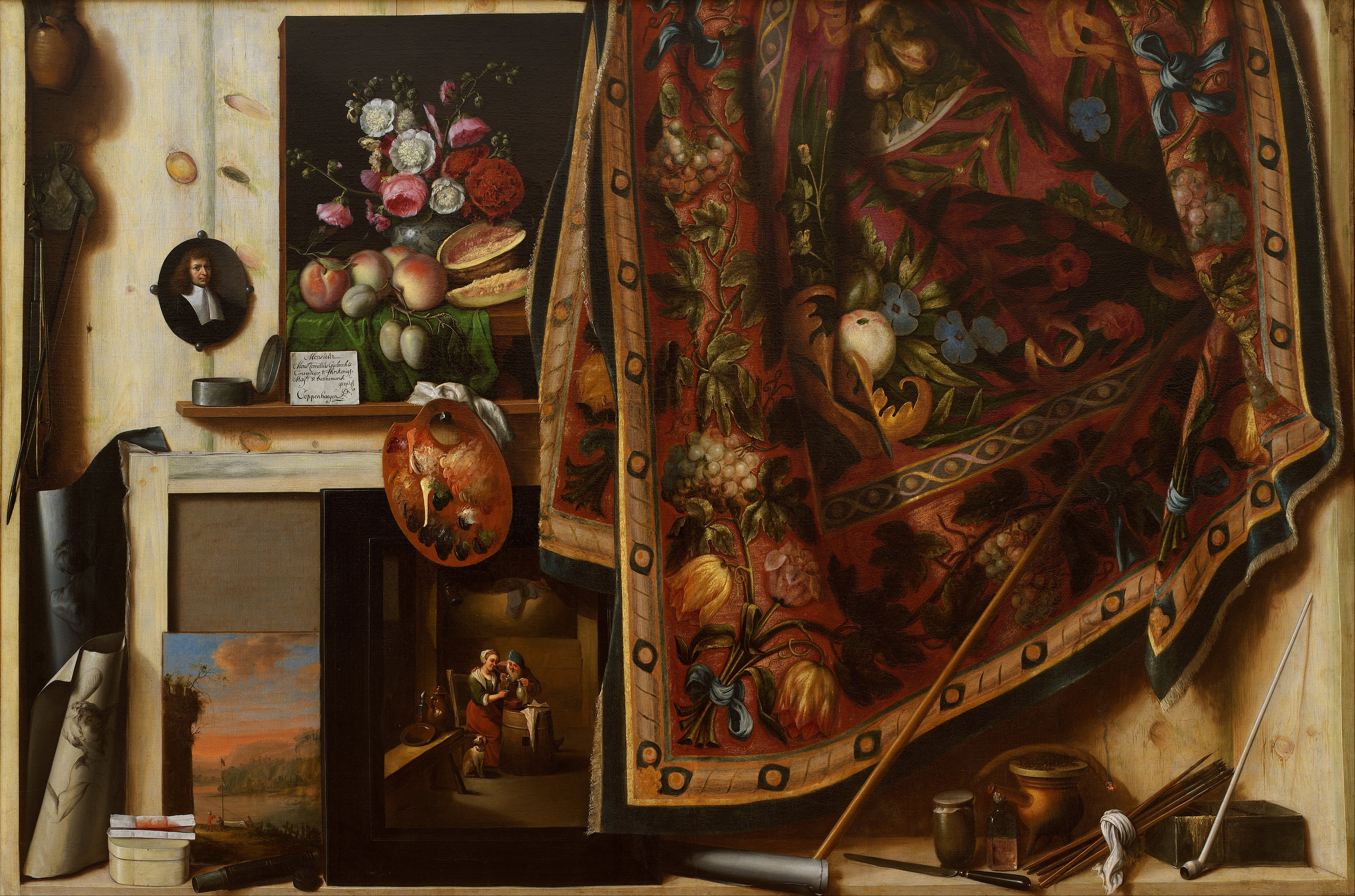
A cabinet in the artist's studio

In a pair of paintings in the Statens Museum for Kunst, Gijsbrecht demonstrated his inventiveness by combining in a novel way his trompe l'oeil techniques with the vanitas subjects for which he was known. The first one called the Trompe l'Oeil with trumpet, celestial globe and proclamation by Frederik III and dated 1670, shows the proclamation of the late King Frederik III spread out on a carpet, with a trumpet lying across the sheet. A celestial globe with the constellations and signs of the zodiac symbolises the world and an open drawer reveals its exotic riches. But there is also a flip side to this celebration of the king and his reign. All the objects are thrown about in disarray - as if cupboards had just been emptied and a clearing out of the late king's treasuries is underway.

The accompanying painting referred to as A cabinet in the artist's studio shows the painter's studio. A large tablecloth, known to have belonged to Frederik III, hangs over some of the painter's tools - a bundle of brushes, his palette knife, his painting stick and his Dutch pipe. On the left, three pictures in the painting each tell a story. Tilted against the wall on a shelf, a still life with flowers and fruit hints at the transience of all things in this world. A self-portrait of the artist stares at the viewer with intense, shining eyes, making the painter an observer of it all. Below, an elderly man places his hand on the shoulder of a housewife as she lights a pipe - a symbol of life passing like smoke. To the left, the third image is a seascape at sunset, symbolising the evening of life. On the beach, a scene with three tiny figures takes place, with a boat on dry land signifying the boat of existence coming to a halt.
