= List of people from Sarasota =

The following is a list of notable people who were born or who live or formerly lived in the city of Sarasota, Florida.

- Carl Abbott, architect
- Erik Arroyo, former mayor of Sarasota and lawyer
- Doug Band (born 1972) , assistant to Bill Clinton and businessman. Helped found the Clinton Global Initiative and assisted with the Clinton Foundation after his presidency
- Freddie Bartholomew (1924–1992), child actor in 1930s
- Roy Basler (1906–1989), historian
- Dickey Betts (1943–2024), guitarist and founding member of The Allman Brothers Band
- Duane Betts (born 1978), singer-songwriter, guitarist, and member of The Allman Betts Band
- Kevin Biegel, writer-producer, screenwriter
- Antonio Blakeney (born 1996), basketball shooting guard in the Israeli Basketball Premier League; former NBA player
- Vern Buchanan (born 1951), U.S. representative
- Daniel Bukantz (1917–2008), Olympic fencer
- Eugene A. Burdick (1912–2000), North Dakota District judge and surrogate judge for the North Dakota Supreme Court
- William J. Burns (1861–1932), Director of the Bureau of Investigation, later the Federal Bureau of Investigation
- Flossie M. Byrd (1927–2020), home economist and academic
- Lincoln Child (born 1957), author of techno-thriller and horror novels
- Barber Conable (1922–2003), New York state senator, U.S representative from New York, and World Bank President under President Ronald Reagan
- Marlow Cook (1926–2016), U.S. senator from Kentucky
- Eric Curran (born 1975), racing driver
- Vincent D'Autorio (1915–2008), two-time Olympic gymnast
- Ian Desmond (born 1985), professional baseball player for the Colorado Rockies
- Lois Duncan (1934–2016), writer, novelist, poet, and journalist
- Gil Elvgren (1914–1980), painter of pin-up models
- Richard Floethe (1901–1988), printmaker and illustrator
- Sonia Pressman Fuentes (1928–2025), lawyer; author and co-founder of National Organization for Women
- Jackie Gerlich (1925–1960) , dwarf actor and circus entertainer
- Brian Gottfried (born 1952), tennis player, reached Nº3 in the world in 1977
- Carla Gugino (born 1971), actress
- Dalton Guthrie (born 1995), Major League Baseball player for the San Francisco Giants
- James A. Haley (1899–1981), U.S. representative from Florida and member of the Florida House of Representatives. President of the Ringling Bros. and Barnum & Bailey Circus. Delegate to the Democratic National Convention in 1952, 1956, and 1960
- Denver David Hargis (1921–1989), U.S. representative from Kansas
- Forest Harness (1895–1974), U.S representative from Indiana and Sergeant at Arms of the Senate
- Ian Hornak (1944–2002), founding artist of the Hyperrealist and Photorealist fine art movements; owned a local winter home.
- Tim Jaeger (born 1979), artist
- Brian Johnson (born 1947), lead singer of AC/DC
- Mackinlay Kantor (1904–1977), Pulitzer Prize winning author
- Josh Kaufman (born 1976), soul singer and singer-songwriter
- Margaret Kerry (born 1929), actress, radio host, and model for Tinker Bell in the 1953 Walt Disney film Peter Pan
- Stephen King (born 1947), author
- David Lawrence (1888–1973), publisher; founded what would later become U.S. News & World Report
- La Norma Fox (1926–2026), trapeze artist in RBB Circus and Sarasotan from 1949 onwards
- Mirjana Lučić-Baroni (born 1982), professional tennis player
- Victor A. Lundy (1923–2024), architect
- Jes Macallan (born 1982), actress
- John D. MacDonald (1916–1986), crime novelist
- Marlon Mack (born 1996), running back for the Indianapolis Colts of the National Football League
- George E. Martin (1902–1995), US Army major general, lived in Sarasota during retirement
- Myka Meier (born 1982), etiquette coach and writer
- Eric Minkin (born 1950), American-Israeli basketball player
- Daniel Myrick (born 1963), director of horror films
- Bello Nock (born 1968), daredevil and circus performer
- Carol Perkins (born 1957), fashion model
- Jack Perkins (1933–2019), reporter, commentator, war correspondent, and anchorman
- Joe Perry (born 1950), lead guitarist of Aerosmith
- Guy Peterson (born 1953), architect
- Paul Reubens (1952–2023), actor known for creating and portraying Pee-wee Herman
- Michael Rey (born 1979), abstract painter
- Charles Edward Ringling (1863–1926), one of the Ringling brothers
- Stephen Root (born 1951), actor, voice actor and comedian
- Milton Rubenfeld (1919–2004), pilot and one of five founding pilots of Israeli Air Force
- Randy Savage (1952–2011), professional wrestler
- Tim Seibert (1927—2018), architect
- Monica Seles (born 1973), former no.1 tennis player
- Sharon Shewmake (born 1980), Washington State Senator was born and raised in Sarasota
- Sam Shields (born 1987), cornerback in the National Football League
- George Snyder (1929–2017), Maryland state senator and majority leader
- Kyle Snyder (born 1977), Tampa Bay Rays pitching coach
- Dick Smothers (born 1938), actor, comedian, composer and musician; one half of the Smothers Brothers
- Syd Solomon (1917–2004), abstract artist
- Jerry Springer (1944–2023), television personality
- Ben Stahl (1910–1987), artist, illustrator and author.
- Alex Steinweiss (1917–2011), graphic artist, credited with being the inventor of album cover art.
- Greg Steube (born 1978), U.S. representative and former Florida senator and Florida representative
- Mildred Ladner Thompson (1918–2013), journalist and writer
- Ralph Twitchell (1890–1978), architect, cofounded Sarasota School of Architecture
- Dick Vitale (born 1939), college basketball coach and broadcaster
- Adrienne Vittadini (born 1943), fashion designer
- Noelia Voigt (born 1999), interior designer, won Miss USA 2023
- Joseph Volpe (born 1940), general manager of the Metropolitan Opera
- Nik Wallenda (born 1979), tightrope walker
- Iain Webb (born 1959), director of The Sarasota Ballet and former dancer with The Royal Ballet
- Scott Weiss, venture capitalist
- Hoyt Wilhelm (1922–2002), Major League Baseball pitcher and Baseball Hall of Fame inductee
- George Howard Williams (1871–1963), U.S Senator from Missouri
- Geoff Wilson (born 1978), entrepreneur, investor, and sports card collector
- Jack West (1922–2010), architect, leader in the Sarasota School of Architecture.
- Robert Windom (1930–2016), former Assistant Secretary for Health and Human Services
- Linda Winikow (1940–2008), politician and New York State Senator
- Roger Zare (born 1985), composer and pianist
- Bridgett Zehr (born c. 1985), ballet dancer with the English National Ballet
