= CardsHQ =

American retail company

- Type: Private
- Industry: Trading cards, collectibles
- Founders: Geoff Wilson; Ryan Van Oost; Carter Musgrave
- Headquarters: Atlanta, Georgia, United States
- Products: Sports cards, Pokémon cards, trading card games
- Services: Retail sales, live auctions, grading submissions
- Website: cardshq.com

CardsHQ is an American retailer and auction house specializing in sports trading cards, Pokémon cards, and other collectibles. The company is headquartered in Atlanta, Georgia, and is co-owned by Geoff Wilson, Ryan Van Oost, and Carter Musgrave.

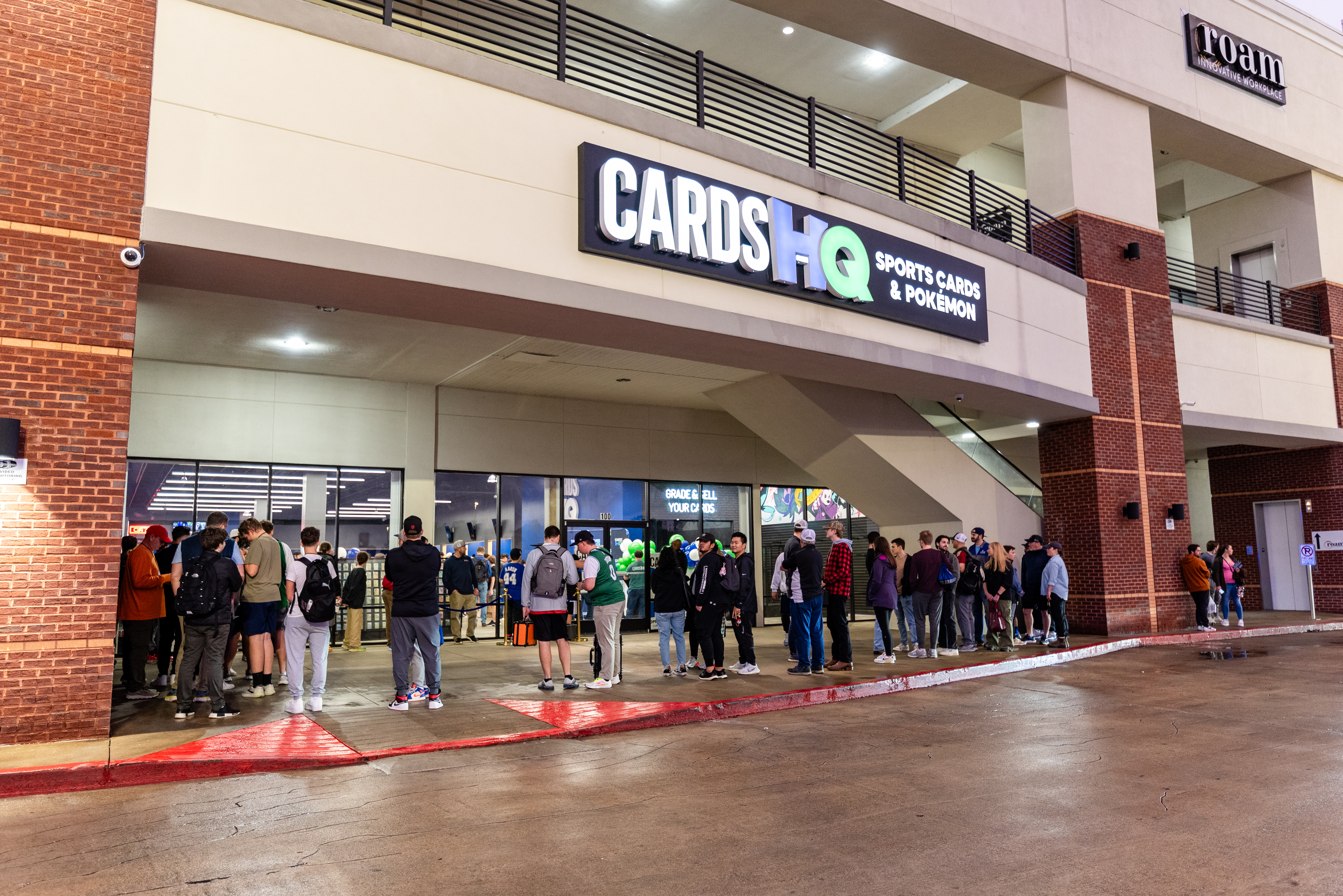
CardsHQ store front in Atlanta

== History ==
CardsHQ was founded in Atlanta, Georgia, by Geoff Wilson, Ryan Van Oost, and Carter Musgrave with the aim of establishing a central hub for trading card collectors in the southeastern United States. Initially operating as a local card shop, the business later expanded its offerings to include live card breaks, online auctions, and in-store events, drawing participation from collectors throughout the region.

== Operations ==
The company's Atlanta headquarters includes a retail showroom and event space, where collectors can attend live auctions, card shows, and trading nights. CardsHQ also operates an online platform that allows nationwide participation in auctions and card breaks.

== Products and services ==
CardsHQ's offerings include:

- Sports trading cards such as baseball, basketball, and football cards
- Pokémon and other trading card game products
- Sealed boxes, individual packs, and single cards
- Card grading submissions through major third-party grading companies
- Live and online auctions for rare and high-value cards

== Community engagement ==
CardsHQ hosts collector-focused events including trading nights, educational sessions for beginners, and charity auctions. Wilson frequently appears in online video content and social media streams, which has contributed to the store's visibility in the trading card community.

== See also ==
- Trading card
- Sports card
- Pokémon Trading Card Game
