= Newtown (Sarasota, Florida) =

African American neighborhood in Florida

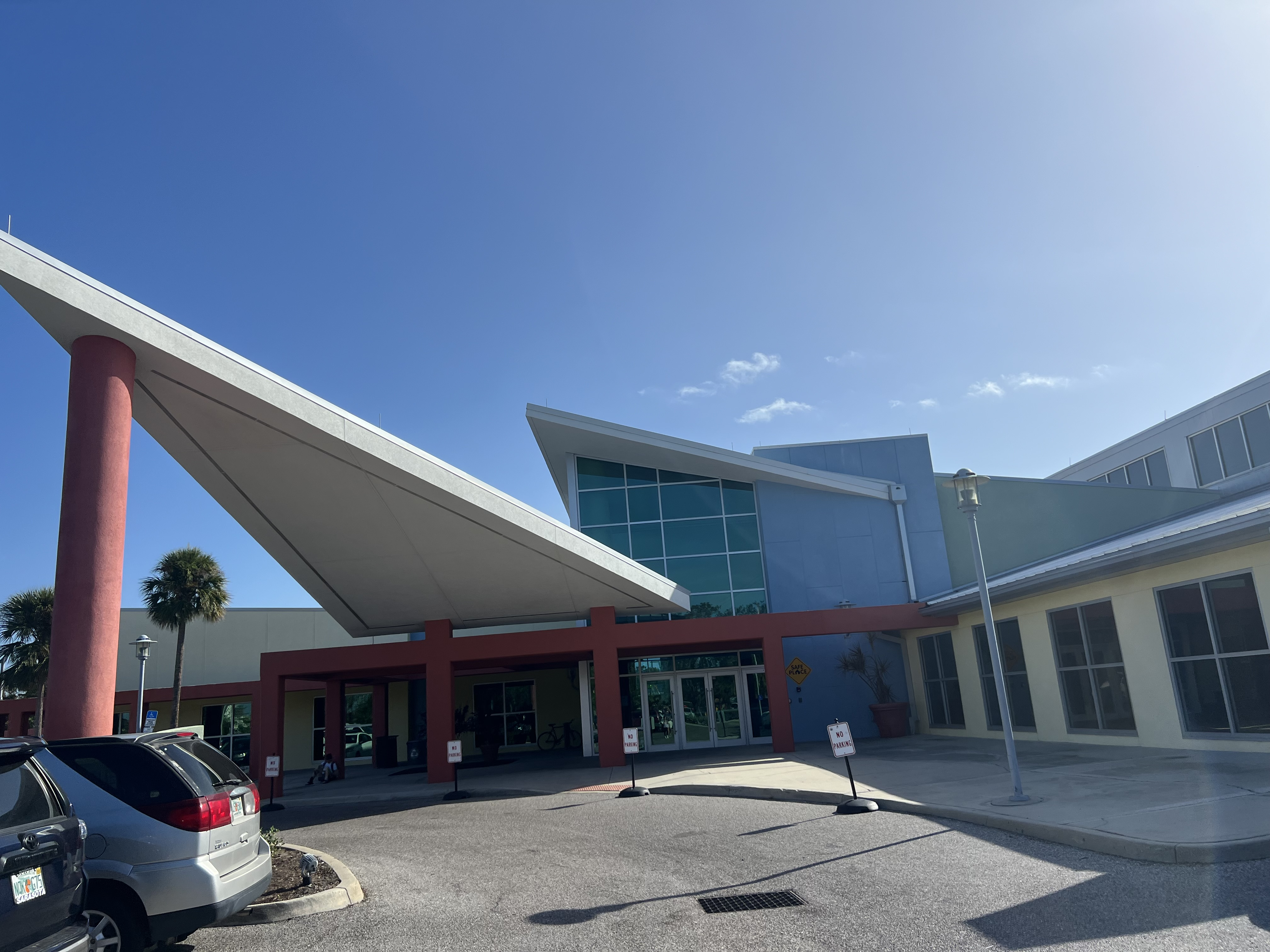
Robert L. Taylor Community Complex in December 2024 in Sarasota, Florida

Newtown is a predominantly African American community in Sarasota, Florida. Emma E. Booker Elementary, Booker Middle School, and Booker High School are in Newtown and named for educator Emma E. Booker. A farmer's market has been held in Newtown. Historical markers commemorate aspects of the community's history. Historical trolley tours have been offered along the Newtown African American Heritage Trail by the Newtown Alive organization. The Rosemary Cemetery where Owen Burns is buried is nearby and the Robert L. Taylor Complex is in Newtown. The Newtown Historic District was added to the National Register of Historic Places in April 2024. It includes Galilee Cemetery.

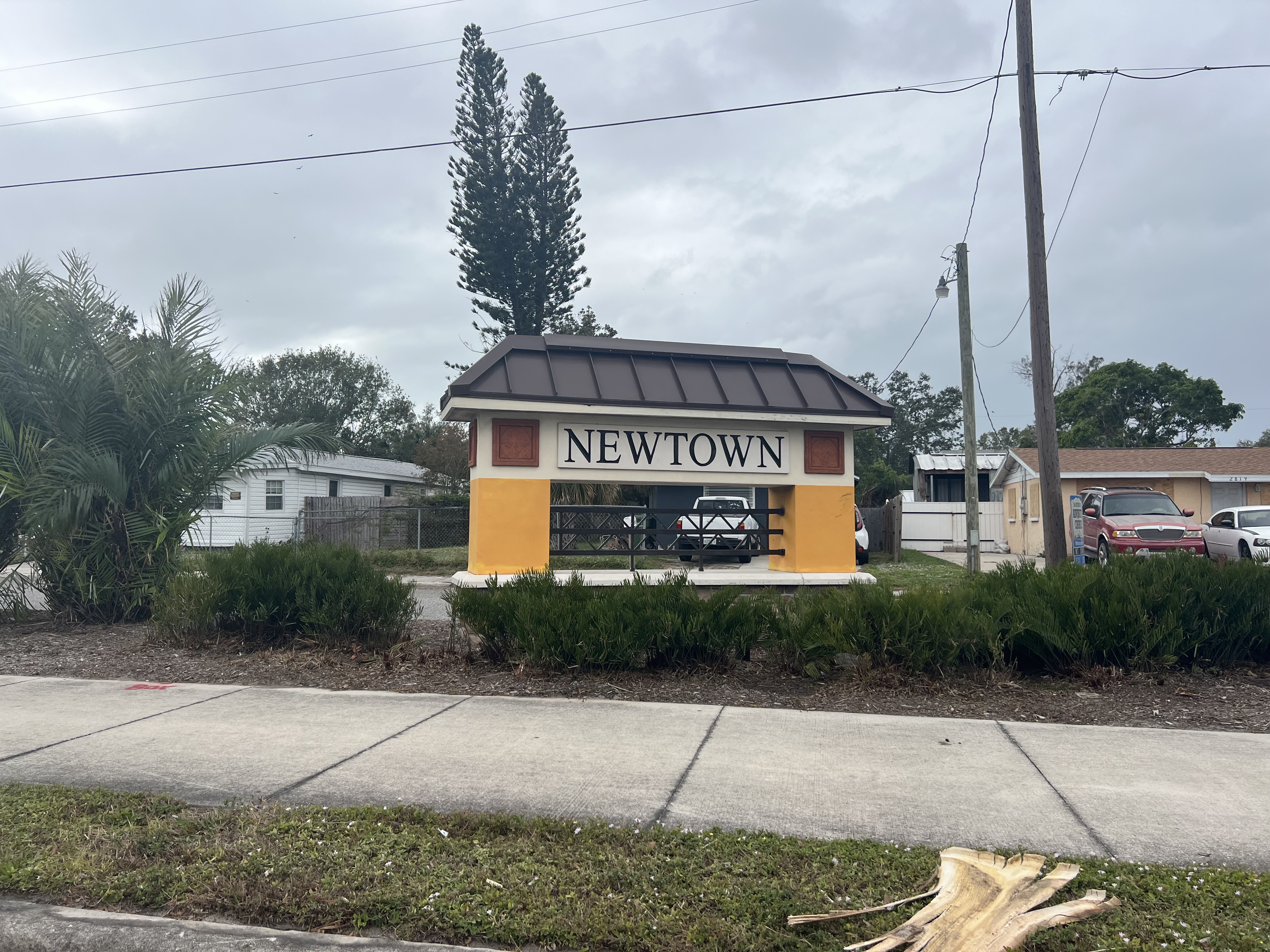
Signage for Newtown in Sarasota, Florida

== History ==
Newtown was preceded by Angola and Overtown, both areas African Americans were forced out of. Newtown Plat was filed with Manatee County April 20, 1914 and included 96 building lots. On August 6, 1914, an addition was added creating an additional 74 lots.

Greater Hurst Chapel AME Church on Links Avenue was built in 1928.

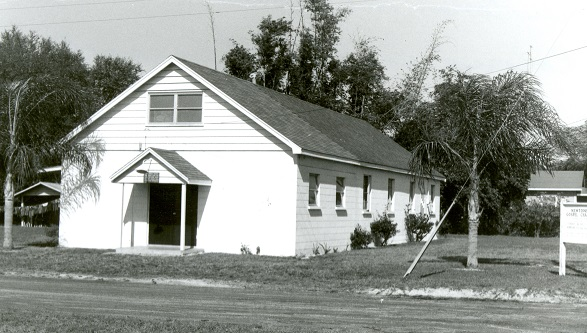
Newtown Mennonite Church in 1962

Segregation excluded African Americans from area beaches. In 1951, Newtown residents organized wade-ins to protest their exclusion from Lido Beach and other areas. Newtown Alive is a nonprofit organization working to preserve the history of Sarasota’s African-American community. The historic Wright Bush house at 1723 Dr. Martin Luther King Jr. Way is in Newtown.

In 2011, two British tourists were murdered in the area drawing media coverage.

In 2021, Sarasota County sought to develop an area of Newtown with multi-family housing.

== Amenities ==
The area is served by the Robert L. Taylor Community Complex and Betty J. Johnson North Sarasota Library.

Stroke’s Seafood offering foods including grits, fried okra, yellow rice, and sausage, as well as Town Hall Restaurant & Lounge, as well as various food trucks are coming the area's culinary venues. Sarasota is also home to the Westcoast Black Theatre Troupe (WBTT.

== See also ==
- Leonard Reid House, former home in Overtown that is now a museum and cultural center
