= Leonard Reid House =

Historic house in Florida, United States

- U.S. National Register of Historic Places
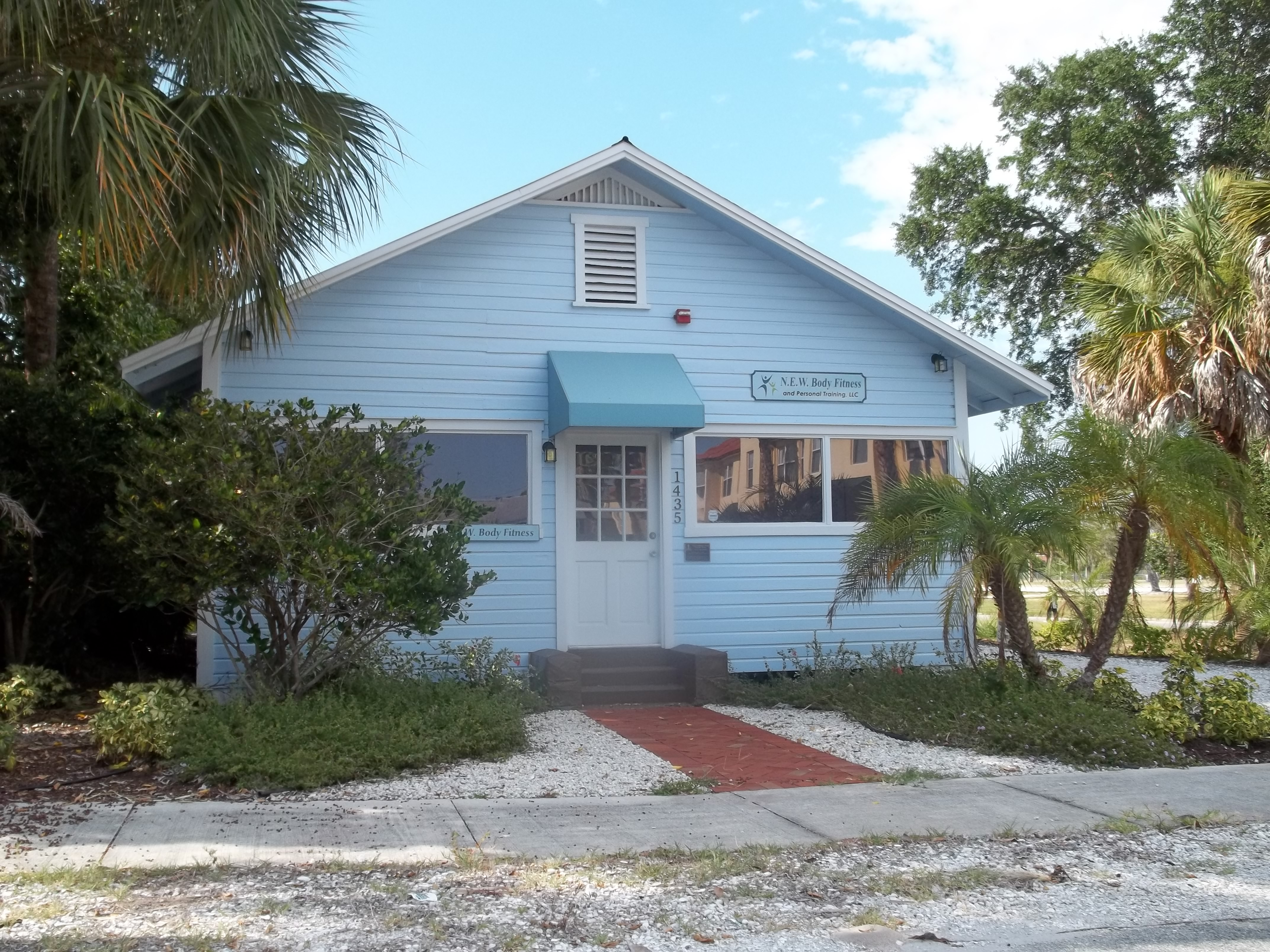

- Location within Florida Location within the United States
- Location: 2529 N. Orange Avenue, Sarasota, Sarasota County, Florida
- Coordinates: 27°21′33″N 82°32′19.52449″W
- Built: 1926
- NRHP reference No.: 02000780
- Added to NRHP: October 29, 2002

The Leonard Reid House is a historic home in Sarasota, Florida, United States. It was originally located at 1435 7th Street. On October 29, 2002, it was added to the U.S. National Register of Historic Places.

The frame vernacular residence was built in 1926 on Coconut Avenue in Sarasota's Overtown neighborhood. Reid and his family were prominent members of Sarasota's African American community. It was moved to 2529 N. Orange Avenue on May 20, 2022 where it will be the home for the Sarasota African American Cultural Coalition.

== See also ==
- Newtown (Sarasota, Florida)
