= John Hamilton Gillespie =

Scottish-American soldier, land developer (1852-1923)

- Born: 14 October 1852; Edinburgh, Scotland
- Died: September 7, 1923 (aged 70); Sarasota, Florida
- Education: Edinburgh Academy; University of St Andrews
- Occupations: soldier land developer businessman politician
- Spouse: Blanche McDaniel Gillespie

Colonel John Hamilton Gillespie (14 October 1852 – 7 September 1923) was a Scottish-American soldier, land developer, businessman and politician, who settled in Sarasota, Florida, becoming Sarasota's first mayor.

== Biography ==
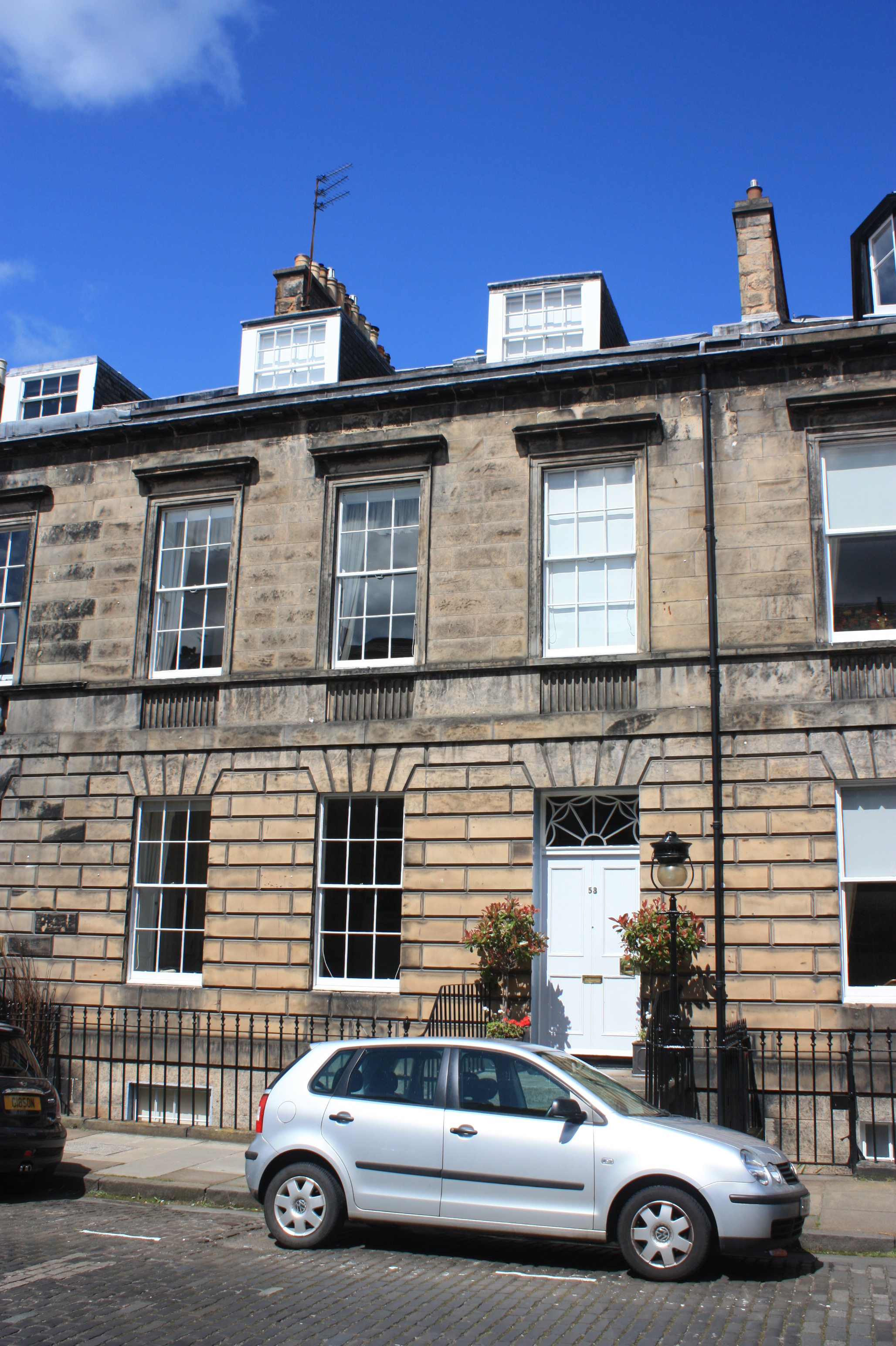
53 Northumberland Street, Edinburgh

Gillespie was born in Edinburgh, Scotland. As a boy he lived with his family at 53 Northumberland Street, Edinburgh and was educated at the nearby Edinburgh Academy and subsequently at the University of St Andrews. Like his father, he was a member of the Royal Company of Archers. (a ceremonial unit that serves as the Sovereign's Bodyguard in Scotland). He was admitted to The Society of Writers to Her Majesty's Signet in 1875 and also served as a captain in the Midlothian Coast Artillery Volunteers. Upon his return from colonial service in Australia, his father, Sir John Gillespie, sent him to Sarasota, Florida in 1886 to work for the Florida Mortgage and Investment Company.

Gillespie found his father's company in poor condition and began improving the community in Sarasota and soon business was booming. In May 1886 he laid out two golf holes on his property. This was the first golf course in Florida and the second in the United States. An avid golfer, Gillespie learned the game at St. Andrews. Andrew became a naturalized US citizen in 1896. Sometime after he became a citizen, he would join the American and Florida Bar Association. In 1905 he built a nine-hole course on property now which is now the site of the Sarasota County Courthouse, Florida. Between 1896 and 1905, he laid out courses for Henry Plant at his hotels in Belleair, Tampa, Winter Park and Havana, Cuba. Sarasota was incorporated as a town on 14 October 1902, coincidentally Gillespie's 50th birthday, and he went on to serve as the Town's first Mayor. He was subsequently elected to five additional one-year terms. During World War I, he would serve in the Volunteer Force as a Cadet Captain in the British military losing his citizenship briefly before regaining it.

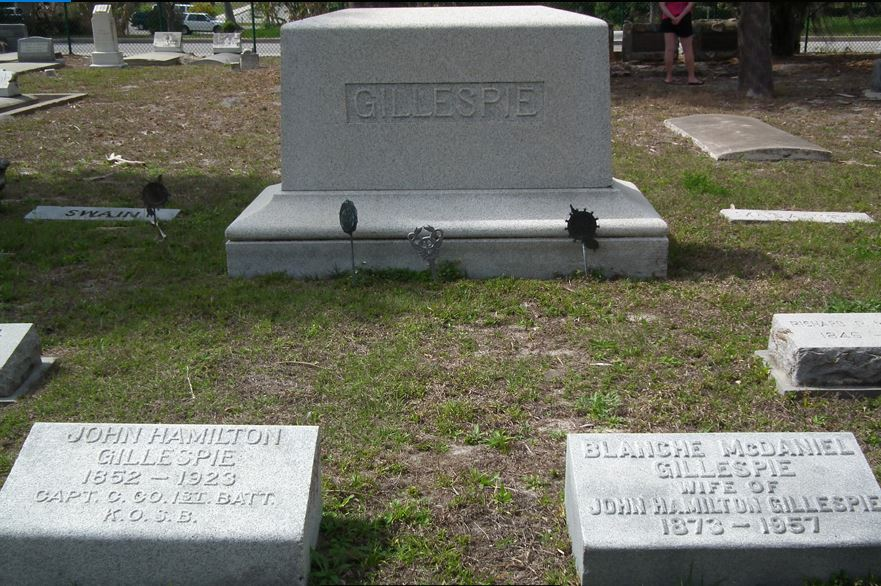
Grave of John Hamilton Gillespie in the Rosemary Cemetery, Sarasota, Fl

Gillespie was instrumental in founding the Episcopal Church in Sarasota. He was ordained as a Deacon in the Episcopal Church and is acknowledged as the founder of The Church of the Redeemer Sarasota. Gillespie was a mason being affiliated with the Knight Templar. He was part of the Independent Order of Odd Fellows and was a member of Kiwanis.

Gillespie died on a golf course near his house on September 7, 1923, and would be buried, alongside Blanche McDaniel Gillespie (his second wife), in the historic Rosemary Cemetery, Sarasota.
