= Michael Rey =

American abstract painter (born 1979)

Michael Rey (born 1979) is an American abstract painter. Born in Sarasota, Florida, Rey now lives and works in Los Angeles, California.

== Education ==
Rey received his BFA in 2002 from Ringling School of Art and Design, Sarasota, Florida, and his MFA in 2008 from the Art Center College of Design, Pasadena, CA.

== Exhibitions ==
=== Solo exhibitions ===
- Philip Martin Gallery, Los Angeles, CA, 2020
- Cherry and Martin, Los Angeles, CA, 2017
- Michael Rey, Office Baroque, Brussels, Belgium, 2017
- PLYDIS KAVE, Zero, Milan, Italy, 2016
- Michael Rey, Office Baroque, Brussels, Belgium, 2015
- About a Work #4, Zero, Milan, Italy, 2015
- OMES, Cherry and Martin, Los Angeles, CA, 2015
- Michael Rey, Cherry and Martin 2732, Los Angeles, CA, 2014
- IBJECT, Michael Rey, Room East, New York, NY, 2014
- Dracula Plus Plus, Young Art, Los Angeles, CA, 2011

=== Selected group exhibitions ===
- Group Exhibition 2017, James Fuentes Gallery, New York, NY, 2017
- Top Heavy: Jennifer Boysen, Katy Cowan, Michael Rey, Cherry and Martin, Los Angeles, CA, 2017
- Expanded Fields, Nymphius Projekte, Berlin, Germany, 2016
- Back To Basics, The Frederick R. Weisman Museum of Art, Malibu, CA, 2015
- Vom Grossen und Ganzen, Herbert Gerisch-Stiftung, Neumünster, DE, 2015
- Object Painting - Painting Object, Jonathan Viner, London, UK, 2015
- Rio (curated by Louis-Philippe Van Eeckhoutte), Office Baroque, Brussels, Belgium, 2015
- A Peg to Hang It On, White Flag Projects, St. Louis, MO, 2015
- Crunchy, Marianne Boesky Gallery, New York, NY, 2015
- Amy Feldman/Michael Rey, Freddy, Baltimore, MD, 2014
- Another Cats Show, 356 Mission, Los Angeles, CA, 2014
- Where were you?, Lisson Gallery, London, UK, 2014
- Green Circle, Black Diamond, Ratio 3, San Francisco, CA, 2014
- Hephaestus, Office Baroque, Brussels, Belgium, 2014
- Alexandre da Cunha, Michael Rey, Michael Williams, B. Wurtz, Office Baroque, Antwerp, Belgium, 2013
- Chasm of the Supernova, Center for the Arts Eagle Rock, Los Angeles, CA, 2012
- Animalfaith - Doot Doot (D.B. Sweeney), JB Jurve, Los Angeles, CA, 2010
- Ooga Booga Reading Room, Swiss Institute Contemporary Art, New York, NY, 2010
- Is What It Is What It Is, Pacific Design Center, West Hollywood, CA, 2009
- Sculpture Park, Karyn Lovegrove Gallery, Los Angeles, CA, 2009
- Cocktail Hour with Skip Arnold and Friends, Bonelli Contemporary, Los Angeles, CA, 2008
- My Buddy, UCLA New Wight Biennial, New Wight Gallery, Los Angeles, CA, 2007

== Public collections ==
- Weisman Art Museum, Minneapolis, MN
- MoMCA Trento and Reovereto, Trento, Italy
- Sabanci Museum, Istanbul, Turkey
- ADN Collection, Bolzano, Italy
- Weisman Foundation, Los Angeles, CA
- Fondazione Sandretto Re Rebaudengo, Turin, Italy
