= Florida Studio Theatre =

Theater company in Sarasota, Florida, US

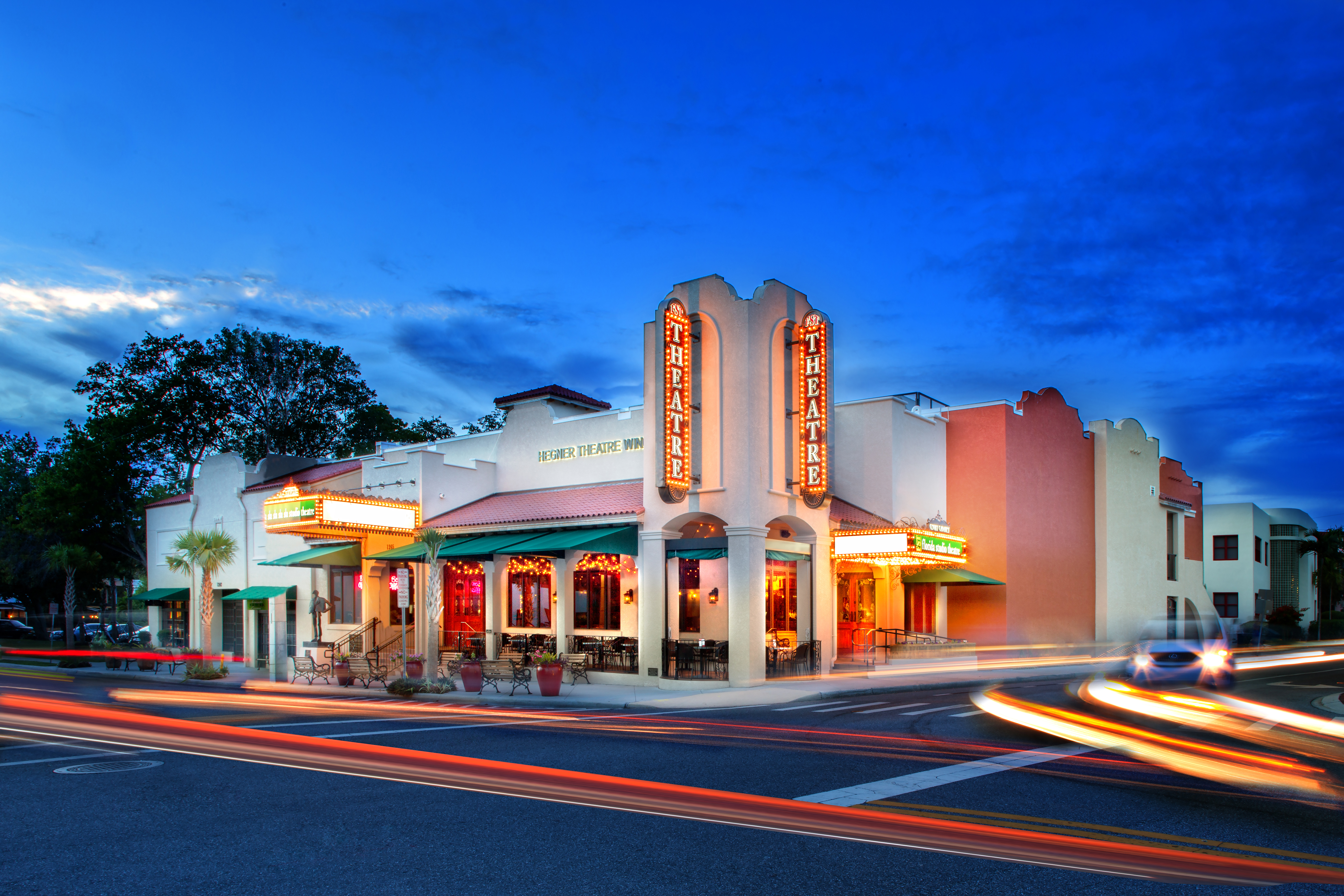
- FST's Hegner Theatre Wing Greg Wilson
- Address: 1241 North Palm Avenue
- Location: Sarasota, Florida
- Type: Theatre
- Public transit: Sarasota County Area Transit

Construction
- Opened: 1973

Website
- floridastudiotheatre.org

Florida Studio Theatre (FST) is a professional, non-profit theater company located in Sarasota, Florida that represents one of the major cultural institutions in the Gulf Coast region. Founded in 1973 as a touring troupe, FST is currently a regional theatre specializing in contemporary work and a member of the League of Resident Theatres. According to the Theatre Communications Group, it is the third largest subscription theatre in the country. Each year, more than 225,000 attendees are served by the theatre's diverse programs including the Mainstage Series, Cabaret Series, Stage III, Children's Theatre, The FST School, New Play Development, and FST Improv.

FST consists of five theatre spaces: The Keating Theatre, the Gompertz Theatre, Goldstein Cabaret, John C. Court Cabaret, and Bowne's Lab Theatre. All of the spaces are located in a two-block radius in downtown Sarasota, along with production facilities and administration offices.

== History ==
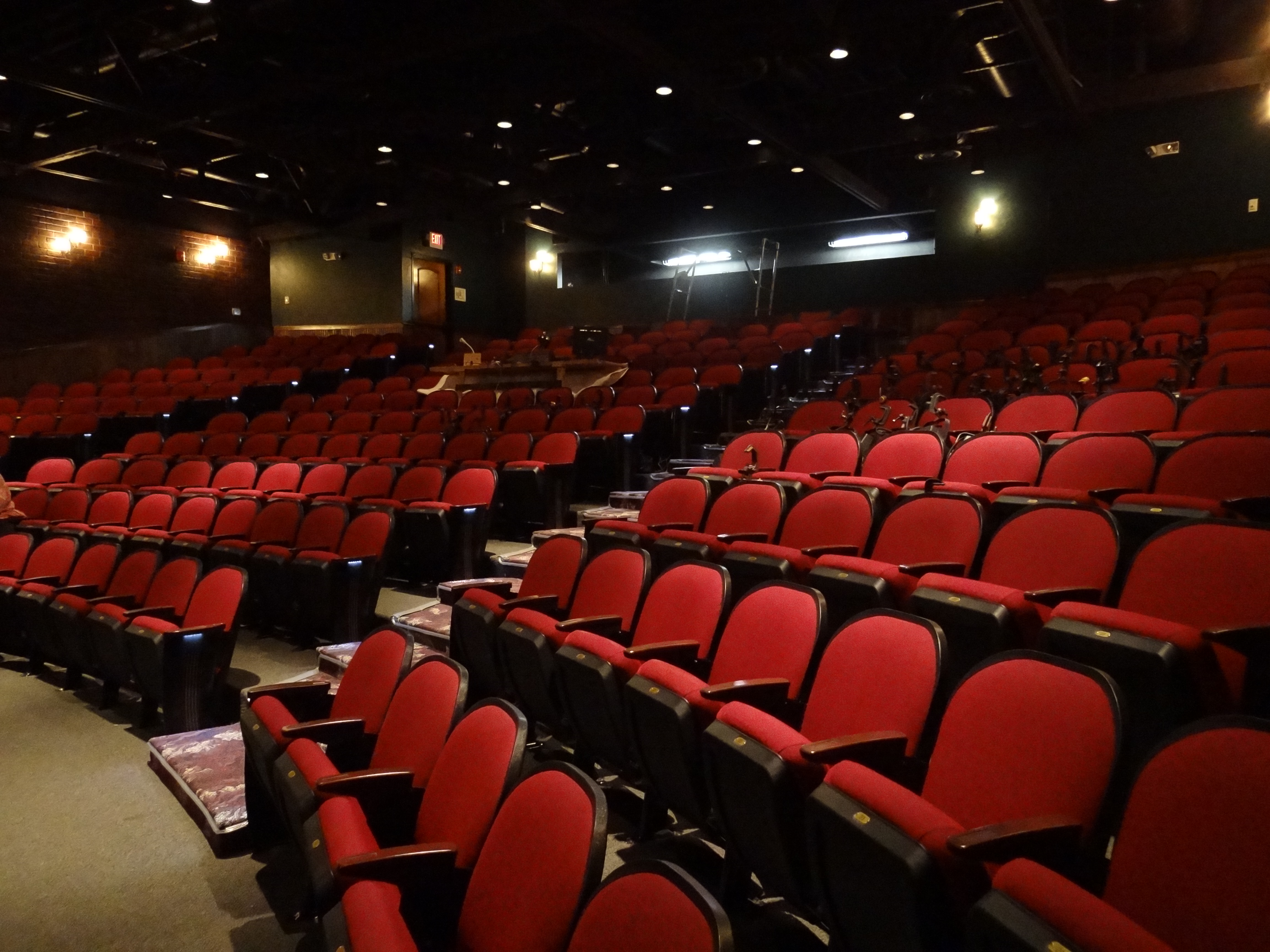
FST's Gompertz Theatre, one of its Mainstage performance spaces

=== Keating Theatre ===
Florida Studio Theatre was founded in 1973 by Jon Spelman as an alternative touring company during the height of the American regional theatre movement. Originally presenting plays in migrant camps and prisons, it was established as a resident theatre in 1980 when Richard Hopkins, an actor at Asolo Repertory Theatre, was named the artistic director. It spent the next three years in various locations before moving into the former Sarasota Woman's Club, one of Sarasota's oldest surviving buildings, in 1983.

Founded in 1913, the Sarasota Woman's Club started as a meeting of 63 charter members on April 14, 1913. In 1914, Sarasota was incorporated as a city and after two years of club activities, the cornerstone was laid at their new clubhouse at the corner of Cocoanut and Palm on January 1, 1915. When the club relocated, the building became slated for demolition. It was purchased by Marian McKenna and later sold to Florida Studio Theatre. In 1985, it was added to the U.S. National Register of Historic Places.

The building became home to the Keating Theatre. It originally seated 72 people, while today the capacity is at 173. It is home to FST's Main Stage Series and Children's Theatre. While the education department was launched in 1982, the institution's signature Write-a-Play program was developed in 1991. This program was designed to encourage students from kindergarten to high school to engage in playwriting and receives over 2,000 submissions per year. The program culminates with the Young Playwright's Festival which includes a full staging of the winning entries. Past participants have come from as far as Russia, Scotland, Italy, and Israel.

The Keating also hosts the Sarasota Festival of New Plays. Edward Albee spoke at the festival six times, lecturing on "art, politics, and commitment" in 1997. That same year, then-mayor Gene Pillot proclaimed May as Florida Studio Theatre Write A Play Month.

=== Cabaret ===
Florida Studio Theatre began offering cabaret performances in local restaurants in the 1980s and by 1995 it had opened a space for its own cabaret season. Originally called the Cabaret Club, it was renamed Goldstein Cabaret in 2003 in honor of Alan and Alfred Goldstein and became the first theatre on the FST campus dedicated to musical cabaret performance. Performances typically consist of song selections based around a central theme. The theatre has been home to over 71 productions, beginning with a production titled The Jazz Club and more recently, The Wonder Years: The Music of the Baby Boomers in 2019.

The cabaret space has a seating capacity of 100 and has a subscription base of over 8,000 people. There is a bar adjoining the space that offers in-theatre dining.

In 2012, FST broke ground on a new facility that would come to be known as the Hegner Theatre Wing. Included in the complex was the John C. Court Cabaret, a second space for original musical reviews. It opened in 2013. It was named in memory of FST board member Georgia Court's late husband, John Court. It also serves as a venue for the Jazz Club of Sarasota and has hosted notable jazz musicians such as Dominick Farinacci.

=== Hegner Theatre Wing ===
In 2003, FST purchased the building that would eventually become the Gompertz Theatre. Originally a movie theater in the 1920s, the Great Depression caused the theatre to close. But by the 1940s, the theatre reopened and hosted a variety of road shows and performances. In 1951, the theatre was known at the Palm Tree Playhouse, but it closed again in the 1960s and spent the next decade mostly dormant.

In the mid-1970s, Asolo Repertory Theatre purchased the space for production purposes and second stage performances before selling it to Anita Katzman. It was then reoccupied by Siesta Key Actors Theatre followed by TheatreWorks Sarasota in the 1980s before again falling dormant. The building was acquired by Florida Studio Theatre and renamed the Gompertz Theatre in honor of Leila Gompertz, who made the lead gift enabling the purchase. In 2012 the space went under significant renovations. A $5.8 million dollar renovation culminated in a completely refurbished stage as part of the multi-theater Hegner Theatre Wing. The Gompertz currently seats 237 while serving as a host of FST's Main Stage productions. Along with the Keating, it is also utilized for the Burdick New Play Festival.

The third performance space in the complex is Bowne's Lab Theatre. It was named for one of John Court's ancestors, John Bowne. Opening in 2014, the lab space hosts the Stage III series which is reserved for experimental productions or plays with darker material. Past productions have included The Goat, or Who Is Sylvia?, Hand to God, and The Nether. Bowne's is also the host of FST's Improv program and home improvisational theatre team.

== Notable productions ==
- Unchained Melodies (2019) by Richard Hopkins and Rebecca Hopkins with arrangements by Jim Prosse. Broke record for the most attendees (over 20,000).
- Honor Killing (2018) by Sarah Bierstock, a world premiere, was featured in FST’s 2017 Burdick New Play Reading Series before being produced in 2018.
- Blue Suede Shoes (2018) by Richard Hopkins and Rebecca Hopkins with arrangements by Jim Prosse. Broke records for FST's longest-running production, with 191 performances.
- Relativity (2016) by Mark St. Germain, a world premiere as part of the National New Play Network' rolling world premiere program. FST commissioned St. Germain to write the play in 2015.
- Fly (2015) by Trey Ellis & Ricardo Khan. A regional premiere production took place before its Off-Broadway debut at The Public Theater in 2016.
- Race (2011) by David Mamet
- Black Pearl Sings! (2009) – FST's production led to the show being one of the most produced in the 2009-2010 season.
- Metamorphoses (2004)
- Smokey Joe's Café (1999) - FST is the first regional theatre in the United States to produce this show while it is still running on Broadway and on national tour.
- Invasion of Privacy (1999) by Larry Parr
