= Fredd Atkins =

American politician (born 1952)

Personal details
- Born: June 19, 1952 (age 74) Sarasota, Florida, U.S.
- Party: Democratic

Fredd Atkins, born June 19, 1952, is a former mayor and the first African American mayor of Sarasota, Florida. He served as a city commissioner of Sarasota for 18 years and also ran for Sarasota County Commissioner. Atkins ran for the Sarasota County Commission in 2022 and lost with 49.5% of the vote to Mark Smith, who won with 50.5%.

== History ==
Atkins grew up in the community of Newtown in Sarasota, Florida.
