= Rosemary Cemetery =

Cemetery in Florida, USA

- U.S. National Register of Historic Places
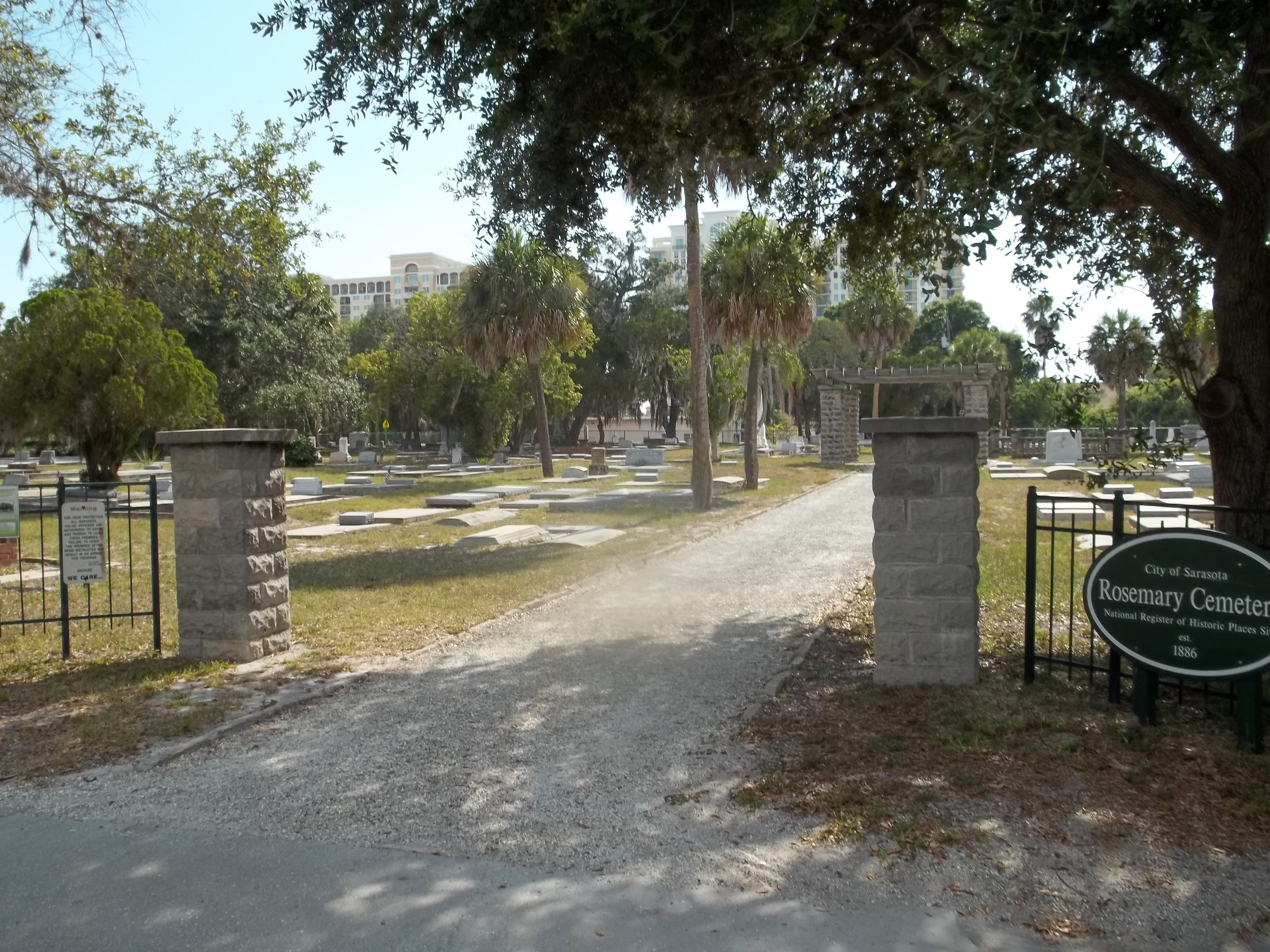

- Location within Florida Location within the United States
- Location: Sarasota, Florida
- Coordinates: 27°20′42″N 82°32′37″W
- Built: 1886
- NRHP reference No.: 03001143
- Added to NRHP: November 16, 2003

The Rosemary Cemetery is a historic cemetery in Sarasota, Florida. The cemetery is located at the northwest corner of the original plat of the town of Sarasota.

== History ==
The cemetery was acquired by the town of Sarasota in 1903. The cemetery is a significant indicator of the early settlement as it is the first public cemetery in Sarasota and the oldest extant man-made landscape feature in the city.

On November 16, 2003, it was added to the U.S. National Register of Historic Places after Uzi Baram, anthropology professor at New College of Florida and Susan Lynn White, Sarasota County Archaeologist, surveyed and documented the cemetery. The City of Sarasota updated signage for the cemetery, using Baram's suggestions as Director of the New College Public Archaeology Lab, in 2014

== Notable burials ==
- Owen Burns, businessman and community leader
- John Hamilton Gillespie, Sarasota's first mayor
