= Sarasota Woman's Club =

- U.S. National Register of Historic Places
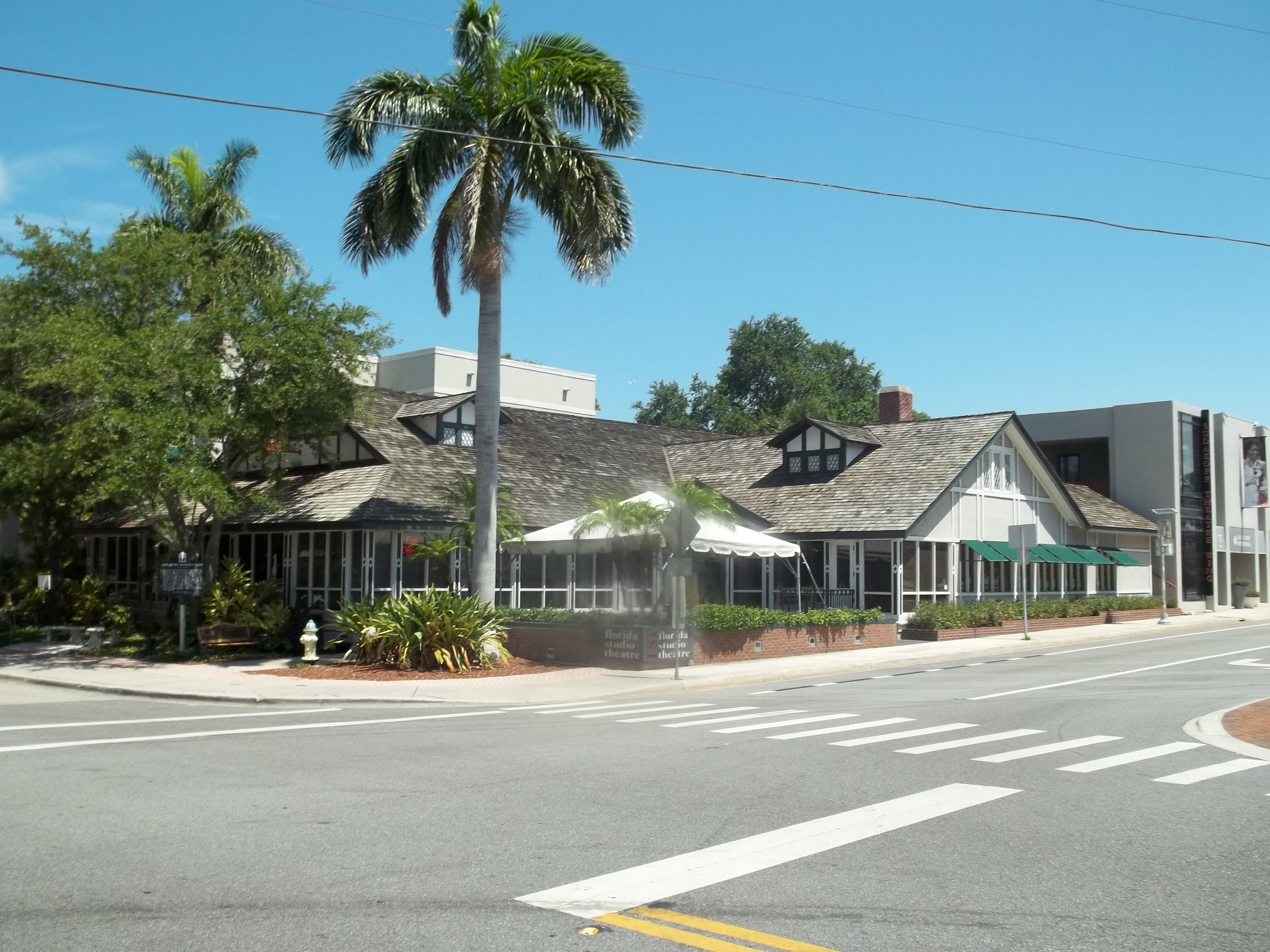

- Location within Florida Location within the United States
- Location: Sarasota, Florida
- Coordinates: 27°20′11″N 82°32′43.5″W
- Built: 1915
- Architect: G. L. Lysat and H. N. Hall
- Architectural style: Tudor Revival
- MPS: Sarasota MRA
- NRHP reference No.: 85000087
- Added to NRHP: January 18, 1985

The Sarasota Woman's Club (also known as the Florida Studio Theatre) is a historic woman's club in Sarasota, Florida. It is located at 1241 North Palm Avenue. It was founded in 1913, and on January 18, 1985, it was added to the U.S. National Register of Historic Places. The clubhouse is now home to the Keating Theater, the mainstage of Florida Studio Theatre.

== Building Origins ==
The Sarasota Woman’s Club started as a meeting of 63 charter members on April 14, 1913. In 1914 Sarasota was incorporated as a city and after two years of club activities, the cornerstone was laid at their new clubhouse at the corner of Cocoanut and Palm on January 1, 1915. As part of the ground-breaking celebrations, the first club president, Alice Guenther, gave a short speech. That year, on its second anniversary, the club had 200 members, owned a lot, and had moved into their newly built $4,500 clubhouse. Created by architect H.N. Hall and contractor George Lysat, the building is Tudor Revival.

Part of the clubhouse was dedicated to housing Sarasota’s library. The Woman’s Club kept it in operation with fundraisers until 1940, when it became public.

After 38 years of being open, the clubhouse was rededicated in 1953 after being remodeled and redecorated by Naomi Widrig, a club member. The occasion was marked by a musical number and remarks by A.B. Edwards, who had been the mayor when the club was first opened, and Mrs. Joseph Halton, the first Club vice president.

Mrs. Halton, wife of a well-respected local doctor, was among the first to act in the space that is now the main stage of the Florida Studio Theatre in a play called "Sunbonnets." "Sunbonnets" was performed first at the clubhouse (the general public could get in for $0.25 and members’ admission was free) and then transferred to the Hover Arcade Theatre for a repeat performance.

In 1977, the same year it became the home of the Florida Studio Theatre, the clubhouse received Historical Site status with the presentation of a Historical Marker.

== Response to the Woman’s Club ==
In response to the newly founded Woman’s Club, the Sarasota Sun conducted a poll asking a few “prominent citizens” their opinion of the new organization. Then-Mayor Higel praised the Woman’s Club saying, “Best move ever made here. More attention is given to their orders issued than to those of any other body.” Other government officials reacted differently, with Marshall Hodge reported to have said, “The Woman’s Club is all right, but I have troubles of my own,” with City Clerk Houle adding, “It’s a terror to the men.”

In the same Sarasota Sun article, the husband of the president of the club, Mrs. Alice Gunther, said, “A great institution for the town, but hard on the individual in my case, as I expect to be buttonless, sockless, and half-fed for the next year.” In a similar vein, Sarasota resident Walter P. Bryan offered his opinion, “I have been married so recently I dare not say what I think.”

On the whole, the foundation of the Woman’s Club was seen as a good thing for the community. Sarasota resident J.W. Madison admired the women of the club, saying of the club’s formation, “Good thing! The Woman’s Club always takes the advanced position in civics and so forth.” J.J. Merrill added, “Of invaluable assistance to the city, morally and physically.” W.T. Caven observed, “Every city that has been blessed with a woman’s club has been the one to show greater progress in its culture and municipal worth.”

== Woman’s Club Activities ==
The Sarasota Woman’s Club originated as the Town Improvement Society, an organization of women founded in 1903. Their first project was to have sidewalks built along Main Street, where previously there had been sand paths. They continued on to install lanterns at the train station and organize the first community library.

The Florida land boom in 1919 and the increasing political awakening of women in Florida from 1890 to 1920 during the Progressive Era paved the way for women to become more socially active. The Woman’s Club succeeded the Town Improvement Society and in many areas picked up where they left off. Their Library Committee, Cemetery Committee, Juvenile Dancing Class, Education Committee, music committees, and welfare committees ensured that within four years of the founding of the Sarasota Woman’s Club, they became a social center. In 1913 the Woman’s Club took over care of the library and started improvements on Rosemary Cemetery, which had fallen into disrepair. They also created a community work day “during which businesses were closed by order of the mayor and more than 200 men with teams and wagons created a park along the bay front between Main Street and the Seaboard Air Line Railroad (now Ringling Boulevard).” The following year, they initiated a census and birth registration and planted 250 coconut trees along the shore. In 1915, ensconced in their new clubhouse, the Woman’s Club investigated better ways for parents to save on sending their children to school. They also sold Tuberculosis seals. Matters of health were big that year, with a speaker at the club addressing its members on the subject of health reform:

Vital statistics and the prevalence of disease is awakening all Club women to the need of a reform on the lines of health purity, and very deeply did this lady feel on the subject that a broader education should be given the young people on the question of health and a one standard of morality maintained.

1917 and 1918 saw a continued effort on behalf of school-age children. Club members founded the area PTA, campaigned for compulsory school attendance, and organized the Red Cross Auxiliary and training classes for elementary school students.

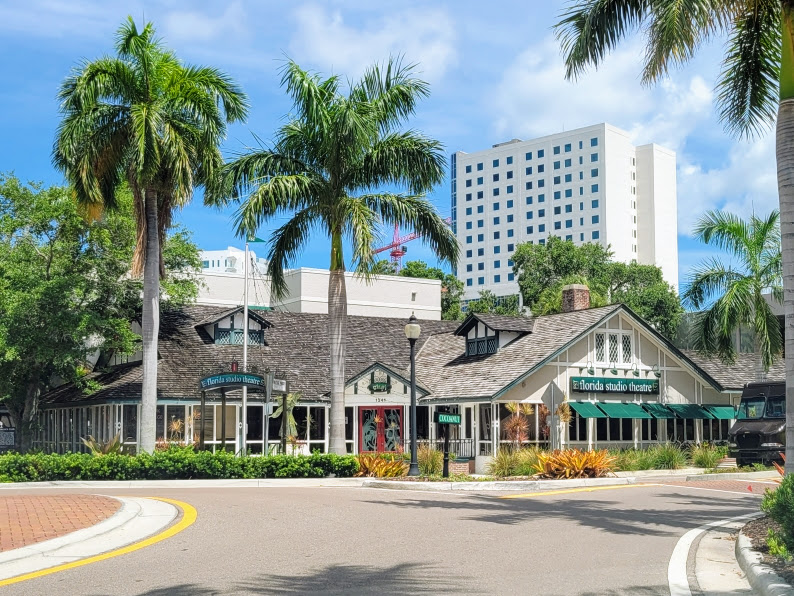
Sarasota Woman's Club in July 2022

In 1917, sixty-one members of the Woman’s Club registered in the lobby of the First National Bank to help the war effort in whatever capacity they could. Registration included writing down any and all skills to be recorded and put on file. A call for other women to participate in this wartime registration appeared in the Saratimes. "Well," said one resident female worker in the article (which was entitled “Attention Women! Are You a Patriot or a Slacker?”), “nobody plays a band for you when you go out to swat flies. Much of the work will be inglorious—but grimly necessary. A right to share in the glorious results accomplished should be compensation enough.”

During the 1920/1921 season Woman’s Club members raised money for a local hospital, registered to vote, and joined the FFWC (Florida Federation of Women’s Clubs) and GFWC (General Federation of Women's Clubs). The FFWC was most successful in their conservation projects, in particular their efforts to halt deforestation in the Everglades. The club continued in this vein of philanthropic work, founding the Helen R. Payne Day Care Nursery in 1938 as a service for the children of migrant workers and even adopting a needy child in France, for whom they then raised money and sent care packages.

Today, the Woman’s Club supports the following state and national projects: Canine Companions for Independence, Special Olympics, R.O.C.K. Camp and Bogg Creek Camp, HOBY, Hacienda Girls Ranch, and the Everglades National Park, initially established by the FFWC as Royal Palm Park.

Local philanthropies the club currently assists include: the Sarasota County Library, a scholarship fund for deserving students, continued work with the Helen R. Payne Day Care Nursery, Oak Park School, The Pines of Sarasota, the American Cancer Society, Genesis Dental Clinic, and the Sarasota Women’s Legal Fund.

The Woman’s Club of Sarasota currently supports the following organizations with donations: Safe Place Rape Crisis Center, All Faiths Food Bank, Resurrection House, Sarasota County Child Health Center, and Bay Pines Veterans Hospital.

== Seasons and Functions ==
The Woman’s Club divided their calendar years into themed seasons. Each year, the club announced the season to come in a statement issued by the planning committee.

In 1914 the Woman’s Club sponsored a mock court trial. In 1921 they held a round table discussion entitled “The Censorship of the Movies.” In 1924 Princess Cantacuzene addressed club members and visitors in a speech responding to Admiral Bradley A. Fiske’s statement that “of all existing matters, the one women understood the least, is war.” She used the club as a positive example of effective social change by women. The princess concluded that the admiral’s instruction that women "butt out" is misguided.

The club would frequently host themed evenings, often costume shows. In 1916, a Mother Goose themed party raised the most funds of the year at $378.28. The 1919 Colonial Ball found between fifty and sixty couples—club members and their guests—taking part in the ball’s Grand March and taking home Colonial hats as party favors. A hat show presented in 1950 was followed by a skit entitled “The Lizzie Dash-It Hat Shoppe” written by club member Mrs. Charles Wise. At evenings such as that, the club song would be sung as part of the festivities.

The 1959/1960 season’s themes were “Investment in Understanding” and “Through wisdom is an (sic) house builded (sic) and by understanding is it established.” The series opened on November 2, 1959 with a lecture by Dr. Alfred P. Haake, a businessman, titled “America Unlimited.” The season continued with book reviews, a demonstration by cartoonist Six Hix of Chicago, a performance of the Christmas play The Gift Supreme, talks, lectures, an art history presentation, and a seminar on business tips for women.

All money raised that was not put back into the club for day-to-day expenses was given back to the town, or to state work, or to other philanthropies.

== Mantras and Publicity ==
To keep the public up to date on goings-on at the club, the Woman’s Club published weekly notes in The Sarasota Times, which was founded in 1899 as Sarasota’s first newspaper.

The Sarasota Woman’s Club functioned under several codes of conduct. They published their constitution and by-laws in The Sarasota Times just after their founding in 1913. In addition to these rules, the club espoused a mantra called the “Brighten Up Rules”: That the Woman’s Club believes in.

To Brighten Up myself—to be optimistic, cheerful and good… To Brighten Up my home and spread the Brighten Up spirit among my neighbors. To Brighten Up my business and take pleasure as well as profit from it. To Brighten Up my town and promote its social, Industrial and commercial progress. To promote the love of Nature sunshine and fresh air. To adopt Brighten Up as my slogan.

In addition, the Woman’s Club took as inspiration a poem originally published in the Southern Woman’s Magazine entitled “What is a Woman’s Club?”:

What is a woman’s club? A meeting ground, For those whose purpose, great and broad and strong, Whose aim is like the star: who ever long To make the patient, hastening world resound With sweeter music, freer tones. A place where kindly, lifting words are said. And kindlier deeds are done: where hearts are fed. Where wealth of brain for poverty atones: Where hand grasps hand: and soul finds touch with soul: Where victors in the race for fame and power Look back in their triumphant hour To beckon others to the shining goal, This is a woman’s club—a heaven fair, Where toilers drop—an hour—their load of care.

== The Club Today ==
Today, the Sarasota Woman’s Club continues to host seasonal events to benefit a variety of local and national charities. In addition to the original Sarasota club body, the Golden City Woman’s Club of Sarasota was founded in 1962 to serve Sarasota County.

Florida Studio Theatre (FST) now operates out of the old clubhouse at 1241 North Palm Avenue, as well as adjacent buildings. In 1976, FST founder Jon Spelman saw a potential performance space in the clubhouse, which, at that time, was vacant and in need of serious repair. Patron of the arts Marian McKenna, whose fond memories of the clubhouse included receiving her first kiss on the premises, purchased the old building from Boomhauer Realty and sold it to FST at a greatly reduced price. Under the ownership of FST, the clubhouse has undergone extensive renovation and beautification, while still maintaining the exterior look and structure of the original building.

Over the past 40 years, FST has established itself as a major force in American Theatre. Today, the Sarasota Women’s Club building features the fully operational 173-seat Keating Theatre, one of FST's two Mainstage performance spaces. FST’s Keating Theatre is the cornerstone of FST’s village of 5 theatres, serving more than 230,000 live attendees each year.
