= Erik Arroyo =

American lawyer and politician

Erik J. Arroyo
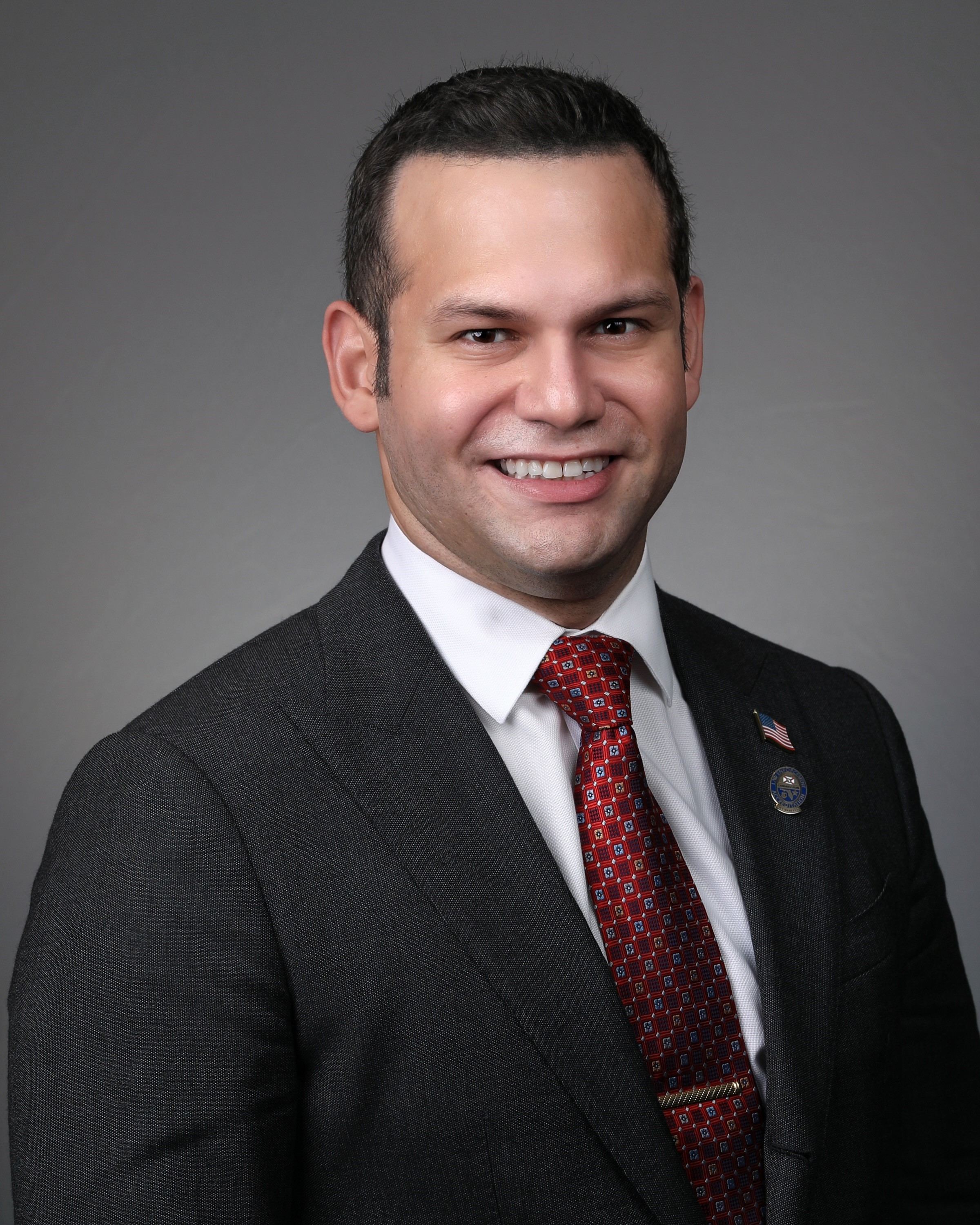

Mayor of Sarasota

Personal details
- Education: University of Florida (BA) Florida A&M University College of Law (JD)

Erik Jhoan Arroyo is an American lawyer and Republican politician. He became the youngest and first Hispanic Mayor in the history of Sarasota, Florida. He is a member of the Council on Foreign Relations.

== Early life and education ==
Arroyo was born in Dominican Republic and emigrated to the United States as a teenager to join his mother. He graduated from Riverview High School and attended the University of Florida, where he earned a degree in political science. He got his Juris Doctor from Florida A&M University College of Law.

== Career ==
Mayor of Sarasota

Arroyo became the youngest and first Hispanic Mayor in the history of Sarasota, Florida. As Mayor, he suggested prioritizing cuts over drawing down reserves to balance the city's $252.18 million budget. Arroyo led an initiative for annexation of the barrier island of Siesta Key into the city of Sarasota, which the city commission approved for further consideration. Arroyo has been an advocate for a regional alley beautification program. In 2022, Governor Ron DeSantis appointed Mayor Arroyo to the CareerSource Florida Board of Directors.

Mayor Arroyo expressed support for Ukraine during the 2022 Russia Invasion of Ukraine. In 2021, Mayor Arroyo gave the key to the city to sports celebrity Royce Gracie and declared December 12 as "Royce Gracie Day." He was also a member of the Sarasota chess team in an international chess match against Tel Mond, Israel, which was published by the United States Chess Federation.

City Commissioner & Vice Mayor

During his first day in elected office, Arroyo initiated a discussion on the future of the city manager's employment. Arroyo was voted unanimously by the Sarasota city commission as the city's Vice Mayor. During the COVID-19 pandemic, Arroyo proposed a city-wide moratorium on utility suspensions for unpaid accounts during the winter months, which was ultimately approved by the city commission. He also advocated for a ban on animal kill shelters in Sarasota.

Candidacy for Florida House of Representatives

Arroyo ran for election to the Florida House of Representatives to represent District 72. Arroyo withdrew from the Florida house race and ran for the Sarasota city commission.
