= Geoff Wilson (card collector) =

American entrepreneur (born 1978)

- Born: 26 November 1978 (age 47); Sarasota, Florida
- Education: University of Florida
- Occupations: Entrepreneur, investor, and content creator
- Employer: Sports Card Investor
- Known for: sports card collector
- Title: Founder
- Children: 3
- Website: geoffwilson.com

Geoff Wilson (born 26 November 1978), is an American entrepreneur, investor, and content creator known for his work in the sports card collecting industry.

== Early life and education ==
Wilson’s first job was working at a sports card store in Sarasota, Florida, at age 14.

Wilson had a background in digital marketing and entrepreneurship. He has founded and operated several businesses in the technology and digital space, though he became widely known for his role in the resurgence of interest in sports card collecting. Wilson attended University of Florida.

== Career ==
=== Sports Card Investor ===
In 2019, Wilson founded Sports Card Investor, a platform dedicated to educating and informing both new and seasoned sports card collectors and investors. The website and accompanying YouTube channel focus on the financial aspects of the sports card hobby, treating it as an alternative investment opportunity. Wilson's content often features market trends, investment tips, and analysis of the sports card industry.

Through Sports Card Investor, Wilson provides a wide range of tools and resources, including a market pricing data tool that tracks the values of sports cards, offering collectors and investors up-to-date information on market fluctuations. His platform aims to bring transparency and insight to a growing community of collectors looking to navigate the evolving market.

In February, 2024, Wilson opened one of the largest card shops in the world, CardsHQ, in Atlanta, Georgia. The Sports Card Investor studio is now located inside of CardsHQ.

=== Books ===
In April 2024, Wilson signed a book deal with John Wiley & Sons to author the book Sports Card Collecting & Investing for Dummies.

=== Trading Card ===
In April 2023, Topps created a card of Wilson and included it in their 2023 Big League Baseball set. The card, which is card number HI-GW, is part of the Hobby Influencer Short Prints Inserts.

== YouTube and media presence ==
Wilson also serves as the host of the Sports Card Investor YouTube channel, where he regularly posts videos on card investments, market updates, and interviews with industry experts. His channel has attracted a large following, becoming a go-to source for collectors looking to make informed decisions in the buying and selling of sports cards. His content often blends the worlds of sports and finance, appealing to both hobbyists and investors alike.

== Personal life ==
Wilson is married to Kim, an entrepreneur who founded Social News Desk, a social media management software for television newsrooms, which was acquired by Graham Holdings in 2014. They have 3 children named Reaves, Harrison, and Emilia Wilson, who often appear in Sports Card Investor videos, and they also have their own YouTube channel called Card Kids, where they produce videos about trading and collecting cards. Wilson continues to be involved in other business ventures in addition to his focus on the sports card industry.
