= Sarasota, Florida =

- City
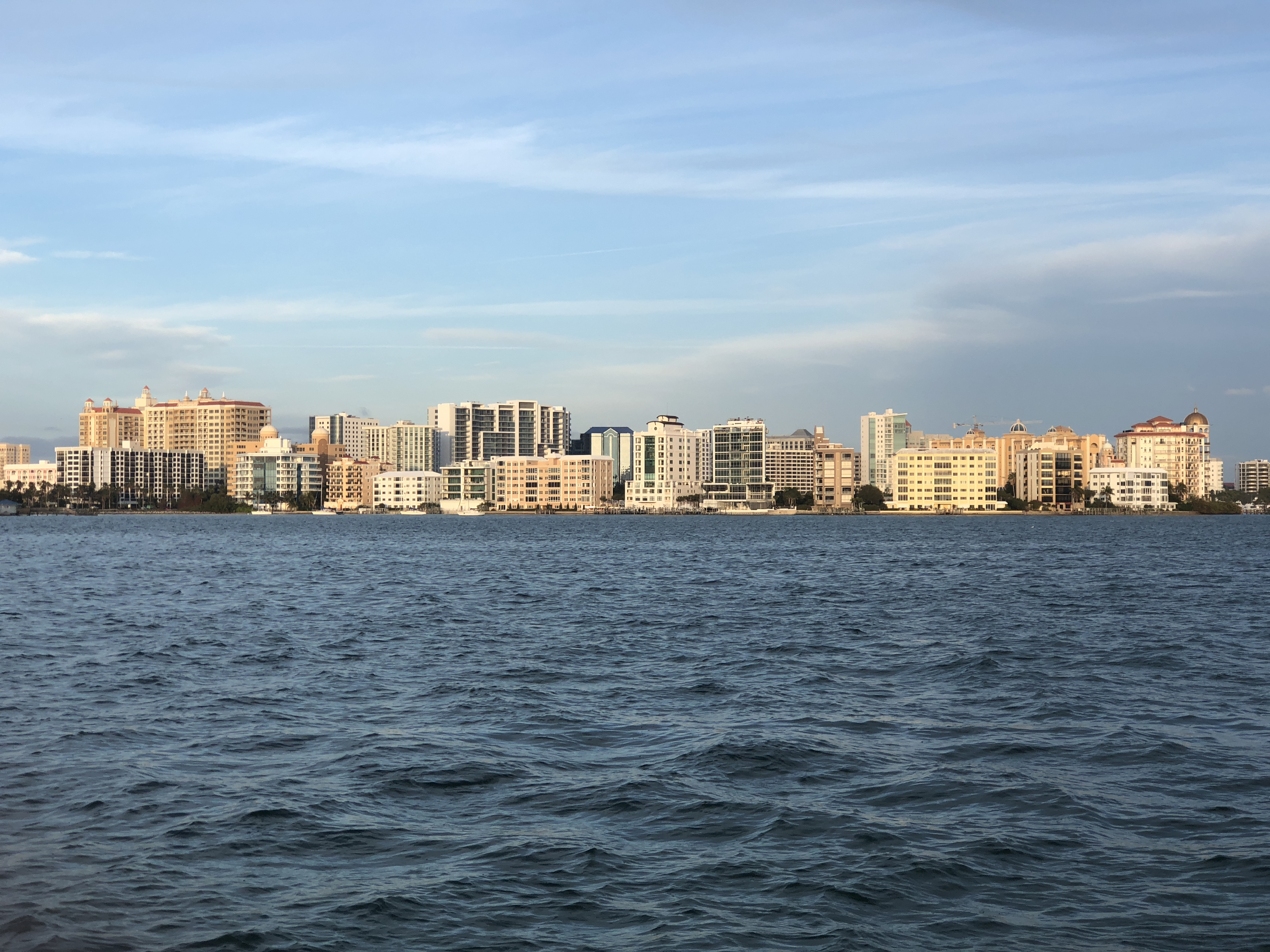
- Skyline of Sarasota from Bird Key in 2018

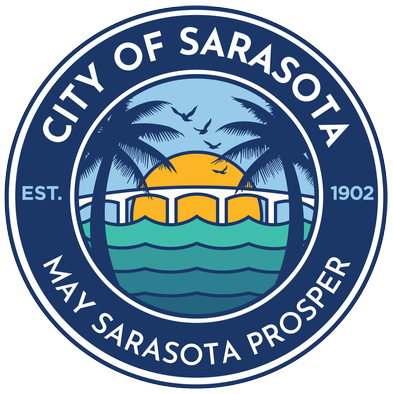
- Flag Seal
- Nicknames: Paradise, SRQ, Circus City
- Mottoes: "May Sarasota Prosper", "Where Urban Amenities Meet Small-Town Living"
- Interactive map of Sarasota, Florida
- Location within the state of Florida Location within the United States
- Coordinates: 27°20′11″N 82°32′34″W
- Country: United States
- State: Florida
- County: Sarasota
- Incorporated: October 14, 1902 (town); May 13, 1913 (city)

Government
  - Type: Commission–manager
  - Mayor: Debbie Trice
  - City manager: David Bullock (interim)

Area
  - City: 24.09 sq mi (62.38 km^{2})
  - Land: 14.70 sq mi (38.07 km^{2})
  - Water: 9.39 sq mi (24.31 km^{2}) 42.58%
- Elevation: 20 ft (6.1 m)

Population (2020)
  - City: 54,842
  - Estimate (2025): 58,458
  - Density: 3,731.5/sq mi (1,440.74/km^{2})
  - Urban: 779,075 (US: 57th)
  - Urban density: 1,930/sq mi (744/km^{2})
  - Metro: 833,716 (US: 71st)
  - Metro density: 542/sq mi (209/km^{2})
- Time zone: UTC−5 (EST)
  - Summer (DST): UTC−4 (EDT)
- ZIP codes: 34230–34243, 34249, 34260, 34276-34277
- Area code: 941
- FIPS code: 12-64175
- GNIS feature ID: 2405423
- Website: www.sarasotafl.gov

Sarasota (/ˌsærəˈsoʊtə/) is a city in and the county seat of Sarasota County, Florida, United States. It is located in Southwest Florida on Sarasota Bay, a lagoon on the Gulf Coast. The population was 54,842 at the 2020 census. The two-county Sarasota metropolitan area has an estimated 935,000 residents, making it the fifth-largest metropolitan area in Florida and 61st-largest in the United States.

The Sarasota area was explored by the Spanish in the 16th century, and was settled by American William Henry Whitaker in the mid-19th century. Sarasota's development accelerated in the late 19th and early 20th centuries, particularly with the influence of Bertha Honore Palmer and the Ringling family as the home of Ringling Bros. and Barnum & Bailey Circus. The city's economy is based on tourism, healthcare, education, and real estate. Its cultural attractions include the John and Mable Ringling Museum of Art, Sarasota Opera, and numerous galleries and theaters. Sarasota city limits contain several barrier islands between Sarasota Bay and the Gulf of Mexico, including Lido Key, St. Armands Key, Bird Key, and the northern portion of Siesta Key. Its coastline, including nearby Siesta Beach, draws visitors year-round.

== Etymology ==
The origin of the name is disputed and has given rise to several theories. Two theories involve Hernando de Soto's visit to the area in 1539. One holds that he named it after his daughter, Sara; however, he had no children. George F. Chapline created this story in 1906, including an ill-fated romance between Sara and a Seminole prince, Chichi Okobee. Another holds that it was named "Zara Soto", Arabic for the "Radiance of Soto". Other theories take into account the substantial beaches and indigenous mounds, with early Spanish explorers being reminded of the Sahara, combined with "zota", the indigenous word for "blue waters". Others claim that it comes from "sara-de-cota", meaning "an area of land easily observed" in the language of the Calusa indigenous tribe.

The area known today as Sarasota appeared on a sheepskin Spanish map from 1763 with the word Zarazote over present-day Sarasota and Bradenton. In 1776, a British map by Bernard Romans lists a "Boca Sarasota" in the local area. Maps in the 1700s showed the area as "Sarazota" or "Porte Sarasote". A fishing camp and trading post on Longboat Key was also called "Saraxota". The name Sarasota appears on the first maps of the state of Florida in 1839, after having passed into the ownership of the United States.

People from Sarasota are generally known as "Sarasotans".

== History ==
Around 1883 to 1885, The Florida Mortgage and Investment Company of Edinburgh bought 60,000 acres (240 km^{2}) for development in what is now Sarasota. Many Scottish people began to arrive in Sarasota in December 1885. The municipal government of Sarasota was established when it was incorporated as a town on October 14, 1902. John Hamilton Gillespie was the first Mayor of the town government. When reincorporated with a city form of government on May 13, 1913, A. B. Edwards became the first mayor of the city government.

The city limits expanded significantly with the real estate rush of the early twentieth century, reaching almost 70 square miles (180 km^{2}). The speculation boom began to crash in 1926 and the city limits began to contract, shrinking to less than a quarter of that area.

== Geography ==
=== Climate ===
Sarasota has a humid subtropical climate (Koppen Cfa) with hot, humid summers and cooler, milder winters. The high temperatures and high humidity in the summer regularly push the heat index over 100 °F (38 °C). There are distinct rainy and dry seasons, with the rainy season lasting from March to November and the dry season from December to February. According to the U.S. Census Bureau, the city has a total area of 24.08 square miles (62.4 km^{2}), of which 14.70 sq mi (38.07 km^{2}) is land and 9.39 sq mi (24.3 km^{2}) is water.

The Gulf Intracoastal Waterway is the name given to the many natural deep water sections as well as humanmade channels, canals, and cuts that link the entire Sarasota Bay system.

Climate data for Sarasota, Florida (Sarasota–Bradenton International Airport), 1991–2020 normals, extremes 1911–present
Month	Jan	Feb	Mar	Apr	May	Jun	Jul	Aug	Sep	Oct	Nov	Dec	Year
Record high °F (°C)	91 (33)	90 (32)	91 (33)	96 (36)	98 (37)	100 (38)	101 (38)	101 (38)	98 (37)	99 (37)	92 (33)	90 (32)	101 (38)
Mean maximum °F (°C)	82.6 (28.1)	83.6 (28.7)	86.1 (30.1)	89.7 (32.1)	93.4 (34.1)	94.9 (34.9)	95.2 (35.1)	95.3 (35.2)	94.0 (34.4)	91.3 (32.9)	87.2 (30.7)	83.6 (28.7)	96.6 (35.9)
Mean daily maximum °F (°C)	72.5 (22.5)	74.9 (23.8)	78.2 (25.7)	82.5 (28.1)	87.5 (30.8)	90.0 (32.2)	91.1 (32.8)	91.5 (33.1)	90.2 (32.3)	86.3 (30.2)	80.0 (26.7)	75.2 (24.0)	83.3 (28.5)
Daily mean °F (°C)	62.4 (16.9)	64.8 (18.2)	68.1 (20.1)	72.6 (22.6)	77.8 (25.4)	81.8 (27.7)	83.1 (28.4)	83.4 (28.6)	82.2 (27.9)	77.3 (25.2)	70.1 (21.2)	65.2 (18.4)	74.1 (23.4)
Mean daily minimum °F (°C)	52.3 (11.3)	54.6 (12.6)	58.1 (14.5)	62.7 (17.1)	68.2 (20.1)	73.6 (23.1)	75.2 (24.0)	75.3 (24.1)	74.1 (23.4)	68.3 (20.2)	60.1 (15.6)	55.2 (12.9)	64.8 (18.2)
Mean minimum °F (°C)	33.9 (1.1)	37.5 (3.1)	42.5 (5.8)	49.2 (9.6)	58.6 (14.8)	68.3 (20.2)	70.3 (21.3)	71.7 (22.1)	68.1 (20.1)	55.3 (12.9)	44.9 (7.2)	38.9 (3.8)	32.3 (0.2)
Record low °F (°C)	23 (−5)	21 (−6)	30 (−1)	37 (3)	45 (7)	52 (11)	62 (17)	60 (16)	58 (14)	40 (4)	27 (−3)	20 (−7)	20 (−7)
Average precipitation inches (mm)	2.79 (71)	1.92 (49)	2.85 (72)	2.46 (62)	2.58 (66)	7.05 (179)	7.39 (188)	9.11 (231)	6.00 (152)	2.76 (70)	1.81 (46)	2.33 (59)	49.05 (1,246)
Average precipitation days (≥ 0.01 in)	8.5	6.8	6.4	5.1	6.0	12.8	15.6	17.5	13.7	7.0	5.6	7.6	112.6
Source: NOAA

== Demographics ==
Historical population
Census	Pop.	Note	%±
1910	840		—
1920	2,149		155.8%
1930	8,398		290.8%
1940	11,141		32.7%
1950	18,896		69.6%
1960	34,083		80.4%
1970	40,237		18.1%
1980	48,868		21.5%
1990	50,961		4.3%
2000	52,715		3.4%
2010	51,917		−1.5%
2020	54,842		5.6%
2025 (est.)	58,458		6.6%

=== Racial and ethnic composition ===
Sarasota racial composition (Hispanics excluded from racial categories) (NH = Non-Hispanic)
Race	Pop 2010	Pop 2020	% 2010	% 2020
White (NH)	34,052	34,575	65.59%	63.04%
Black or African American (NH)	7,558	6,611	14.56%	12.05%
Native American or Alaska Native (NH)	118	101	0.23%	0.18%
Asian (NH)	676	1,676	1.30%	3.06%
Pacific Islander or Native Hawaiian (NH)	15	32	0.03%	0.06%
Some other race (NH)	99	306	0.19%	0.56%
Two or more races/Multiracial (NH)	765	1,716	1.47%	3.13%
Hispanic or Latino (any race)	8,634	9,825	16.63%	17.92%
Total	51,917	54,842	100.00%	100.00%

=== 2020 census ===
As of the 2020 census, Sarasota had a population of 54,842. The median age was 50.3 years. About 3.9% of residents were under age 5, 14.2% of residents were under the age of 18 and 29.5% of residents were 65 years of age or older. Females comprised 52.5% of the population. For every 100 females there were 91.4 males, and for every 100 females age 18 and over there were 89.2 males age 18 and over.

99.8% of residents lived in urban areas, while 0.2% lived in rural areas.

There were 25,147 households in Sarasota, of which 17.8% had children under the age of 18 living in them. Of all households, 35.0% were married-couple households, 21.8% were households with a male householder and no spouse or partner present, and 35.4% were households with a female householder and no spouse or partner present. About 39.8% of all households were made up of individuals and 20.5% had someone living alone who was 65 years of age or older.

There were 31,366 housing units, of which 19.8% were vacant. The homeowner vacancy rate was 3.2% and the rental vacancy rate was 11.0%.

Racial composition as of the 2020 census
Race	Number	Percent
White	36,282	66.2%
Black or African American	6,795	12.4%
American Indian and Alaska Native	285	0.5%
Asian	1,689	3.1%
Native Hawaiian and Other Pacific Islander	36	0.1%
Some other race	4,047	7.4%
Two or more races	5,708	10.4%
Hispanic or Latino (of any race)	9,825	17.9%

=== 2020 American Community Survey ===
The 2016–2020 American Community Survey estimated 12,474 families in the city. The survey counted 4,056 veterans and reported that 16.7% of residents were foreign born.

The median gross rent was $1,177; 92.5% of households had a computer and 84.2% had a broadband internet subscription.

About 90.0% of residents ages 25 and older had completed high school, and 37.2% held a bachelor's degree or higher.

The median household income was $56,093 and the per capita income was $43,387, with 15.6% of residents living below the poverty threshold.

=== 2010 census ===
As of the 2010 United States census, there were 51,917 people, 22,775 households, and 11,603 families residing in the city.

== Arts and culture ==
=== Attractions ===
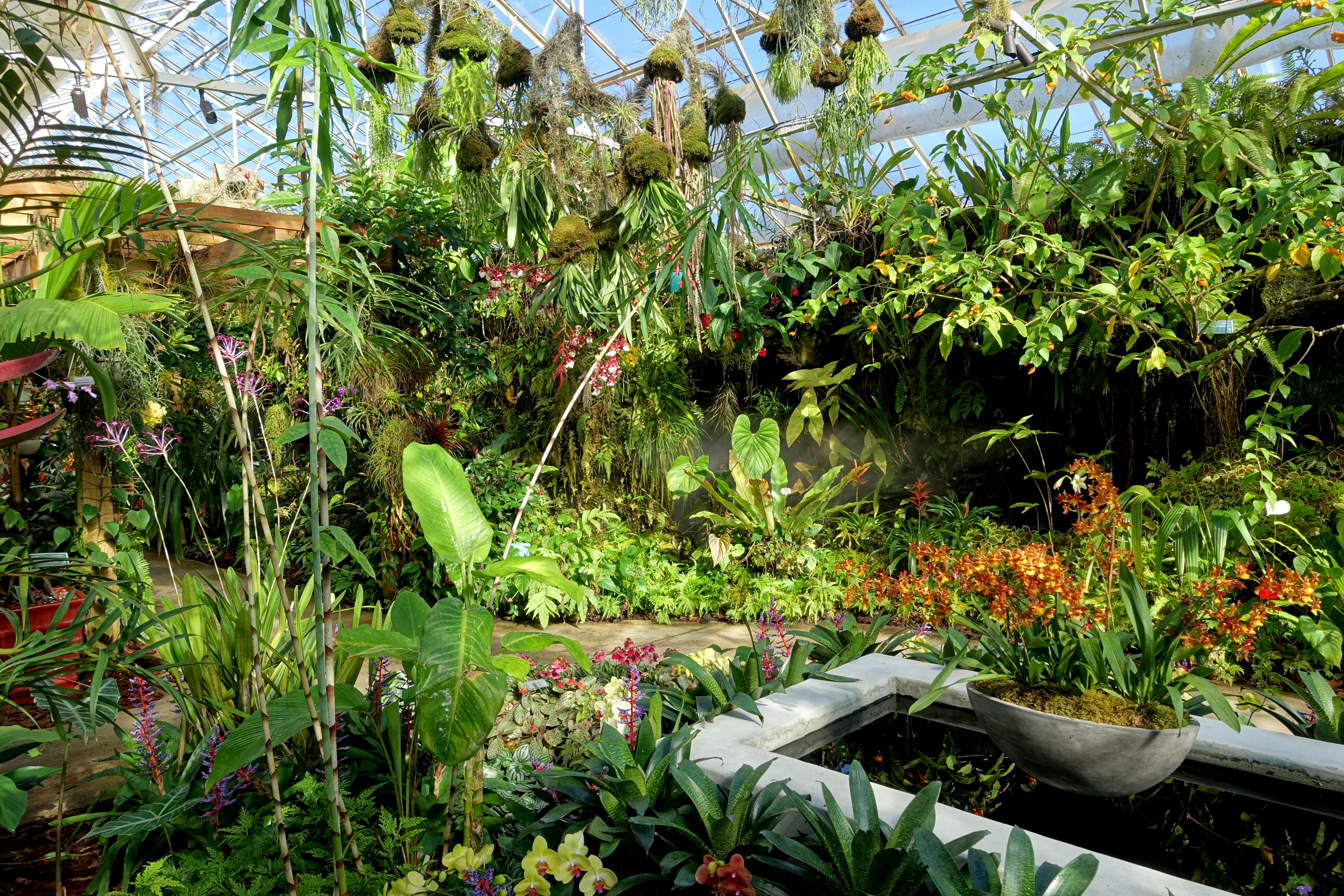
Marie Selby Botanical Gardens

Sarasota is home to Mote Marine Laboratory, a marine rescue, research facility, an aquarium, the Marie Selby Botanical Gardens, the Sarasota Jungle Gardens and the Big Cat Habitat & Gulf Coast Sanctuary.

=== Circus ===
One of Sarasota's nicknames is "Circus City", or alternatively "The Circus Capital of the World", owing in part to John Ringling's decision to move the winter quarters of Ringling Bros. and Barnum & Bailey Circus to Sarasota in 1927. The John and Mable Ringling Museum of Art houses the Circus Museum and the Tibbals Learning Center, established in 1948.

Sarasota is also home to The Circus Arts Conservatory, which is responsible for the tent show Circus Sarasota and the "oldest youth circus", Sailor Circus. In 2017, The Circus Arts Conservatory took part in the Smithsonian Folk Festival.

The Showfolks Club, a social organization that also puts on an annual circus performance billed as "Sarasota's longest running circus event", is located in Sarasota.

The Circus Ring of Fame is a series of commemorative plaques in St. Armand's Circle, honoring prominent figures in circus history, similar to the Hollywood Walk of Fame. Honorees include Paul Binder, Nik Wallenda, and the King Charles Troupe, among over 150 others.

Residents of Sarasota that have been associated with the circus include daredevil and Guinness World Record holder Bello Nock, himself an honoree of the Circus Ring of Fame, as well as aerialist and circus proprietor Dolly Jacobs, who cofounded The Circus Arts Conservatory.

=== Festivals ===
Since 1998, the city has hosted the Sarasota Film Festival annually. The festival attracts independent films from around the world. It claims to be one of Florida's largest film festivals. In 2009 the annual Ringling International Arts Festival, held its premier and held its closing event in the historic Asolo theater, which had been moved and rebuilt again. The historic Venetian theater now is housed in the reception building for the museum where it is used for special events as well as performances, informative purposes, and another seasonal film series hosted by the museum.

Florida Studio Theatre produces the annual Sarasota Improv Festival. Founded in 2009 by Rebecca Hopkins, FST's annual Sarasota Improv Festival brings together improvisers from across the country and worldwide. The Festival has become a destination event, drawing thousands across Florida and beyond. Past performers have come from as far as Mexico, Canada, Spain, France, and the United Kingdom to perform on Florida's Gulf Coast.

In 2010, the Sarasota Chalk Festival that is held yearly in the historic area of Burns Square became the first international street painting festival in the United States. Celebrating the sixteenth-century performance art of Italian street painting, the festival hosted Maestro Madonnaro Edgar Mueller from Germany, who created the first street painting that changed images from day to night. The festival has a different theme each year and has introduced new techniques in street art. Other applications of street art such as murals and "cellograff graffiti" have become companion events also produced by Avenida de Colores, Inc. The murals are part of the "Going Vertical" project, and although it sometimes coincides with the chalk festival, it is distinct from it and often continues throughout the year. Except for a few commissioned on public property in the Palm Avenue Parking Garage, the murals are on private property and are in many sections of Sarasota and Manatee County. As of 2014 the Sarasota Chalk festival has relocated to Venice, south of Sarasota. The name Sarasota Chalk Festival remains the same.

It is also home to the Fabulous Arts Foundation, formerly the Harvey Milk Festival, an independent music festival in support of civil rights, focusing on the LGBTQ community. It has been celebrated in May annually since 2010 on the weekend closest to Harvey Milk's birthday. It is currently the largest independent music festival in Sarasota, with thousands of attendees throughout the free, public, multi-day event that also includes gallery showings, film, and other live performances.

Sarasota is home to the Whiskey Obsession Festival, the largest whiskey festival in Florida. Established in 2013, the festival features several hundred whiskies from around the world. Dozens of professional brand ambassadors and distillers participate in the festival by engaging in panel discussions, leading classes, and tastings.

=== Music ===
Sarasota is the home of the Sarasota Orchestra, which was founded by Ruth Cotton Butler in 1949 and known for years as the Florida West Coast Symphony. It holds a three-week Sarasota Music Festival that is recognized internationally and boasts it attracts renowned teachers and the finest students of chamber music. Sarasota also boasts a symphonic chorus, Key Chorale, and professional vocal ensemble, Choral Artists of Sarasota. The Jazz Club of Sarasota is one of the largest and most active jazz clubs in the United States and has promoted jazz events in Sarasota for 39 years.

Joe Perry of Aerosmith, Brian Johnson of AC/DC, Dickey Betts of the Allman Brothers Band, Donald Dunn of the Blues Brothers and Graeme Edge of the Moody Blues have all settled in Sarasota.

=== Performing and visual arts ===
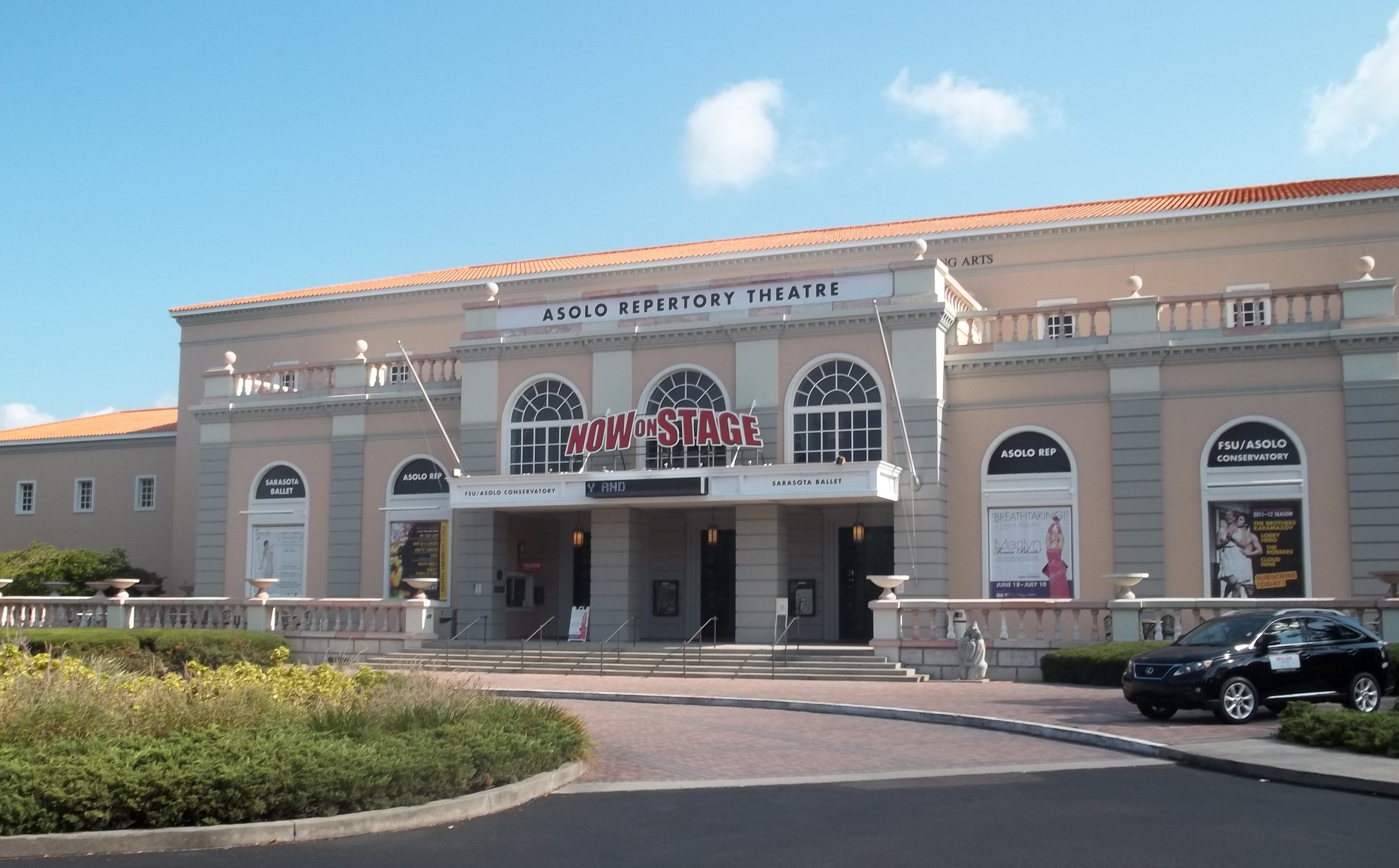
Asolo Repertory Theatre

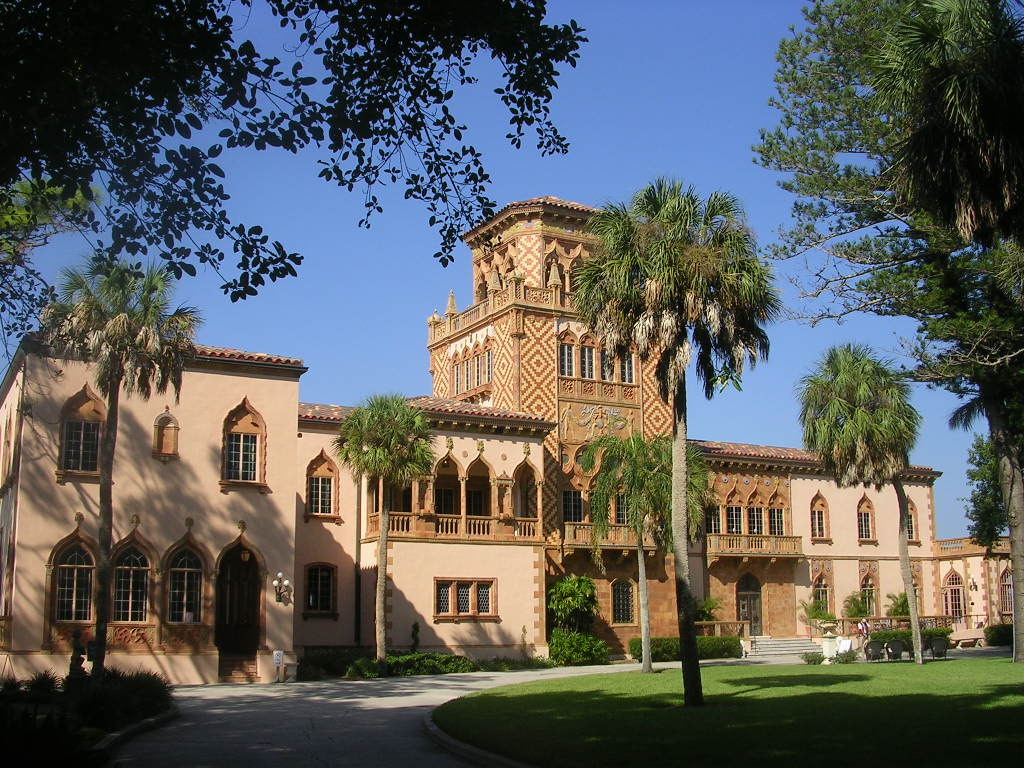
Ca' d'Zan, John and Mable Ringling Museum of Art

Sarasota is home to a performing arts scene, with numerous venues dedicated to music, dance, theatre, circus arts, and more. Among its institutions are the Sarasota Ballet, Sarasota Opera, Asolo Repertory Theatre, Van Wezel Performing Arts Hall, and Florida Studio Theatre. These venues, along with others like the Players Centre for Performing Arts and Sarasota Contemporary Dance.arts community.

Several of Sarasota's theaters have historical significance. The Sarasota Opera House began as the Edward Theatre in 1925, hosting stars like Elvis Presley and Will Rogers before becoming a permanent home for the Sarasota Opera. The Historic Asolo Theater, imported from Asolo, Italy, and reconstructed by the Ringling Museum in the 1950s, originally served Queen Catherine Cornaro of Cyprus. In the 1980s, another Asolo Theater, part of the Florida State University Center for the Performing Arts, was constructed around the historic Dunfermline Opera House from Scotland, housing the FSU/Asolo Conservatory for Actor Training and hosting film festivals and theatrical performances.

Florida Studio Theatre (FST) has preserved and repurposed several historic buildings. Its Keating Theatre, once the Sarasota Woman's Club founded in 1903, served as the town's first library and community hub before being saved from demolition in 1976. The building was added to the National Register of Historic Places in 1985 and later expanded. FST also acquired the Gompertz Theatre, originally a 1920s movie house that underwent various transformations before becoming part of FST in 2003.

Sarasota and the Cultural Coast are home to fine art, film-making, circus history and performance, and decorative arts. The Sarasota Art Museum and the John and Mable Ringling Museum of Art are both in Sarasota.

=== Architecture ===
A large number of homes and buildings are designed in the Italian style. Italian architecture and culture are present in the area including at the John and Mable Ringling Museum of Art. Ringling's home, Cà d'Zan, was mostly modeled on the Venetian. Examples of those more typically seen in the same style are the residences of Edith Ringling and of Hester Ringling Lancaster Sanford, that also are among the structures in the Caples–Ringling Estates Historic District. Italian inspired statues are also common and the copy of Michelangelo's David at the museum is used as the symbol of Sarasota.

The Sarasota School of Architecture developed as a variant of mid-century modernist architecture. It incorporates elements of both the Bauhaus and Frank Lloyd Wright's "organic" architecture. The style developed as an adaptation to the area's sub-tropical climate and used newly emerging materials that were manufactured or implemented following World War II.

=== Historic buildings and sites ===
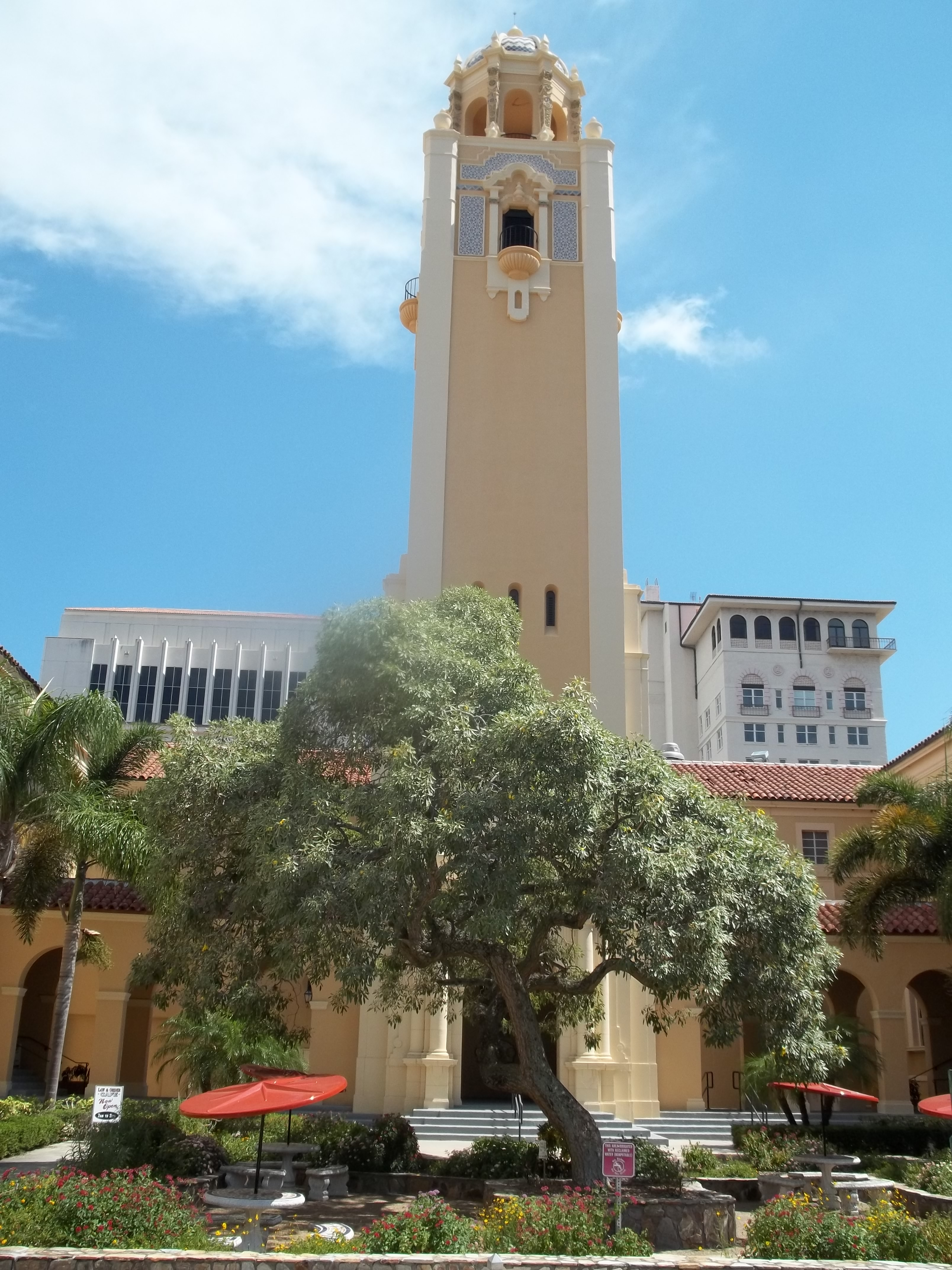
Sarasota County Courthouse

By the end of the twentieth century, many of Sarasota's more modest historical structures were demolished. Recently, two historic buildings, the Crocker Church and the Bidwell-Wood House (the oldest remaining structure in the city), first restored by Veronica Morgan and members of the Sarasota Alliance for Historic Preservation that she founded, became city property. These structures were relocated to this park, despite protests from residents who objected to the loss of park area.

In the late 1970s, Sarasota County purchased the Terrace Hotel that Charles Ringling built and renovated it for use as a county government office building. The adjacent courthouse that he donated to the new county in 1921 has been listed on the National Register of Historic Places. The courthouse complex was designed by Dwight James Baum.

In the next decade, the landmark hotel built by Owen Burns, the El Vernona, which had been turned into apartments, became endangered. By then, it was called the John Ringling Towers and was purchased by a phosphate miner, Gardinier, who wanted to turn it into his corporate headquarters. Plans were made to restore the building. The city commissioners initially supported the plan, but lobbying to undermine the project began, and one of the commissioners changed her vote. The project was denied at the final hearing.

Remarkable preservation success occurred during the 1990s when the community exhibition hall, the Municipal Auditorium, designed by Thomas Reed Martin and Clarence A. Martin, was listed on the National Register of Historic Places and meticulously restored to its depression recovery era, 1937 WPA community project, completion status, and its architectural glory—both inside and out. The city boasts that 100,000 people use it every year and it is a boon to the community for recreation, lawn sports, as well as being heavily attended for auctions, concerts, conventions, flea markets, galas, graduations, lectures, orchid and flower shows, and a full range of trade shows of interest to the community. Later the Federal Building, designed by George Albee Freeman (the designer of Seagate for industrialist Powell Crosley Jr.) and Louis A. Simon, which initially had served as the post office was restored as well.

Most of the luxurious historic residences from the 1920s boom period along the northern shore of Sarasota Bay also have survived. This string of homes, built on large parcels of elevated land along the widest point of the bay, is anchored by the John and Mable Ringling Museum of Art at its center.

Many significant structures from the comparatively recent "Sarasota School of Architecture" period of the mid-twentieth century, however, have not survived. Since they do not qualify under the age criteria set for historic preservation nominations, their historical aspect often escapes public recognition. Others frequently are threatened by demolition plans for new development without consideration of their cultural and historical importance to the community instead of motivating the implementation of plans to retain the buildings and integrate them into new plans.

In 2006, the Sarasota County School Board slated one of Paul Rudolph's largest Sarasota projects, Riverview High School, for demolition. The board decided despite protests by many community members, including architects, historic preservationists, and urban planners. Others supported the demolition as they believed the structure was no longer functional. The issue was divisive. The World Monuments Fund included the school on its 2008 Watch List of 100 Most Endangered Sites in the category Main Street Modern.

Following a March 2007 charrette led by the National Trust for Historic Preservation, a proposal was advanced to renovate and preserve Rudolph's buildings. The school board decided to allow a year to consider implementing the innovative plan proposed to preserve the buildings, which would include building a parking garage with playing fields above it rather than demolishing the structures. In early June 2008, the school board voted in a 3–2 decision to allow the demolition; School board members Shirley Brown, Caroline Zucker and Frank Kovatch voted against preserving the historic high school. This decision was that school would be demolished and that a parking lot would replace it. One year later, in June 2009, Riverview High School was demolished.

In December 2019, a former Sarasota High School facility was transformed into the Sarasota Art Museum of Ringling College. The 93-year-old building was renovated to include 80,000 square feet for the museum's campus with about 15,000 square feet for exhibitions, costing about $30 million according to the president of Ringling College, Larry Thompson.

=== Other notable cultural features ===
The Sarasota neighborhood of Pinecraft is home to a relatively liberal Amish-Mennonite community which is unusual compared to other Amish communities as it consists mainly of elderly who moved to Florida because of its mild climate, of Amish people who are on holiday and of Amish who do not fit in easily in other communities. Breaking Amish: Brave New World, a television series of scripted reality is set in Pinecraft. It is a spin-off of Breaking Amish.

The Rosemary District was an African American community and is home to the Boulevard of the Arts. Newtown is predominantly and historically African American.

== Sports ==
Golf being played at Sarasota in 1905

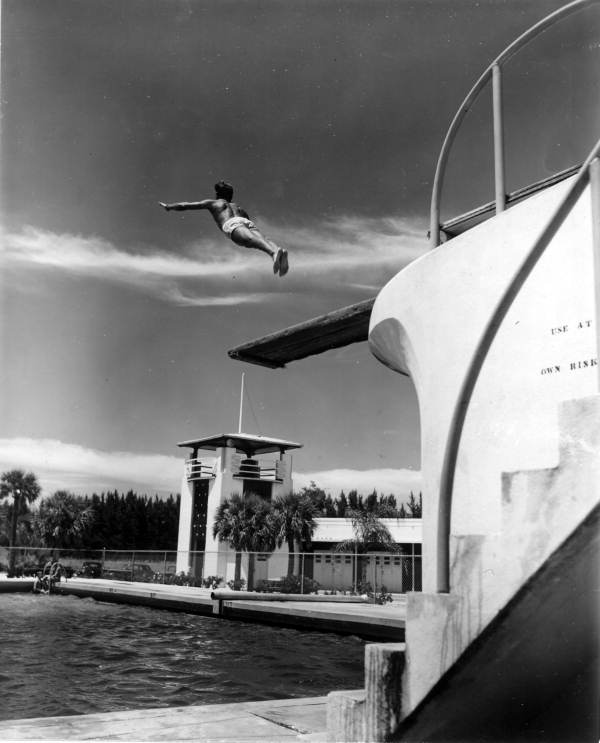
Lido Beach Pool in Sarasota, 1946

Sarasota was home to the Sarasota Paradise, a professional team that played most recently in USL League One during the 2026 season. The club was founded in 2023, as an amateur team in USL League Two. The team played its games at Premier Sports Campus. In 2013, Sarasota became the home of the Sarasota Thunder, which was to play in the Ultimate Indoor Football League, but the team folded. Sarasota and Bradenton together held the 2021 U-18 Baseball World Cup.

The Sarasota Marathon started in 2005. In 2010, declining sponsorship and marathon registration led organizers to change the event to a half marathon. The race begins and ends near the John and Mable Ringling Museum. In 2014, Sarasota hosted the modern pentathlon World Cup Final.

Sarasota is home to two swim teams. The Sarasota Sharks have won national championships. A newer team, the Sarasota Tsunami, was founded by the former Sharks head coach and is also nationally competitive. The teams maintain a rivalry. The Sarasota Sailing Squadron is a highly active facility that has hosted many nationally renowned regattas for both dinghies and larger vessels.

== Parks and recreation ==
In 1937 the Municipal Auditorium-Recreation Club was built with funds provided by the Works Progress Administration, the municipal government, and local residents and business owners. It became a center for sports, entertainment, and recreation. The sports activities have ranged from badminton, basketball, boating, lawn bowling, and shuffleboard, to tennis. The auditorium hosts clubs for cards, dancing, games, gardening, and numerous hobbies as well as having become the community meeting place for commercial and educational shows and the venue for local schools and charities to hold events and dances. Tourists are attracted to exhibitions provided by local businesses as well as vendors from national circuits. This building was listed in the National Register of Historic Places because of its architecture and for providing the enormous range of community activities that are scheduled at it every week.

Sarasota is home to Ed Smith Stadium where the Baltimore Orioles have held spring training since 2010. The Orioles also have minor league facilities at the Buck O'Neil Baseball Complex at Twin Lakes Park. Previously, Ed Smith Stadium was the spring training home of the Cincinnati Reds and the minor league Sarasota Reds.

The warm climate helped the Sarasota area become a popular golf destination. John Hamilton Gillespie was an early pioneer of the game in Sarasota. The Sara Bay course in the Whitfield area was designed by golf architect Donald Ross. Bobby Jones was associated with the community course in Sarasota. Many courses dot the area, including the one originally laid out for the hotel John Ringling planned on the southern tip of Longboat Key.

Sport fishing attracts enthusiasts to Sarasota as a result of the action that the bay offers. Tarpon was the biggest draw, but gigantic gar as well as many other species abounded to attract the notable Owen Burns and Powel Crosley.

Nathan Benderson Park contains a lake with a specialized 2,000 meter eight-lane rowing course. It was the venue for the World Rowing Championships in 2017, held on September 23 – October 1, 2017. The park has been the site of USRowing's Youth National Championship Regatta in June 2015, 2017, 2021, 2022, 2023, and 2026 and has hosted the NCAA women's rowing national championship (Division I, Division II and Division III) in 2018, 2021 and 2022. The park has also hosted trials of the men's and women's U.S. teams for the Summer Olympic Games of 2016 and 2020.

== Government ==
The municipal government of Sarasota was established when it was incorporated as a town on October 14, 1902. Sarasota was reincorporated as a city on May 13, 1913. Thereafter, it was called the "City of Sarasota". Sarasota later was designated as the county seat when Sarasota County was carved out of Manatee County in 1921 during the creation of several new counties.

In 1945 the commission-manager government form was adopted for the city and it is governed by a five-person commission elected by popular vote, two members of which serve in the ceremonial positions of "mayor" and "vice-mayor", as chosen by the commission every April. Two at-large commissioners are elected by all voters, and the city is divided into three districts for which the residents of each elect one district representative to the five-member commission. Debbie Trice was voted Mayor for 202–2026 period.

Sarasota has an official seal, which was adopted in 2022, replacing the original seal that was adopted in 1902. Sarasota's seal also has the city motto on it: "May Sarasota Prosper". The city seal consists of a silhouette of the Statue of David.

Many aspects of the city are overseen by the county government ranging from the schools, the libraries, the bay, major waterways, county-designated roads, the airport, fire departments, property and ad valorem taxes, voting, the health department, extension services, stormwater control, mosquito control, the courts, and the jail.

=== Mayors ===
The municipal government of Sarasota was established when it was incorporated as a town on October 14, 1902. Sarasota was then reincorporated as a city on May 13, 1913.

Since its incorporation, Sarasota has been governed by a commission–manager form of government. There are a total of five city commissioners: two that are elected "at large" and three from single-member districts. The mayor and vice mayor are selected from the five city commissioners.

Mayors of Sarasota, Florida, include:

- J. Hamilton Gillespie (1902–1907), property developer
- J. B. Chapline (1907 and 1908), a real estate agent
- G. W. Franklin (1908 and 1909), a furniture store owner
- J. Hamilton Gillespie (1909 and 1910)
- Hamden S. Smith (1910 and 1911), ice company owner
- Harry H. Higel (1911 to 1914), property developer and Great Floridian
- A. B. Edwards (1914 to 1916), realtor
- Harry H. Higel (1916 and 1917 second stint)
- G. W. Franklin 1917–1919
- A. B. Edwards (Arthur Britton Edwards) 1919–1921
- E. J. Bacon 1921–1931
- E. A. Smith 1931–1937
- Verman Kimbrough 1937–1939
- E. A. Smith 1939–1945
- J. Douglas Arnest 1945–1948
- J. Fite Robertson 1948–1951
- John L. Early 1951 – April 1953
- Leroy T. Fenne April 1953 – December 1953, owner of the Sarasota Hotel
- Ben Hopkins, Jr. 1953–1955
- John D. Kicklighter 1955–1956
- A. Ray Howard 1956–1957
- Frank L. Hoersting 1957–1958
- Col. Fred W. Dennis 1958–1959
- Frank Hoersting 1959–1960
- Marshall E. Marable 1960–1961
- John 0. Binns 1961–1962
- Herschel C. Hayo 1962–1964
- David Cohen 1964–1966
- Jack Betz 1966–1969
- D. William Overton 1969–1970
- Jack Betz (John C.) 1970–1971
- Gerald E. Ludwig 1971–1972
- Fred E. Soto 1972–1973
- J. "Tony" Saprito 1973–1975
- Elmer G. Berkel 1975–1976
- Ronald Norman 1976–1978
- Elmer G. Berkel 1978–1979
- Fred E. Soto 1979–1981
- Ronald W. Norman 1981–1982
- Rita J. Roehr 1982–1983
- Annie M. Bishopric 1983–1984
- Lou Ann Palmer 1984–1985
- William G. Kline 1985–1986
- Kerry G. Kirschner 1986–1987
- Fredd G. Atkins 1987–1988, first African-American mayor
- Rita J. Roehr 1988–1989
- Lou Ann Palmer 1989–1990
- Kerry G. Kirschner 1990–1991
- Fredd G. Atkins 1991–1992
- Jack Gurney 1992–1993
- Gene M. Pillot 1993–1994
- Nora Patterson 1994–1995
- David Merrill 1995–1996
- Mollie C. Cardamone 1996–1997
- Gene M. Pillot 1997–1998
- Jerome Dupree 1998–1999
- Mollie C. Cardamone 1999–2000
- Gene M. Pillot 2000–2001
- Albert F. Hogle 2001–2001
- Carolyn J. Mason 2001–2003, first African-American woman mayor
- Lou Ann Palmer 2003–2004
- Richard F. Martin 2004–2005
- Mary Anne Servian 2005–2006
- Fredd G. Atkins 2006–2007
- Lou Ann Palmer 2007–2009
- Richard Clapp 2009–2010
- Kelly Kirschner 2010–2011
- Suzanne Atwell 2011–2013
- Shannon Snyder 2013–2014
- Willie Charles Shaw 2014–2017
- Shelli Freeland Eddie 2017–2018, a lawyer
- Liz Alpert 2018–2019, an attorney
- Jen Ahearn-Koch 2019–2020, a marketing consultant
- Hagen Brody 2020–2021
- Erik Arroyo 2021–2022
- Kyle Battie 2022, former television show host
- Liz Alpert 2023–2024
- Debbie Trice

== Education ==
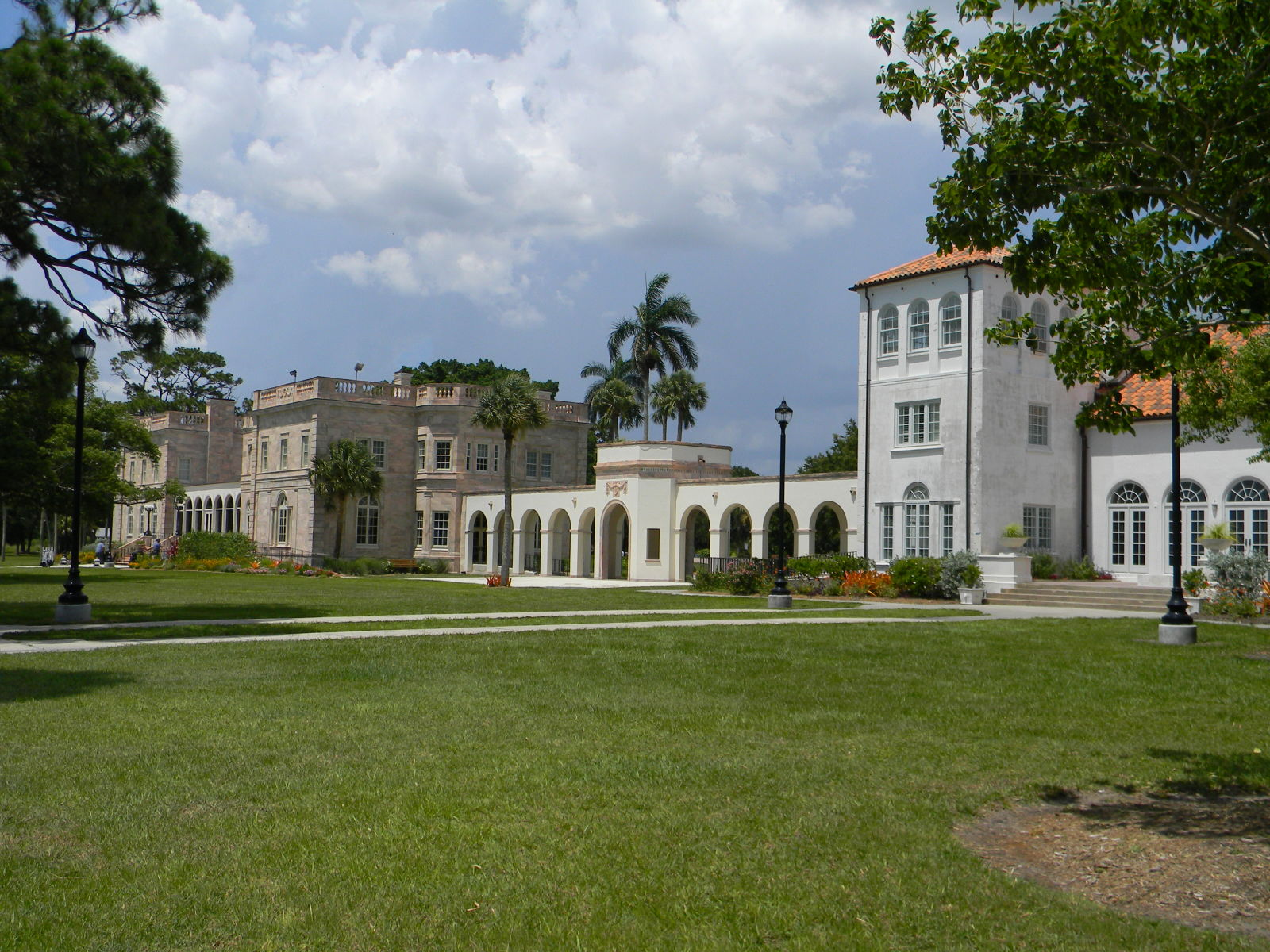
New College of Florida campus

Public primary and secondary education is provided by the Sarasota County Public Schools school district. The district includes 15 elementary schools, five middle schools, and the following secondary schools: Booker High School, Pine View School for the Gifted, Riverview High School, Sarasota High School, Suncoast Polytechnical High School, Sarasota Military Academy, and Oak Park School. Sarasota was also home to the Flint School, a preparatory school for boating. Private education includes Liberty Christian Academy, Ascension Lutheran School, The Classical Academy of Sarasota, Sarasota Christian School, Cardinal Mooney Catholic High School and Out-of-Door Academy.

In higher education, Sarasota is home to New College of Florida, a public liberal arts college and the honors college for the State University System of Florida. Additional colleges in Sarasota include Keiser University of Sarasota (a private, not for profit university); FSU/Asolo Conservatory for Actor Training (Florida State University's MFA Acting Conservatory in conjunction with the Asolo Repertory Theatre); Ringling College of Art and Design, a school of visual arts and design; and satellite campuses of Eckerd College, based in St. Petersburg, Florida; and Florida State University College of Medicine, based in Tallahassee, Florida. Other colleges in the city include East West College of Natural Medicine, an accredited college of acupuncture and Chinese medicine. Nearby educational institutions with regional draw include State College of Florida, Manatee-Sarasota, and a commuter branch of the University of South Florida, with the main campus located in Tampa.

== Media ==
=== Television ===
Sarasota is part of the Nielsen-designated Tampa-Saint Petersburg-Sarasota television market. The local television stations are ABC-affiliate WWSB and the SNN: Suncoast News Network, a continuous local cable news operation run by Comcast, Frontier FiOS and the Sarasota Herald-Tribune. WWSB is the only network station with studios in Sarasota. Other network and public television programming serving the community is offered by Fort Myers and Tampa television stations. Comcast provides cable television service. DirecTV and Dish Network direct broadcast satellite television including Tampa Bay Area local and national channels to Sarasota residents.

Sarasota made national headlines in July 1974 when WWSB (then called WXLT) news anchor Christine Chubbuck shot herself live on-air.

=== Radio ===
Arbitron has identified the Sarasota-Bradenton radio market as the seventy-third largest market in the country, and the sixth largest in the state of Florida. There are eight radio stations in the city: WSMR (89.1FM, classical music), WSLR-LP (96.5FM, variety-talk and community issues), WKZM (104.3FM, religious; repeating WKES Lakeland), WSRZ (107.9FM, oldies), WLSS (930AM, talk), WSRQ (1220AM, 98.9FM, 106.9FM, talk), WTMY (1280AM, talk), WTZB (105.9FM, rock music; commonly known as The Buzz) and WSDV (1450AM, adult standards). WHPT (102.5 FM, Hot Talk) and WRUB (106.5FM, Spanish) are licensed to Sarasota and have broadcasting facilities in the Sarasota / Bradenton area, but have studios in the Tampa Bay area and are focused on that region.

The community also is served by most radio stations from the Tampa Bay radio market, as well as some stations from the nearby Fort Myers radio market.

=== Newspaper ===
The Sarasota Herald-Tribune is the daily newspaper published in the city and the weekly newspaper is the Sarasota Observer. From neighboring Manatee County, the Bradenton Herald also is distributed daily in the area and The Bradenton Times is an electronic weekly newspaper that covers Sarasota topics as well. Sarasota Magazine also served the community.

=== Filming location ===
In 1952, Cecil B. DeMille filmed and premiered The Greatest Show on Earth (with James Stewart, Charlton Heston, Betty Hutton) in Sarasota. In 1998, two studio films were filmed in Sarasota: Alfonso Cuaron's Great Expectations, with Ethan Hawke, Gwyneth Paltrow, Hank Azaria, Anne Bancroft and Robert De Niro; and Volker Schlondorff's Palmetto, starring Woody Harrelson, Elisabeth Shue, and Gina Gershon.

Out of Time (2003), a crime drama starring Denzel Washington and Eva Mendes used the Blackburn Point Bridge, Boca Grande and Cortez. In 2013, Taylor Hackford's action movie Parker, with Jason Statham, Jennifer Lopez, Nick Nolte had scenes filmed at Ca' d'Zan in Sarasota.

In June 2017, director Kevin Smith shot his 2022 film, KillRoy Was Here, in Sarasota.

== Infrastructure ==
=== Transportation ===
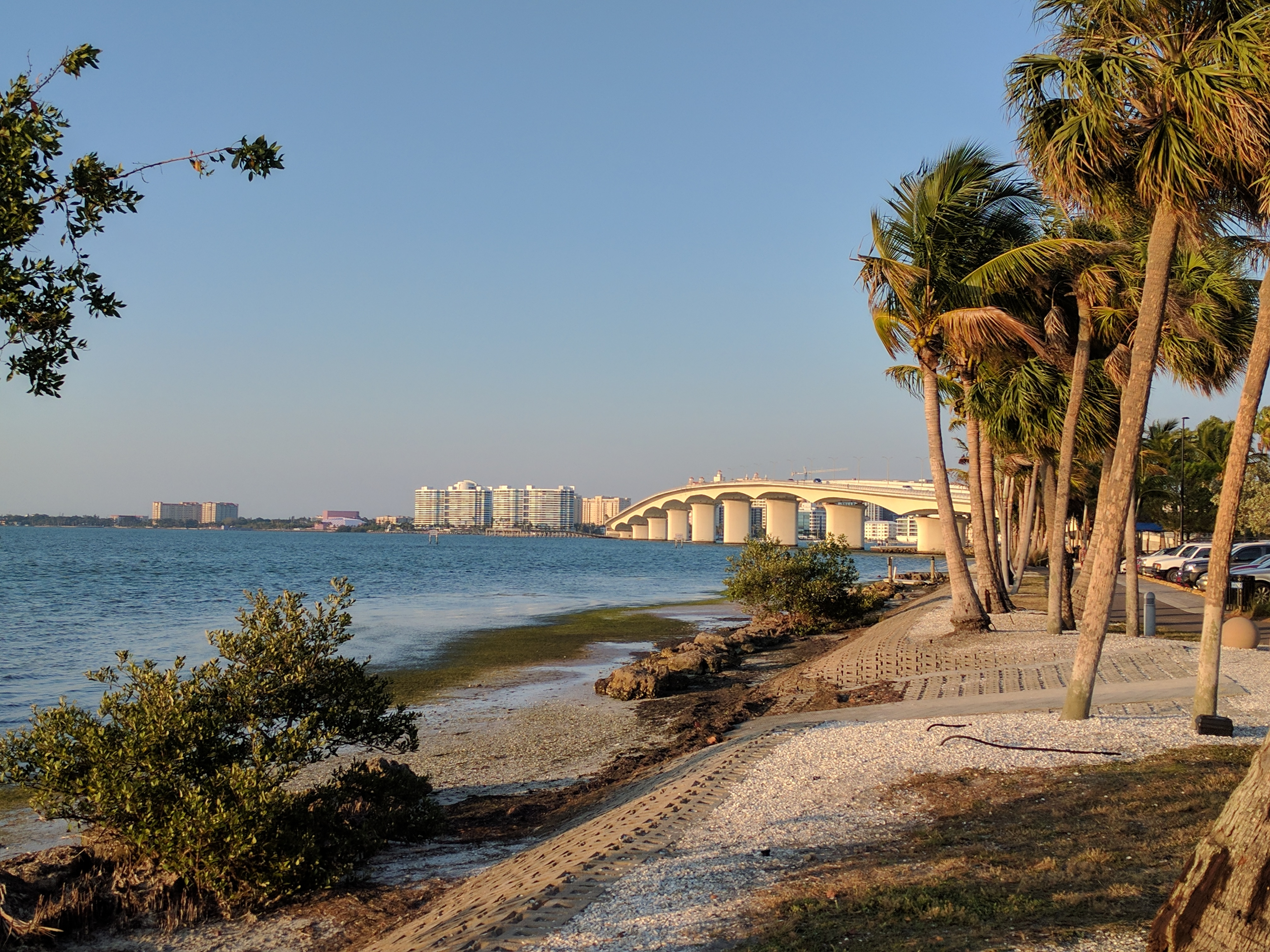
Ringling Causeway, Florida State Road 789

==== Airports ====
The major airport in the area is Sarasota–Bradenton International Airport (SRQ) which is shared by Sarasota and Manatee counties. Since being opened in 1941, it has been the area's major airport. Before this, Lowe's Field functioned as the main airport for the Sarasota Area from 1929 to 1941.

Five airlines offer service out of the airport to locations primarily in the United States and Canada. The airport serves more than 1,300,000 passengers per year. The airport holds full port of entry status providing U.S. Customs inspections for international travelers. St. Petersburg–Clearwater International Airport and Tampa International Airport are located about an hour north of Sarasota, and Southwest Florida International Airport in Ft. Myers an hour and 45 min south of Sarasota. All three offer a wider range of national and international flights.

==== Public transit ====
Sarasota County Area Transit has a bus service called Breeze which offers service throughout the county and also offers limited connections with Manatee County Area Transit. Sarasota County has joined the Tampa Bay Area Regional Transportation Authority to plan and build future transportation infrastructure including light rail, commuter rail and longer range bus service.

==== Rail ====
A key issue is providing Sarasota with access to the Florida High Speed Rail. The Seaboard Coast Line ran intercity train service to the city until 1971. There is no Amtrak train which stops in Sarasota, but Amtrak provides Amtrak Thruway at Sarasota Station, located approximately 2 miles (3.2 km) from the city limits of Sarasota, to the nearest Amtrak terminal in Tampa. A freight-only rail line operated by Seminole Gulf Railway does serve industries in Sarasota. The Seaboard Coast Line ran the last passenger train, the West Coast Champion, to the company's depot on 1971.

==== Water ====
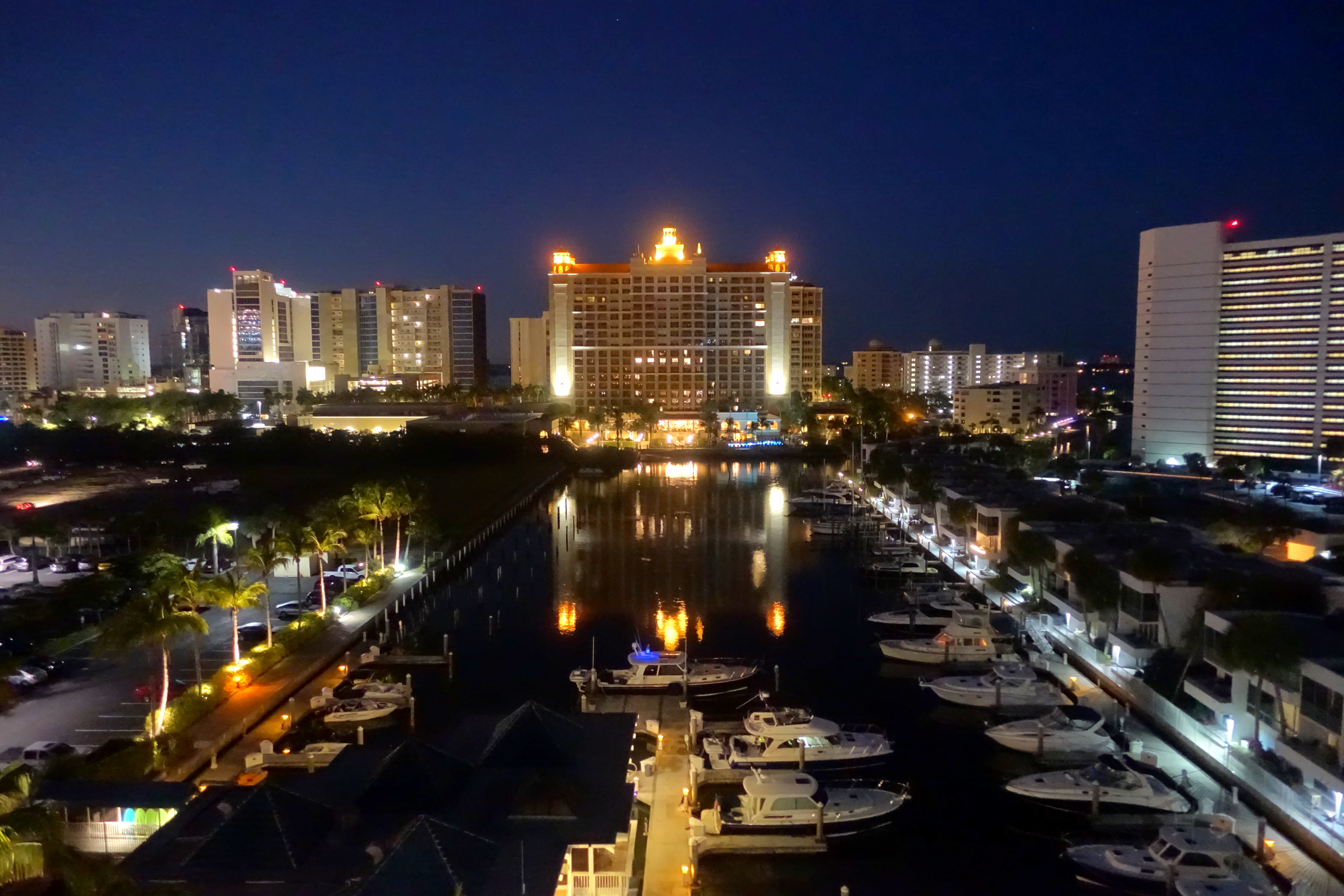
Sarasota marina

As a city located on the Gulf of Mexico, water transportation is a key consideration. The Intracoastal Waterway is a 3,000-mile (4,800 km) waterway providing water access to and from the Atlantic coast for tugs, barges, and leisure boats. Port Manatee and the Port of Tampa both provide nearby deep water ports. Port Manatee provides cargo service primarily while the Port of Tampa is more diverse. Port Manatee formerly even had a cruise line, Regal Cruise Line from 1993 to 2003. It was seized by U.S. Marshals on April 18, 2003, for not being maintained. The waterway enters Sarasota Bay which provides access to downtown Sarasota at the city pier.

==== Roads ====
Because of its location on the Gulf of Mexico and its proximity to several other large metropolitan areas, road transportation is critical to the Sarasota area. The major roads in the area include:

- I-75 – the only freeway in the area, I-75 is located five miles (8 km) east from the center of Sarasota and is a major interstate leading south to Miami and north to Tampa
- U.S. 41 Tamiami Trail – a major north–south route through Sarasota enters the city from the south before heading west at the south end of U.S. 301; after briefly following Bayfront Drive, the Trail heads north again paralleling the coast
- U.S. 301 – heading north from its intersection with U.S. 41, U.S. 301 follows Washington Boulevard running parallel to U.S. 41 until the two roads merge again in Manatee County
- SR 780 – Fruitville Road (Third Street) – a main east–west thoroughfare linking U.S. 41, U.S. 301, and Interstate 75
- SR 789 – starts out as John Ringling Causeway before heading to Bird Key and Lido Key, SR 789 turns north and becomes Gulf of Mexico Drive, a major road on the islands between Sarasota and Bradenton

== Sister cities ==
The U.S. sister city program began in 1956 when President Dwight D. Eisenhower proposed a people-to-people, citizen diplomacy initiative. The Sarasota chapter was established in 1963. A sister city, county, or state relationship is a broad-based, long-term partnership between two communities in two countries. A relationship is officially recognized after the highest elected or appointed official from both communities sign off on an agreement to become sister cities.

Sarasota's sister cities are:

- Perpignan, Pyrénées-Orientales, France (1994)
- Vladimir, Vladimir Oblast, Russia (1994) (suspended)
- Tel Mond, Central District, Israel (1999)
- Dunfermline, Fife, Scotland (2001)
- Siming District, Xiamen, Fujian, China (2007)
- (Mexico) Mérida, Yucatán, México (2010)

=== Friendship cities ===
- Rapperswil-Jona, Kanton St. Gallen, Switzerland (2017)
- Busseto, Emilia-Romagna, Italy (2020)

== See also ==
- List of people from Sarasota
- Newtown
