= Ringling =

Ringling may refer to:

== People ==
- Ringling brothers, seven American siblings of one America's largest circuses
  - Charles Edward Ringling (1863–1926), circus owner
  - John Ringling (1866–1936), circus owner
  - Otto Ringling (1858–1911), American circusman and businessman
- Henry Ringling North (1909–1993), American businessman, as a circus proprietor
- John Ringling North (1903–1985), a president and director of the Ringling Bros. and Barnum & Bailey Circus
- Mable Burton Ringling (1875–1929), art collector

== Places ==
- Ringling, Montana, United States
- Ringling, Oklahoma, United States
- Ringling Bridge, Florida, United States

== Institutions ==
- Ringling Brothers Circus (1884–1919), a circus founded in Wisconsin, United States in 1884
- Ringling Bros. and Barnum & Bailey Circus (1919–2017), an American traveling circus company
- Ringling College of Art and Design, a private college focused on art and design
- Ringling Museum of Art
- Ringling International Arts Festival, an annual festival at the Ringling Museum of Art
