= Robert Edward Ringling =

American opera singer, banker, and circus executive (1897–1950)

Robert E. Ringling
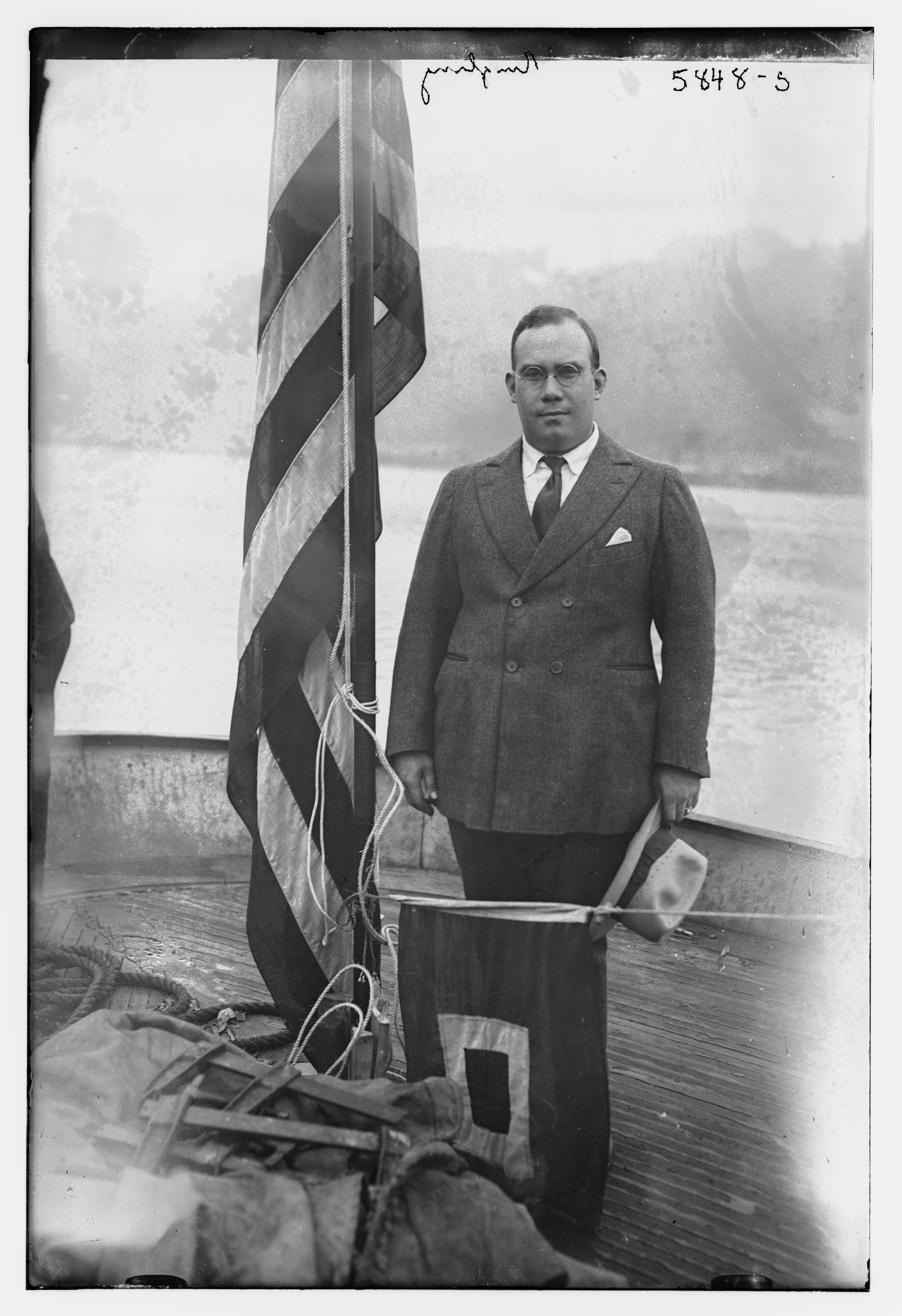
- Born: Robert Edward Ringling; August 16, 1897; Baraboo, Wisconsin, U.S.
- Died: January 3, 1950 (aged 52); Sarasota, Florida, U.S.
- Occupations: Opera singer; banker; circus executive
- Known for: Ringling Bros. and Barnum & Bailey Circus
- Parents: Charles Edward Ringling (father); Edith F. Conway (mother)
- Relatives: Otto Ringling (uncle); Alfred Theodore Ringling (uncle); John Ringling (uncle); Henry Ringling (uncle); John Ringling North (cousin); Henry Ringling North (cousin)

Robert Edward Ringling (August 16, 1897 – January 3, 1950) was an American opera singer, banker, and circus executive. He was the president of the Ringling Bros. and Barnum & Bailey Circus from 1943 to 1946 and later chairman of the board.

== Early life ==
Robert Edward Ringling was born on August 16, 1897, in Baraboo, Sauk County, Wisconsin, United States. He was the only son of Charles Edward Ringling and Edith F. Conway.

His early musical ability was inherited from his mother, an accomplished pianist, and his father, a respected amateur violinist and connoisseur with a prized collection of old violins. Robert took up the violin at seven and the piano at ten, but a football accident soon left him disabled for four years. Between twelve and sixteen, he was bedridden, but with his famous family's resources, Dr. John Ridlon treated him by breaking both hips. After long recovery, he walked again. Even during illness, he studied opera parts and began serious voice lessons at sixteen.

== Career ==
Beginning around 1916 at nineteen, he trained with Fernando Tanara for five years, then after a concert season, opera coach and voice teacher William S. Brady refined his voice over three more years.

He sang baritone for the Chicago Grand Opera. Robert Ringling appeared in the Grand Opera for the 1921 season in Florida.

By the summer of 1922, at age 24, he had a repertoire containing more than twenty baritone roles. He launched an exclusive concert tour in fall 1922 under the supervision of R. E. Johnston of New York, manager of Titta Ruffo, Luisa Tetrazzini, Rosa Raisa, and Beniamino Gigli. The concert tour was financed by his father. Robert E. Ringling appeared with the San Carlo Opera Company in Rigoletto and gave solo recitals across many cities before heading to Europe near the mid-1920s.

He made his foreign debut in January 1924 in Rossini's The Barber of Seville at the Theater Ulm. His successful debut in Ulm, Germany led to a Munich engagement. By summer 1925, he returned from a successful run in Munich, holding a contract for the 1925 winter season and 1926 at the Munich Opera. He committed to sing nineteen roles in the upcoming season, ten of them newly learned in German, with the contract ending August 31, 1926. His full-season agreement featured appearances in Stuttgart, Augsberg, and additional cities, with the Munich Opera appointing him leading baritone at its second-largest salary.

After the passing of his father, Charles, in December 1926, Robert Ringling was elected president of the Ringling Trust & Savings Bank in Sarasota, Florida, where the Ringling circuses had their winter quarters. The bank later liquidated in 1934, paying off all depositors in full.

As an operatic baritone, he made his Chicago debut in 1929 as 'Tonio' in Pagliacci. His rich baritone made him a favorite in Chicago, where he performed with Samuel Insull's Civic Opera Company for five seasons.

== Circus life ==
The opera star gave up the stage in 1934 to help manage the family enterprise. His mother, an owner of the circuses managed by Ringling, transferred him a financial interest in the firm. As a newcomer to the circus, Robert Ringling started out in the publicity department.

Following the death of his uncle John Ringling in December 1936, his cousin John Ringling North became president in 1937. By 1941, he held the post of senior vice president and sat on the board. In 1942, North's five-year term as president came to an end. Robert E. Ringling was named the president of Ringling Bros. and Barnum & Bailey Circus from 1943 to 1946. His presidency included the tragic 1944 Hartford Circus Fire. Ousted as circus president in April 1946, he was succeeded by James A. Haley and remained embroiled in the Ringling family's power struggle. Robert's mother, Edith Ringling, who was the widow of an original Ringling, and Mrs. Aubrey Haley, wife of the new president, each owned 31 percent of the circus. In 1946, his mother Edith willed her 315 shares to him. Robert Ringling was named chairman of the board in November 1947, with John Ringling North as president and Henry Ringling North as vice president. The sale of James A. Haley and his wife's stock to John North and Robert Ringling made it the first time a single individual owned 51 percent of the show's stock. North held 51 percent of the stock, while Robert and his mother held 49 percent. He remained the board chairman until his death in 1950.

== Personal life ==
Robert E. Ringling married his wife, Irene, and had two sons, James C. Ringling and Charles J. Ringling. He lived quietly in the Indian Beach neighborhood near the winter headquarters of the circus.

Ringling, who had a passion for motorboating, once raced Garfield Wood, and won several trophies for his speedboat skills.

== Death ==
Robert Edward Ringling died of a stroke on January 2, 1950, in Sarasota, Florida, at the age of 52. In declining health for months, he nearly died in a Chicago hospital in the summer of 1949.
