= Ringling International Arts Festival =

- Dates: Third week in October
- Location(s): Sarasota, Florida, US
- Coordinates: 27.383067°N 82.559165°W
- Years active: 2009 - present
- Website: Official website

The Ringling International Arts Festival is an annual festival at the Ringling Museum of Art. The first three years the festival was a collaboration with the Baryshnikov Arts Center, but currently is curated solely by the John and Mable Ringling Museum of Art.

Encompassing Sarasota and Manatee Counties, Florida, the annual festival is scheduled every October and includes artists from all over the world.

== Background ==
Sarasota, Florida has been a leading centers of the arts in the Southeastern United States since the 1920s. John Ringling, lead founder of the Ringling Brothers Circus, built his winter home on Sarasota Bay and then completed construction on the Ringling Museum of Art in 1931. Upon his death in 1936, John Ringling left the Museum of Art to the State of Florida. With the museum garnering international recognition, the Sarasota area also became home to major opera, ballet, dance, and theater venues.
