= Ca' d'Zan =

Historic mansion in Sarasota, Florida

- Cà d'Zan
- U.S. Historic district – Contributing property
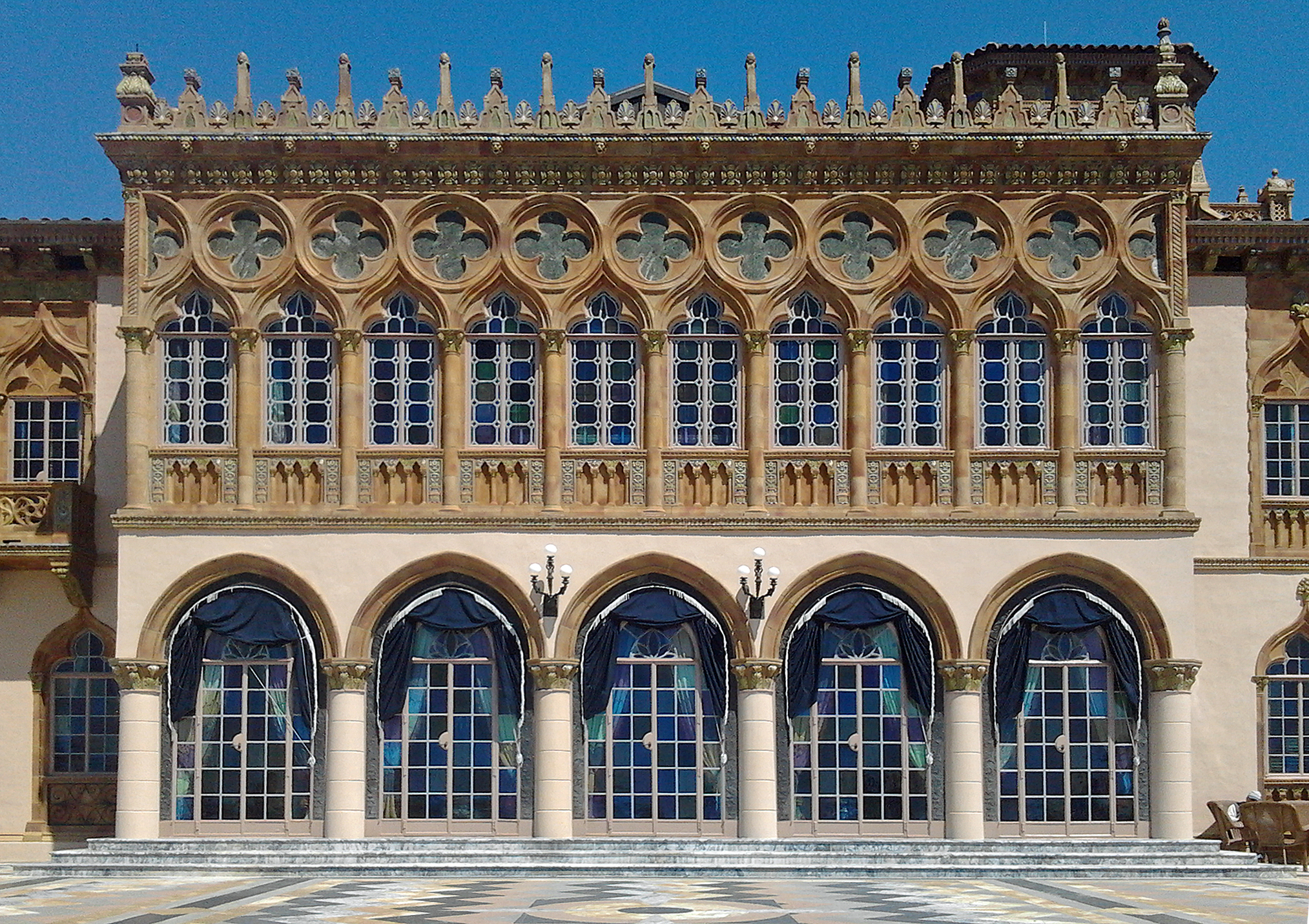
- Cà d'Zan – the bay front façade of the living room on the western elevation showing part of the marble terrace

- Location within Florida Location within the United States
- Location: Sarasota, Florida
- Coordinates: 27°22′59″N 82°33′53″W
- Area: 36,000 square feet (3,300 m^{2})
- Architect: Dwight James Baum
- Architectural style: Mediterranean revival
- Part of: Caples'-Ringlings' Estates Historic District (ID82001039)
- Designated CP: December 15, 1982

Cà d'Zan (/kɑːˌdə.zɑːn/) is a Mediterranean revival residence in Sarasota, Florida, adjacent to Sarasota Bay. Cà d'Zan was built in the mid-1920s as the winter retreat of the American circus mogul, entrepreneur, and art collector John Ringling and his wife Mable Burton Ringling. The name Cà d'Zan means "House of John" in the Venetian language; in Italian it would be "Casa di Giovanni".

Completed in 1926 by Owen Burns, Cà d'Zan features an eclectic array of architectural styles including Venetian Gothic, Italian Renaissance, Moorish, and Spanish-inspired elements drawn from different historic periods. Mable and John Ringling had visited Venice, which inspired the Venetian Gothic influence in the house, prominently seen in a variety of architectural elements such as windows with Gothic arches and terra cotta ornament replicating Gothic tracery.

== Description and history ==
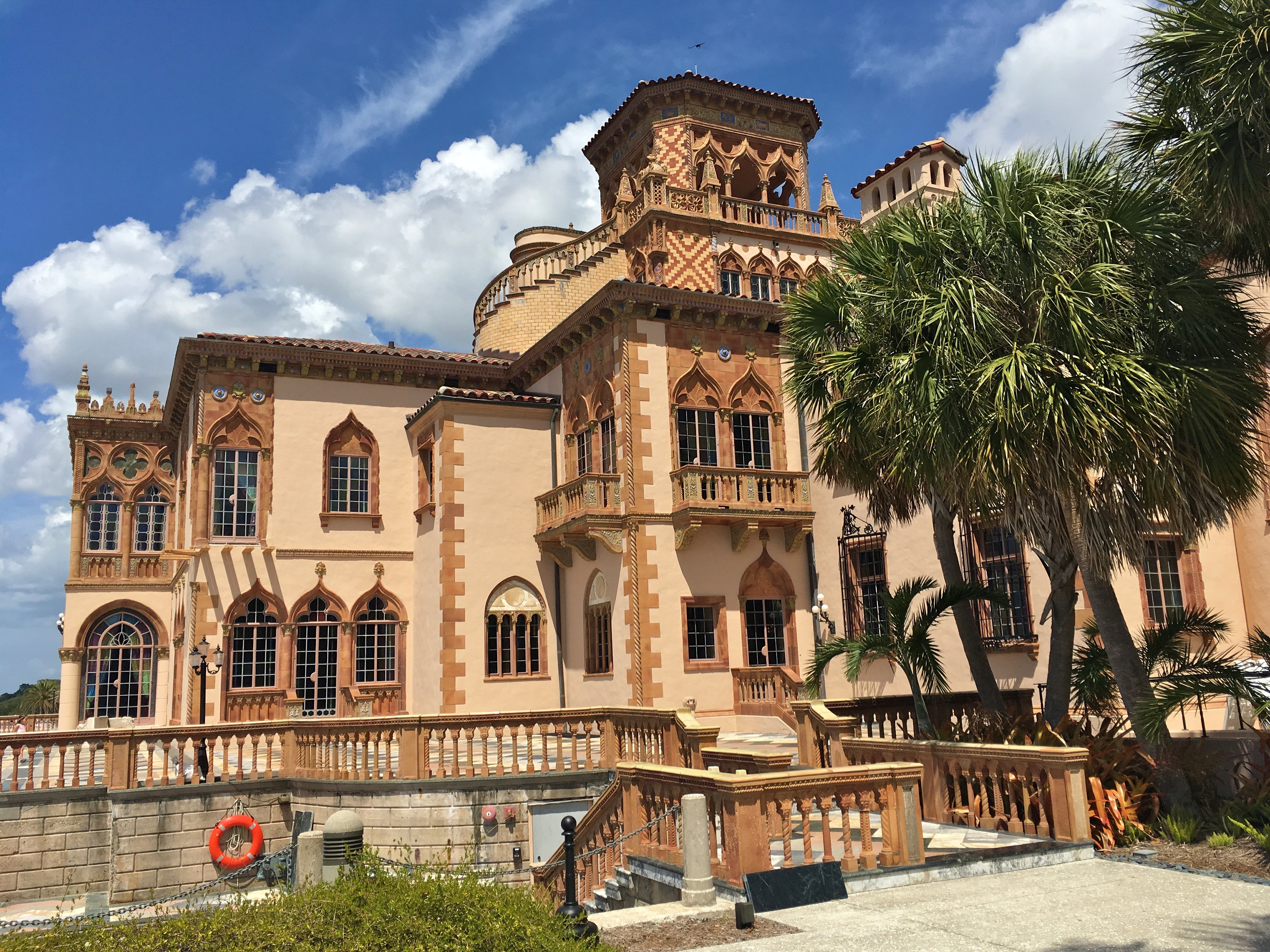
Another façade of Cà d'Zan

Mable and John Ringling first came to Sarasota in 1909 and purchased their waterfront estate in 1911 from Mary Louise and Charles N. Thompson, who owned Shell Beach in what is today Sarasota. The Ringlings wintered at "Palms Elysian", the existing residence on the property built in 1895 for the Thompsons, for more than a decade before they commissioned the architect, Dwight James Baum, to design a new winter residence. Construction of the new residence by Owen Burns began in 1924 and was completed in 1926. Soon after its completion, Cà d'Zan garnered national attention and was called "A Venetian Palace in Florida" when featured in Country Life magazine in 1927. As an expression of revivalist architecture, the array of decorative details that ornament Cà d'Zan's façade was drawn from different cultural and historical eras in European architecture.

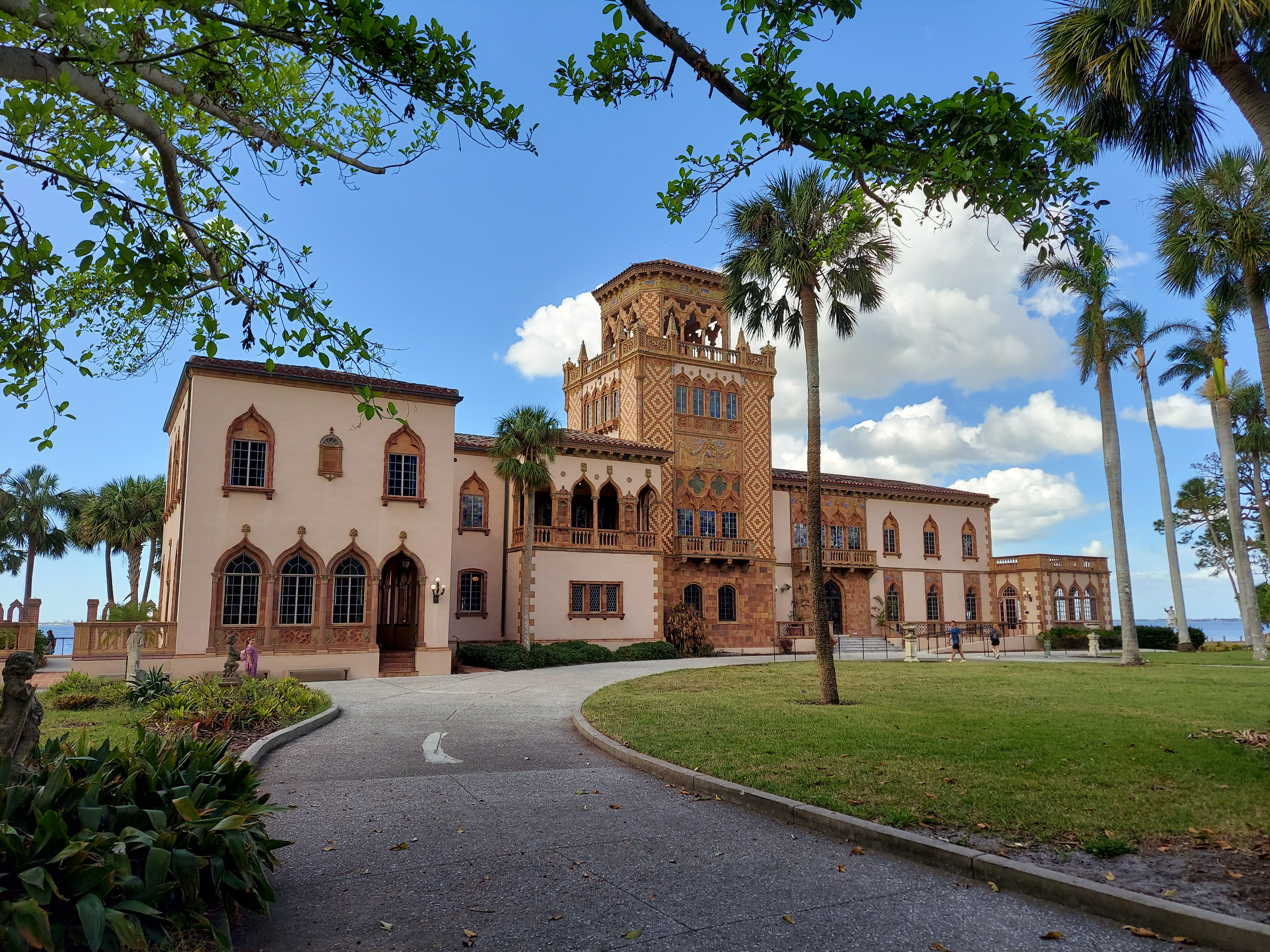
Front facade of Ca' d'Zan

With a total of fifty-six rooms, the Cà d'Zan was meant to impress as a showplace for entertaining. Its first floor consists mainly of principal rooms for entertaining, including a reception room, lounging room, breakfast room, dining room, great hall, and ballroom.

The Ringlings hired Willy Pogany (American, born Hungary, 1882–1955), an artist and designer, to create murals for the elaborate interiors of the house. Pogany's most notable contribution was the series of 26 canvas paintings that adorn the gilded coffered ceiling of the ballroom that depict "Dancers of the different Nations". This unique ceiling mural reflects the broader trend in high-style American interior design for cosmopolitanism, where it was fashionable for wealthy patrons to commission themed decoration to showcase their cosmopolitan outlook.

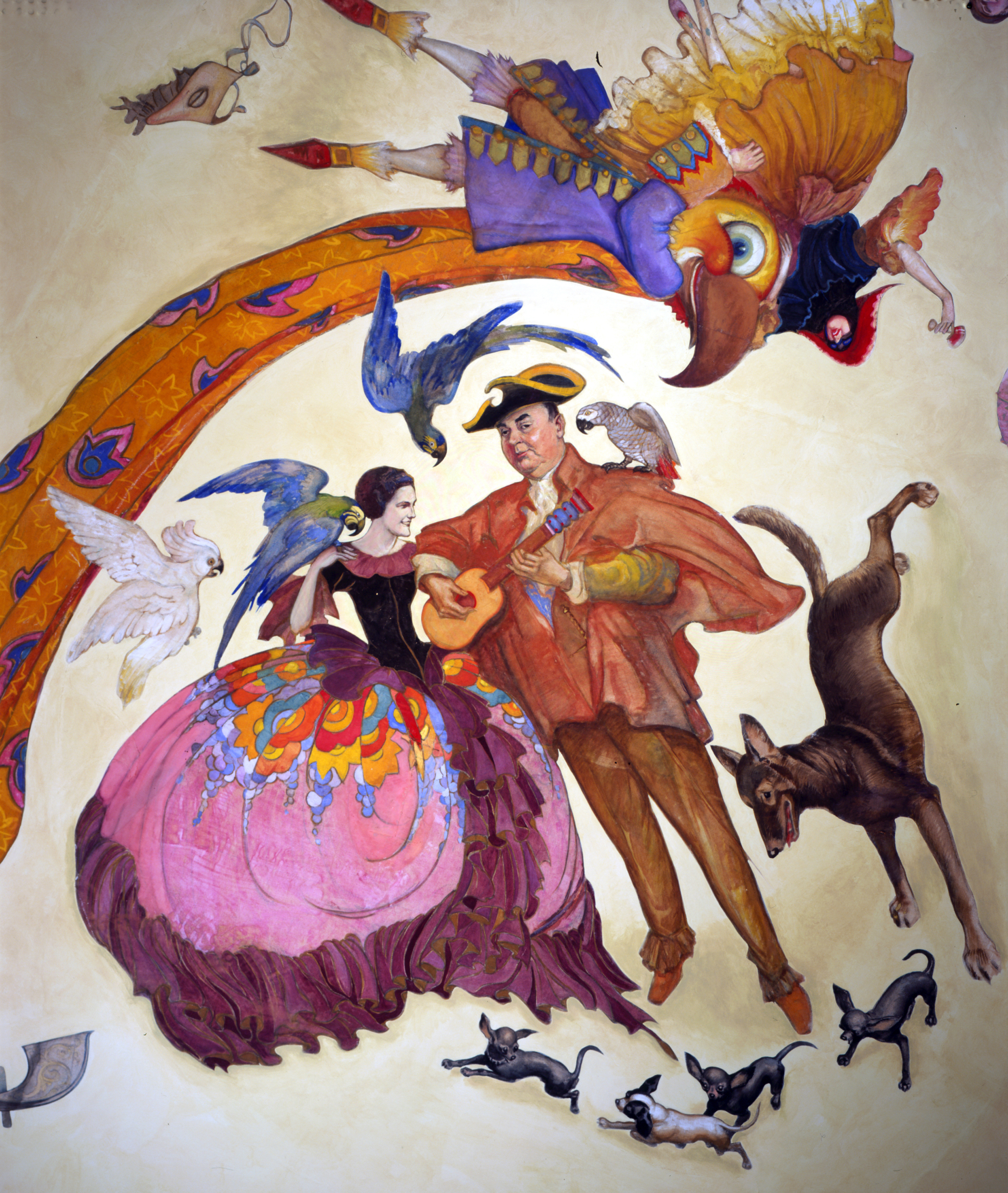
Portrait of Mable and John Ringling, detail of ceiling mural in Cà d'Zan third floor playroom

The ceiling mural portrays dancers from various cultures, including ancient cultures, a range of modern European folk dances, and non-Western cultures. The grandeur of the ballroom ceiling mural reveals the aspirations of the Ringling to impress guests with their knowledge of cultures from around the world. Some of the depictions of cultures are presently seen as imagined cultural stereotypes, though were seen as accurate at the time.

Additionally, Pogany painted a ceiling mural for the third-floor playroom that depicts scenes from festivities surrounding Venetian Carnivale. This mural includes a fanciful portrait of Mable and John Ringling in festive attire and surrounded by a menagerie of pets, including their dogs and exotic birds. Another artist, Robert Webb Jr., was hired to paint decorative details throughout the home, including painting Italianate ornament on the ceiling in the dining room, floral and foliate ornament on the ceiling of the reception room, as well as colorful Venetian-inspired ornament on the pecky cypress ceiling in the great hall.

The Ringlings purchased many antiques and furnishings being disposed of at auctions of Gilded Age estates during a change in fashions among the very wealthy. As such, purchases of much of the ornate, revival style decor of Cà d'Zan may be viewed as acquiring the trappings of wealth that had been fashionable during the cultural era that preceded their time. This reflected the consistent practice by John Ringling of purchasing such trappings at bargain prices while they were not fashionable. Mable planned and developed an extensive rose garden near the house. On the grounds, rare trees were installed or identified, and copies of sculptures from several eras were installed on the property.

After Mable Ringling died in 1929, John Ringling continued to visit Cà d'Zan through financial collapse, a quickly dissolved second marriage, and his declining health until his death in 1936. Cà d'Zan was part of John Ringling's bequest to the state of Florida, along with The John and Mable Ringling Museum of Art, which were meant to be a memorial to and the philanthropic legacy of the lives of Mable and John. The estate was in limbo for ten years, however, as it took much time to settle debts, claims by heirs, and taxes before the state of Florida could take control of the property. Cà d'Zan was uninhabited from 1936 to 1946, and the home deteriorated during that time with a lack of interior climate control. Cà d'Zan opened to the public in 1946 as part of the State Art Museum of Florida.

In 1982, the residence was listed as a contributing property to the Caples'-Ringlings' Estates Historic District, which is on the National Register of Historic Places. Other contributing properties in the district include the Ellen and Ralph Caples residence, The John and Mable Ringling Museum of Art, the Hester Ringling Lancaster Sandford residence, and the Edith and Charles Ringling residence. On April 18, 2012, the AIA's Florida Chapter placed Cà d'Zan, the Residence of John and Mable Ringling on its list, Florida Architecture: 100 Years. 100 Places.

The 1998 film Great Expectations, directed by Alfonso Cuarón, had portions filmed at Cà d'Zan, which served as Ms. Dinsmoor's house, Paradiso Perduto.

The polychrome architectural terra cotta that gives Cà d'Zan its distinctive façade was originally produced by O. W. Ketcham Terra Cotta Works, based in Crum Lynne, Pennsylvania. Over the years, elements of terra cotta have been reproduced, including sections made by O. W. Ketcham Terra Cotta in the 1950s. The residence is a rare survival and glamorous icon of the Florida Boom Years of the 1920s, for which John Ringling played a major role as a real estate developer in Sarasota. Cà d'Zan underwent a major restoration from 1996 to 2002 that cost $15 million. The swimming pool was restored in 2018 and is now a shallow reflecting pool. Historic preservation is ongoing to maintain the nearly 100-year-old home.

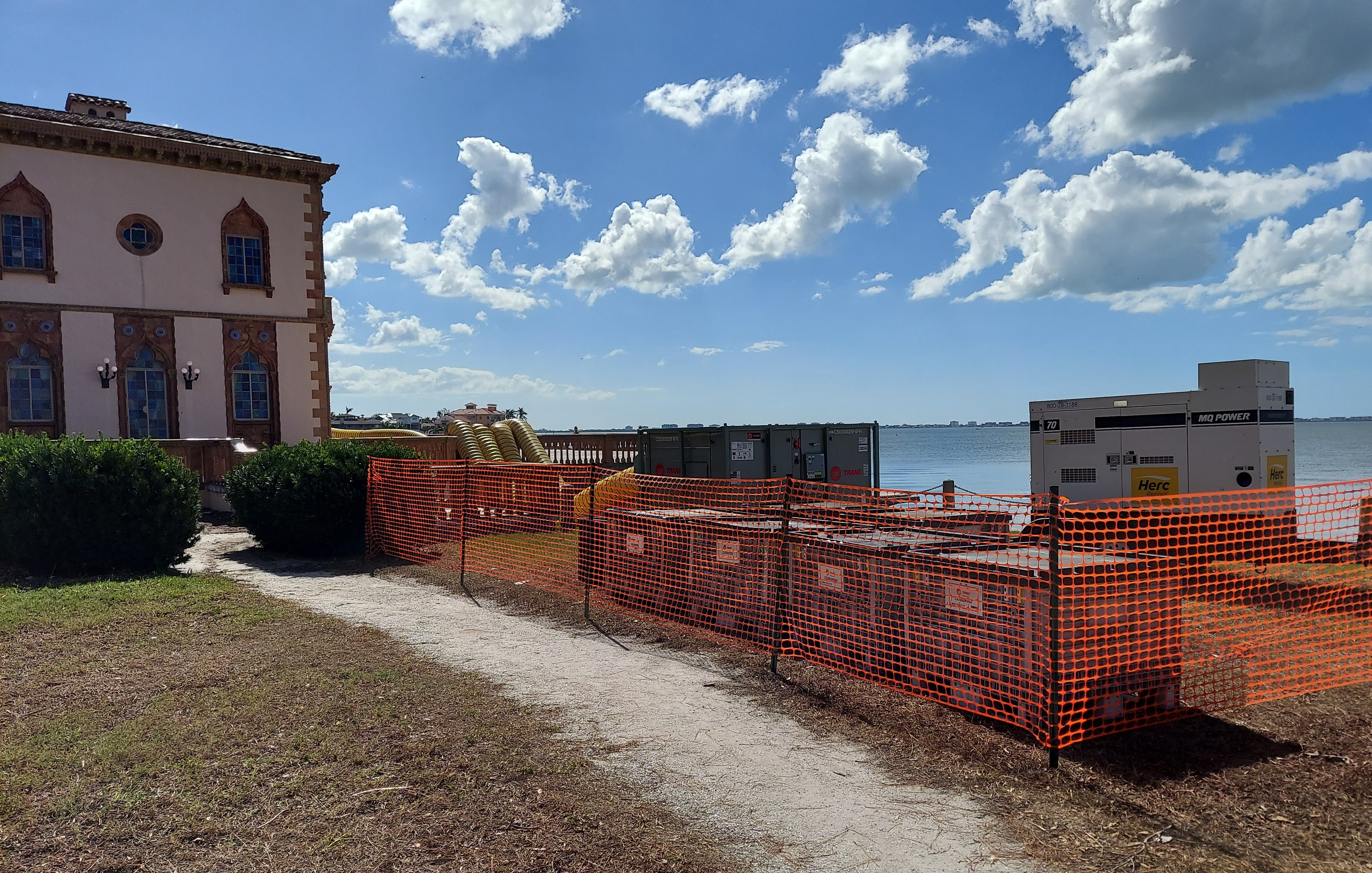
Conservators moved quickly after the 2024 hurricanes to address moisture risks in the mansion. Large tubing crossed the back terrace from the temporary HVAC units to the waterfront entrances.

Much of this preservation work is needed to combat Florida's climate and weather events. In the summer of 2020, work was done on the West façade window glass and framing structures to prevent further intrusion of water into the mansion during storms. Moisture and salt had infiltrated the failed mortar in some of the terra cotta joints, threatening architectural stability and the integrity of some interior decorative features. The 1990s updates were shored up with better caulking and metal alloy in the frames. While glass planes were sent away for careful cleaning in this round of conservation work, curators believe there are no original window glass anywhere in the mansion.

Hurricanes and water spouts have frequently threatened this waterfront edifice. In September and October 2024, Ca' d'Zan took significant damage from Hurricanes Helene and Milton which hit within two weeks of each other. Eight feet of water flooded the basement where the building's utilities are housed – including the main electric panels and the HVAC system that controls humidity and temperature in the historic building. The waterfront terrace suffered significant damage from two boats crashing into the support structures. Hurricane Milton's high winds brought roof and window leakage, especially over John Ringling's exercise room on the second floor and the spiral staircase by the kitchen. Staff acted quickly to prevent moisture damage for the 99-year old decoratively painted wood ceilings and plaster walls. An rented HVAC system was acquired and installed by the seawall north of the house with help from the museum's FSU partners to address humidity and temperature control needs. The aging climate control system in the basement was due to be replaced in 2025, and plans were expedited to accomplish that. The mansion was closed to visitors indefinitely after Hurricane Helene in the last week of September 2024.

== Gallery ==
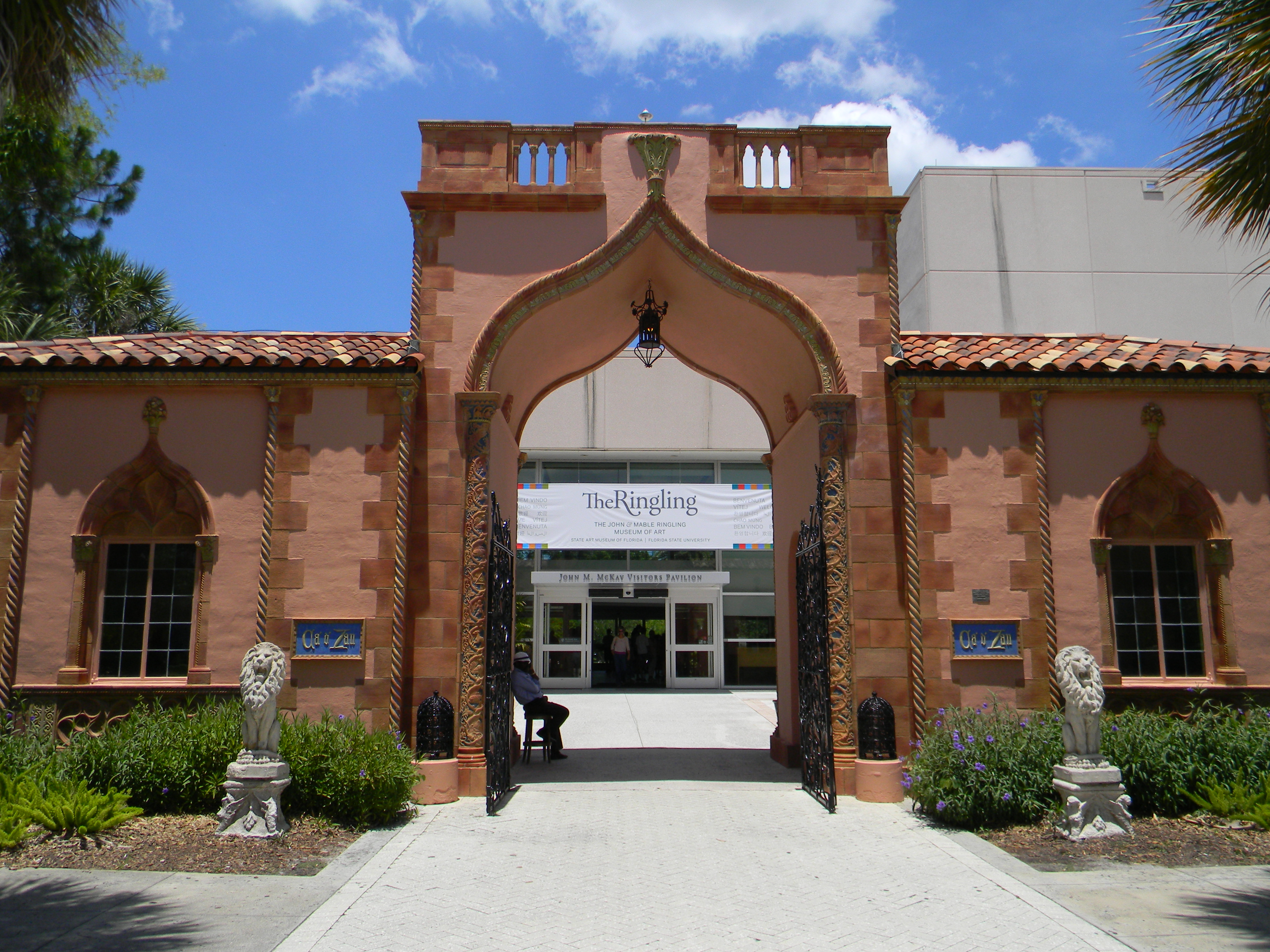
Original Gateway to the Residence

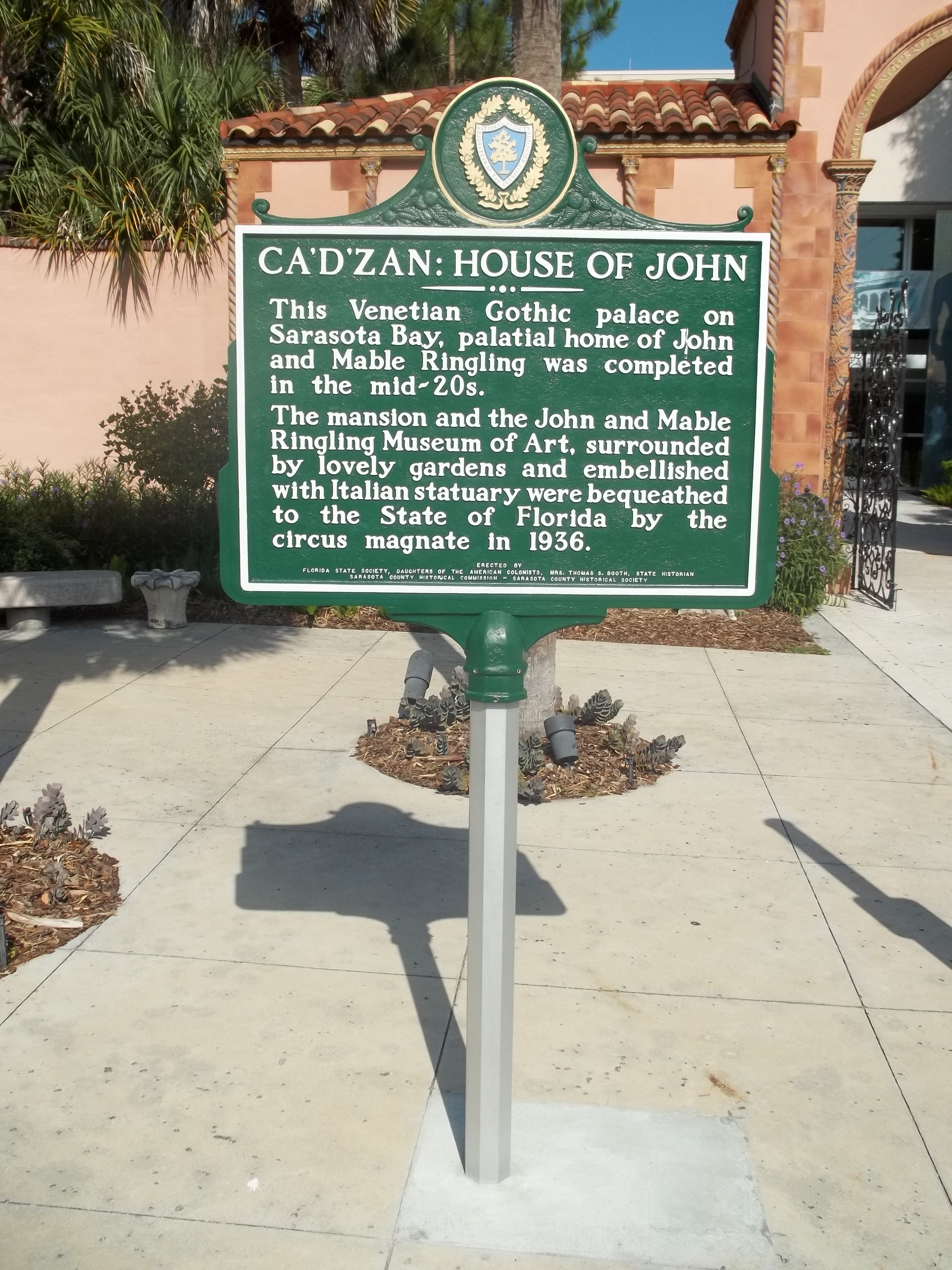
Historic Marker

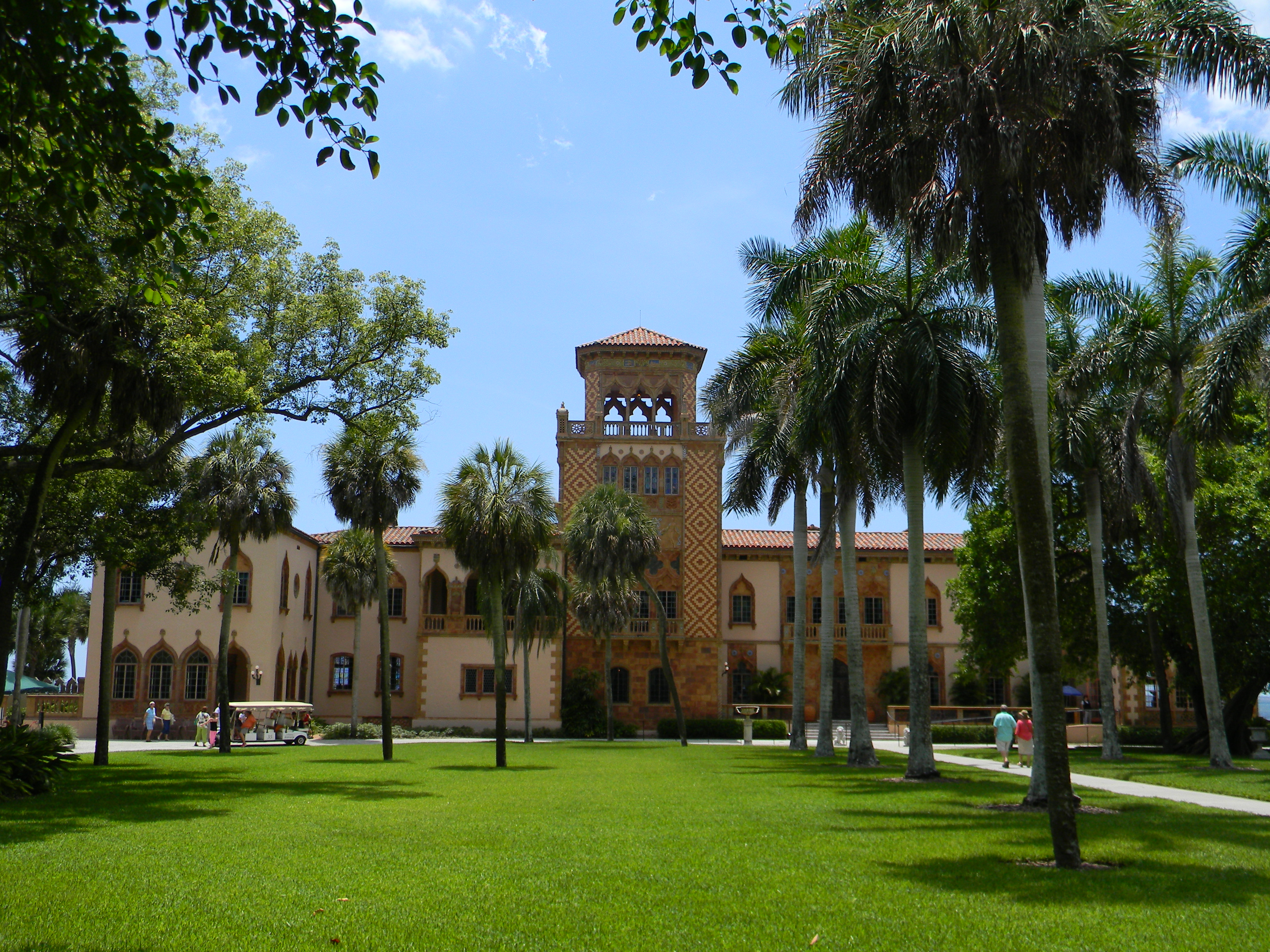
Front of Residence

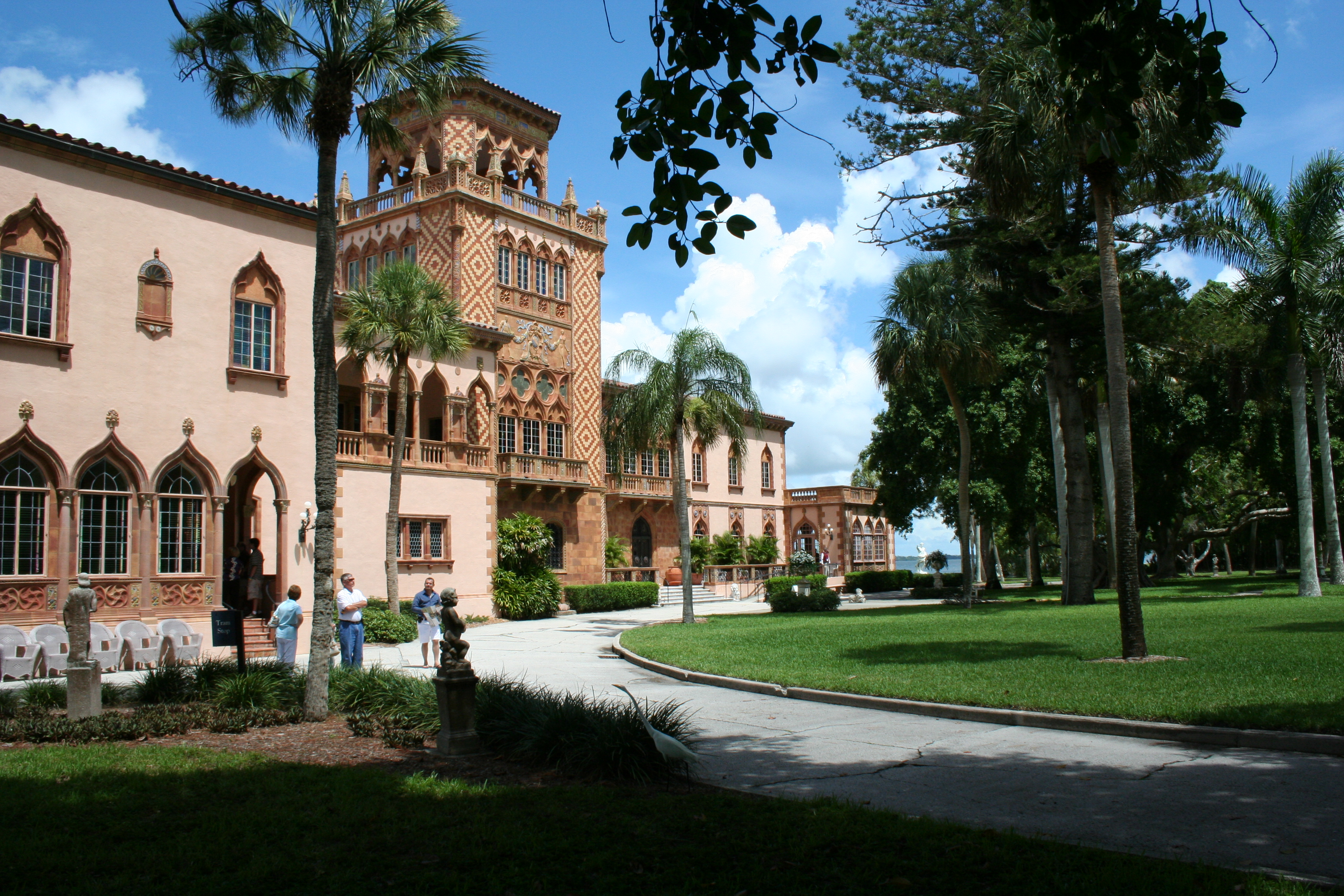
Front of Residence

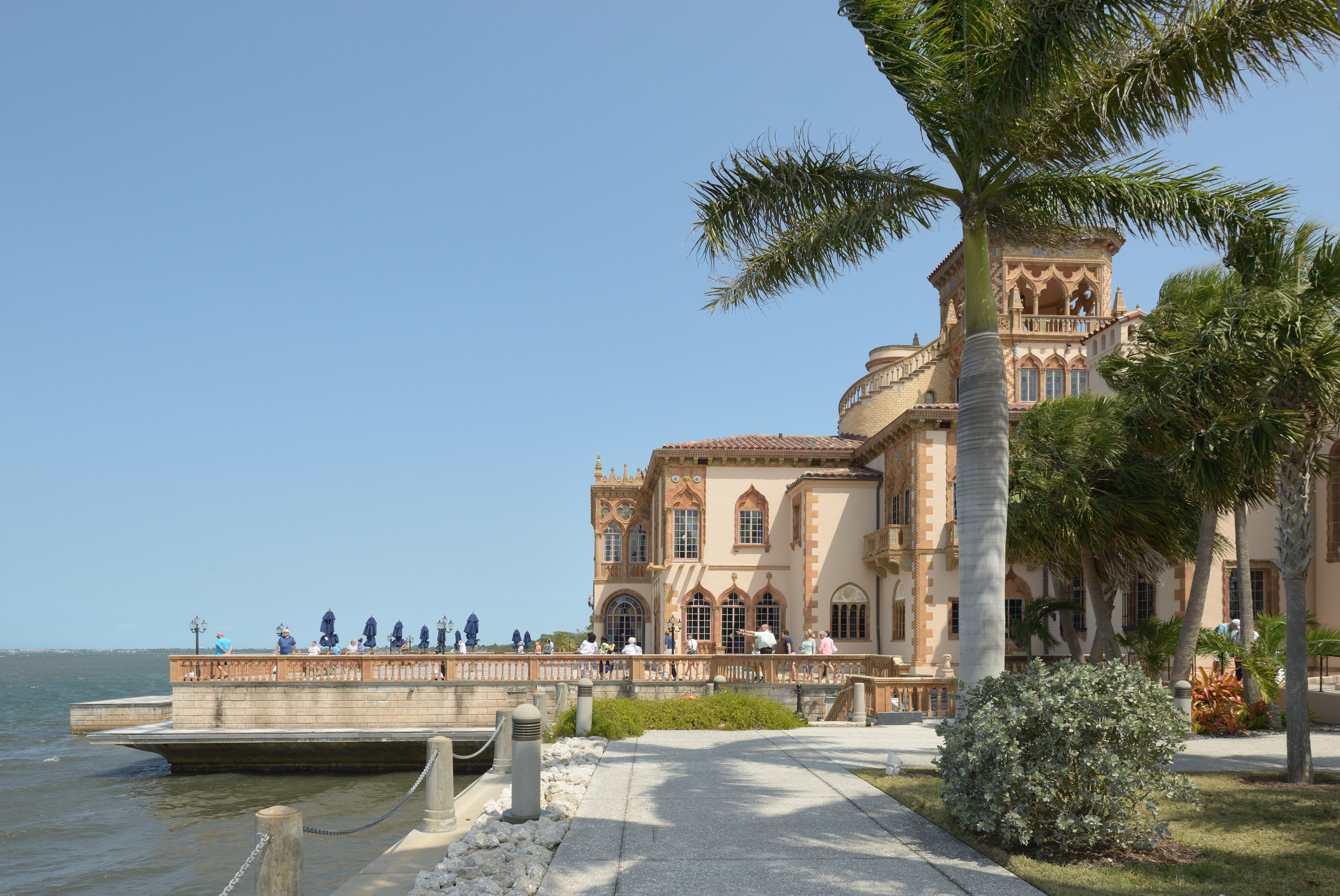
View from Bayfront

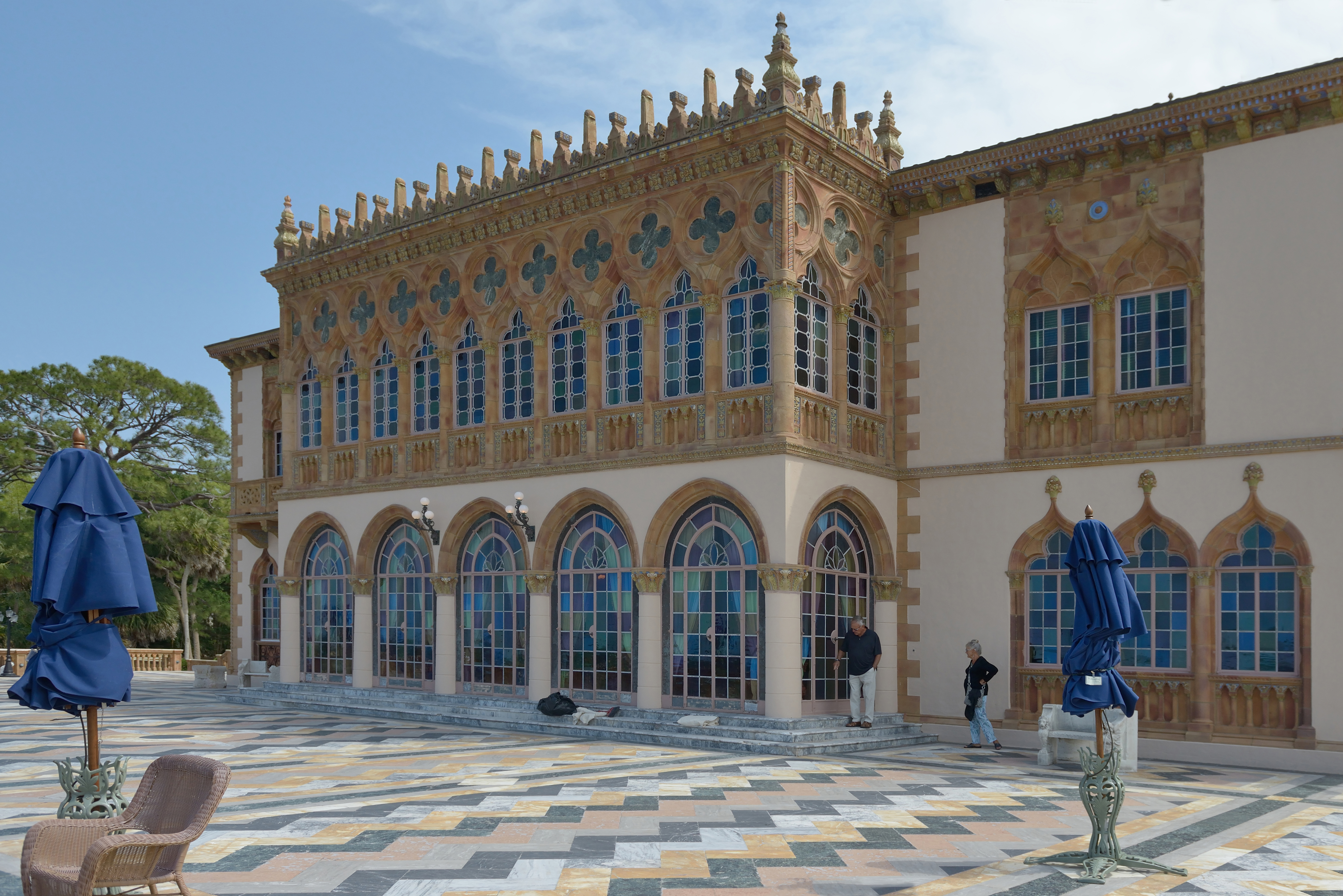
Rear of Residence

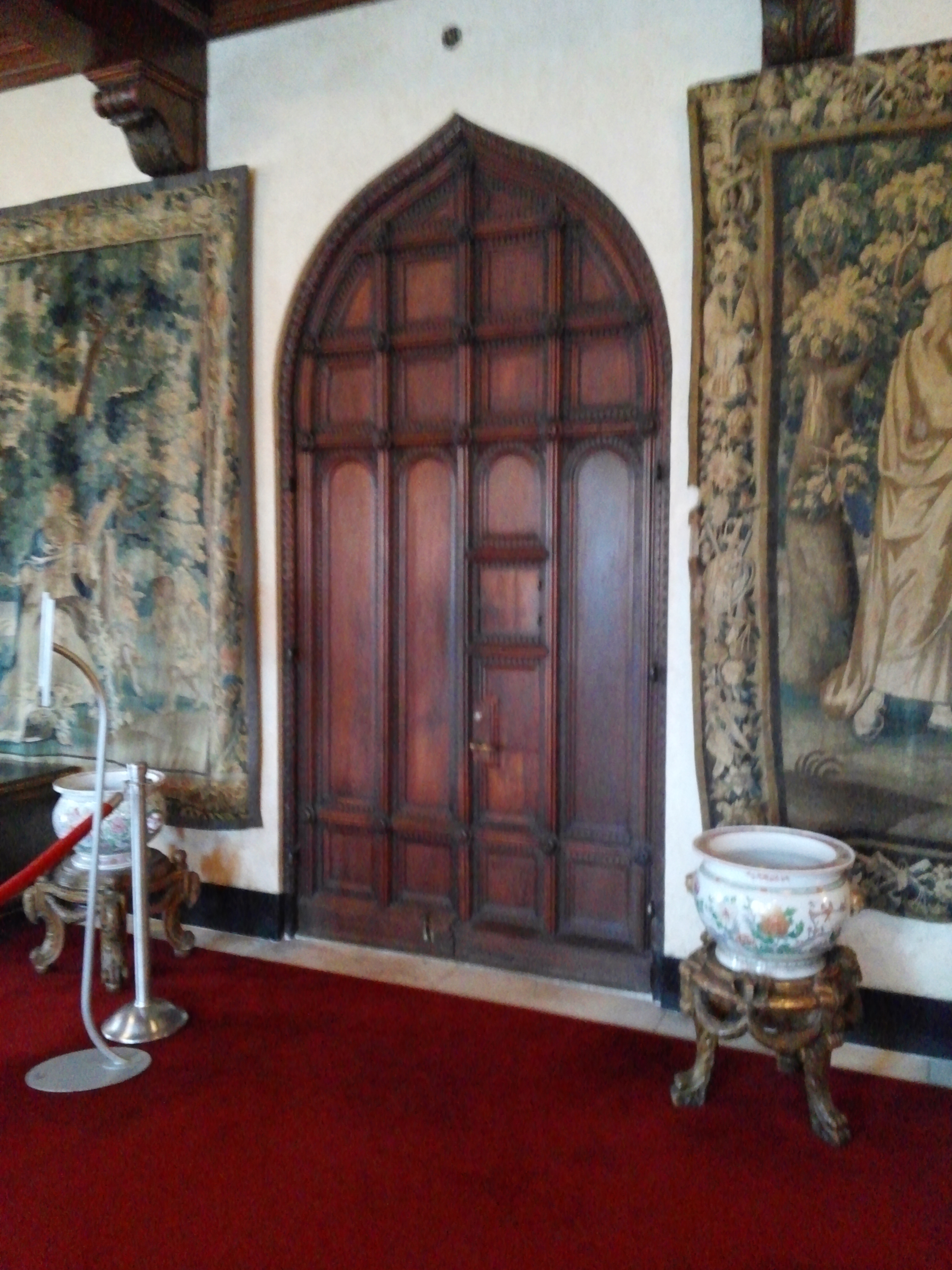
Front Door (inside)

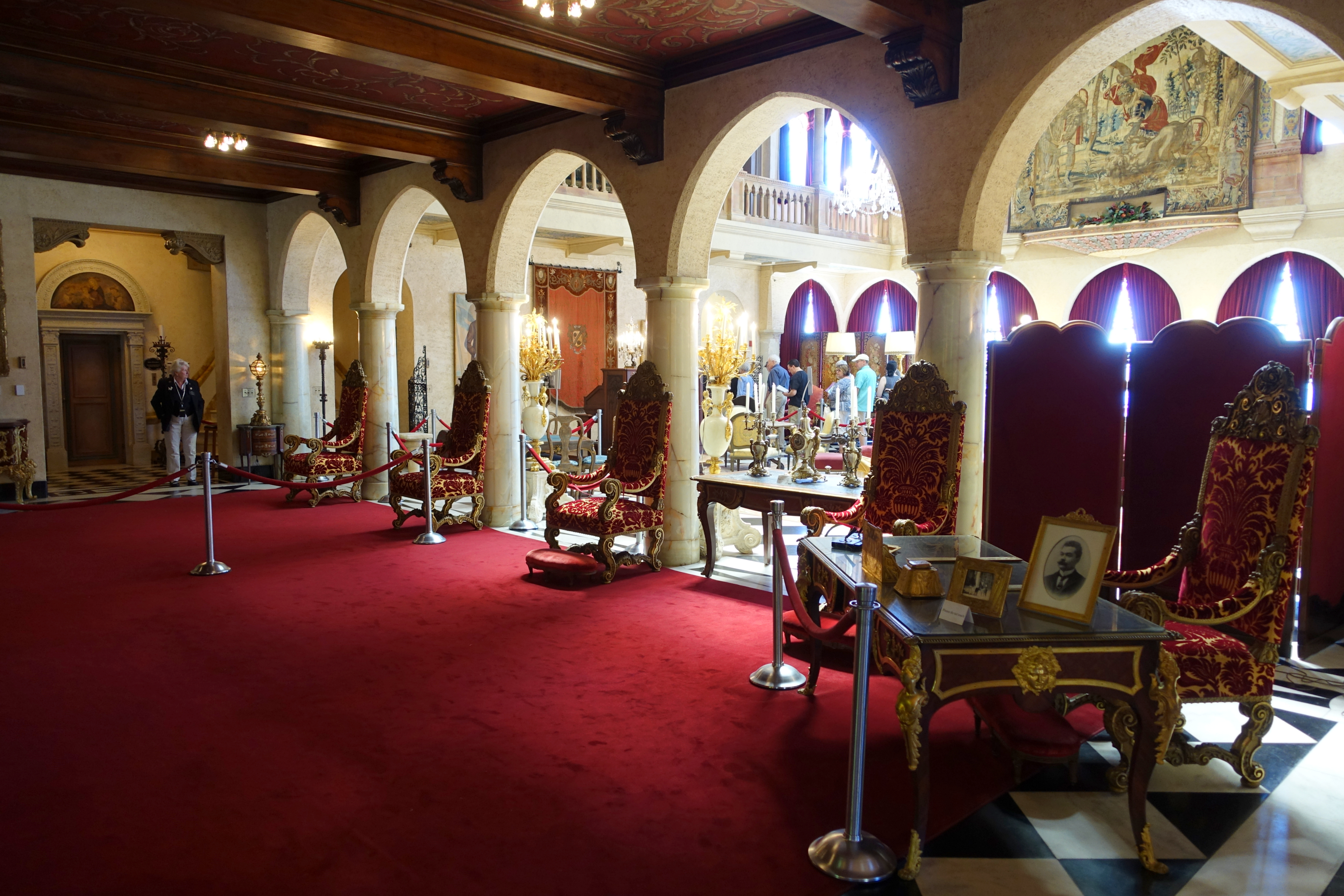
Entrance Foyer

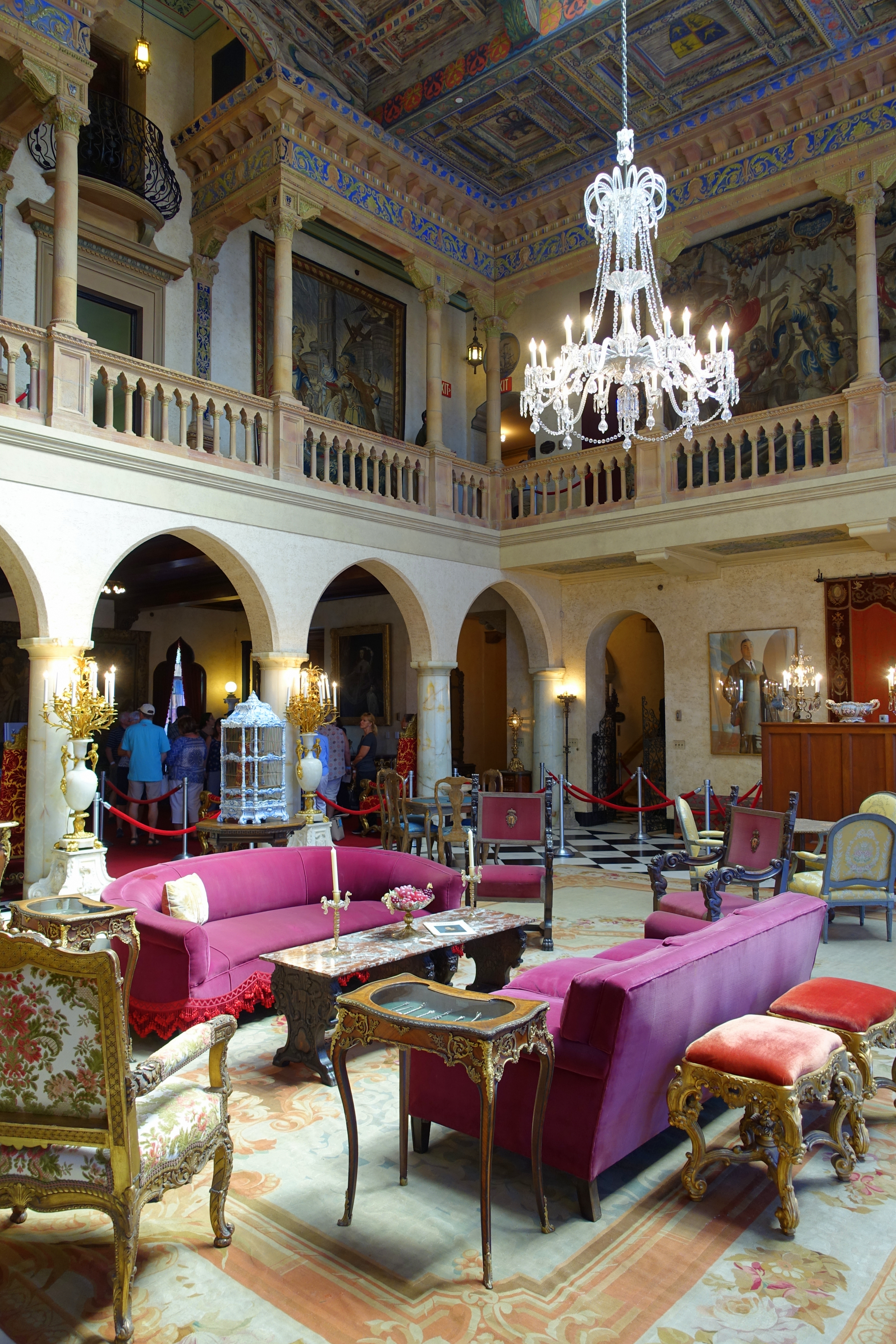
Court

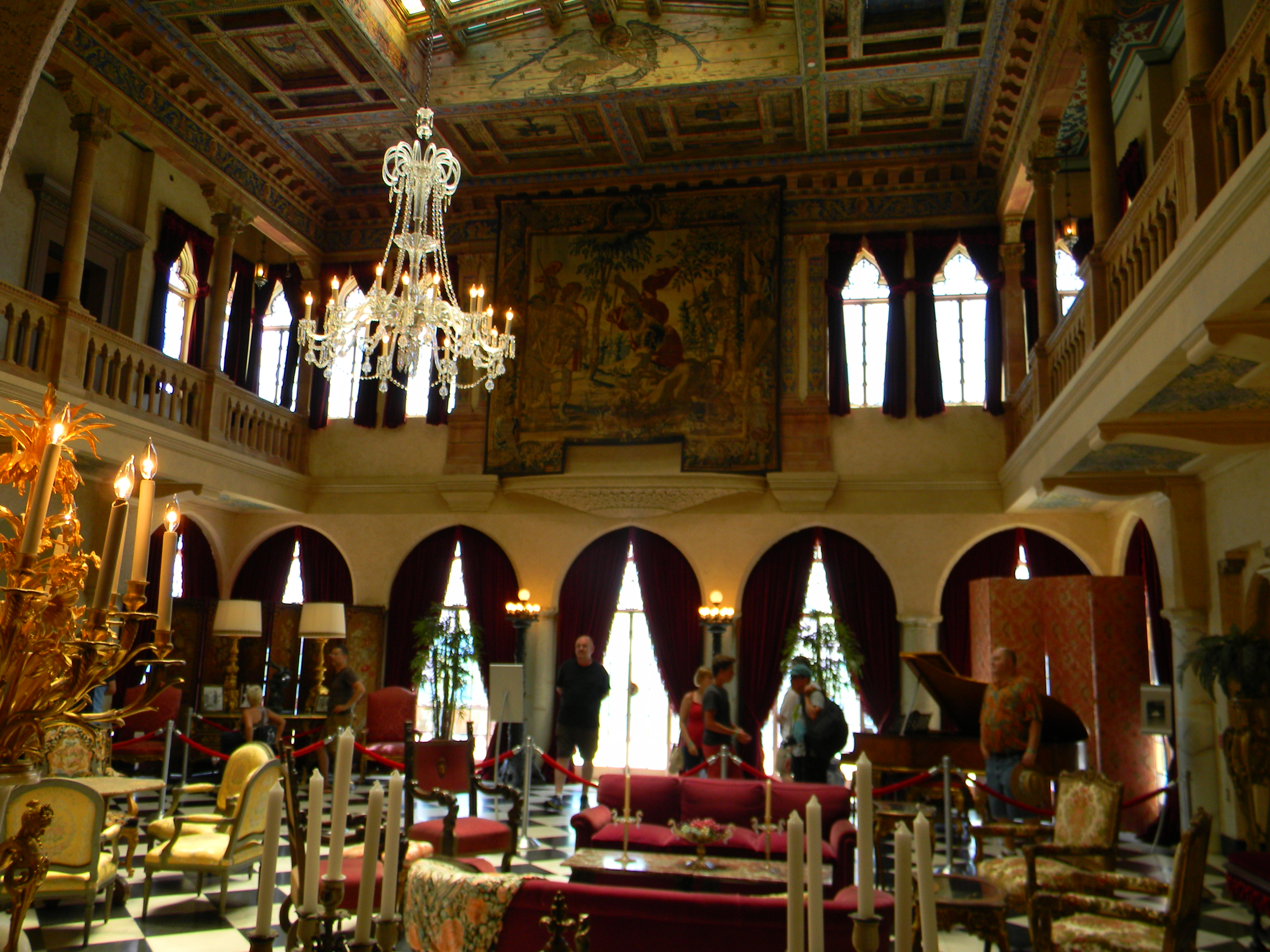
Court

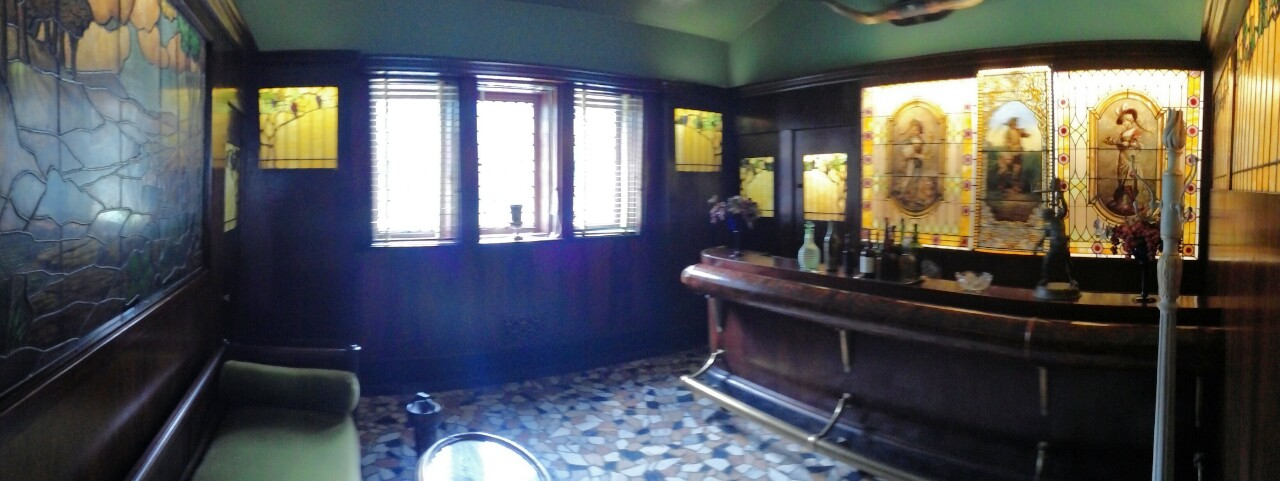
Tap Room

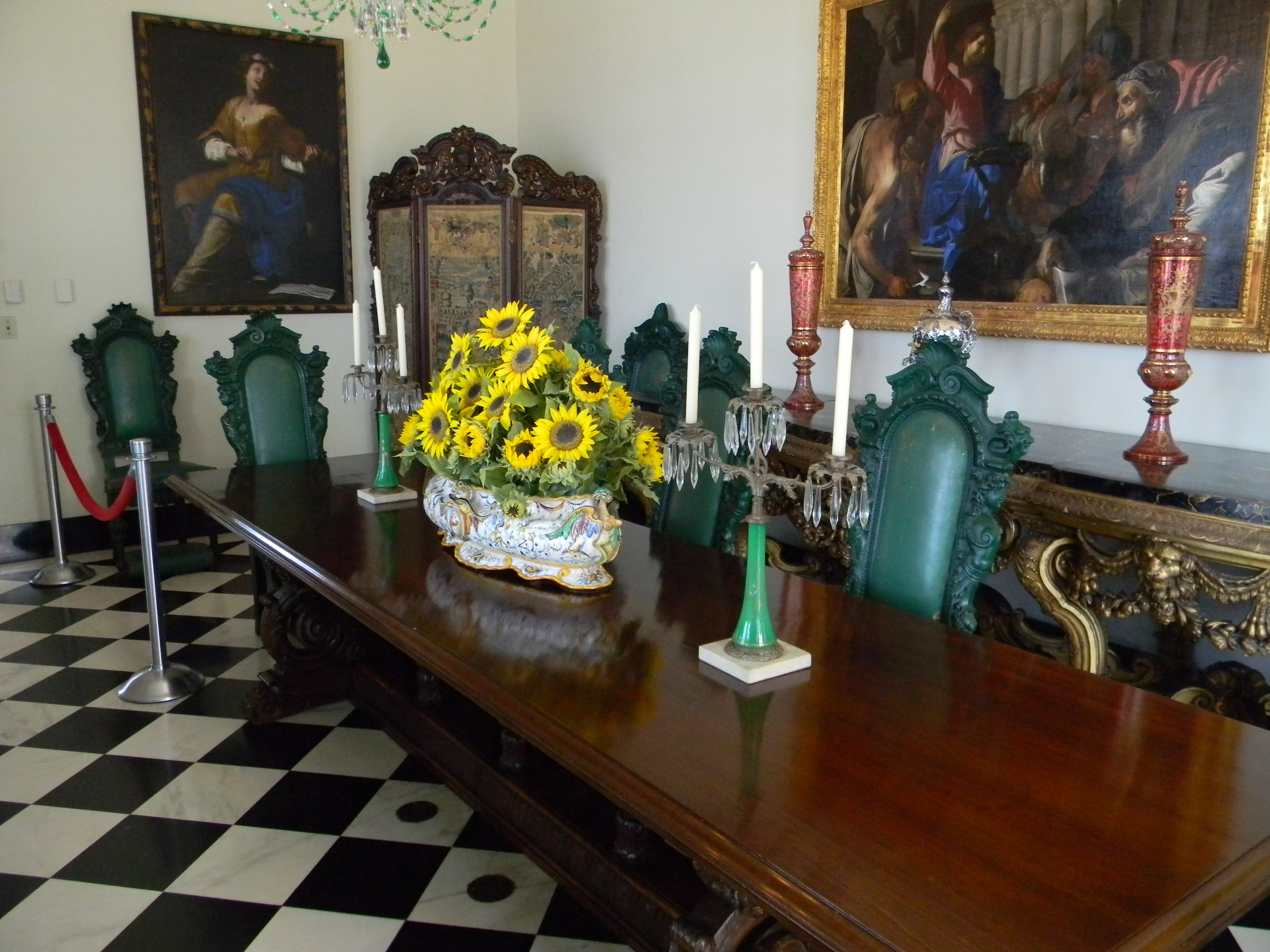
Breakfast Room

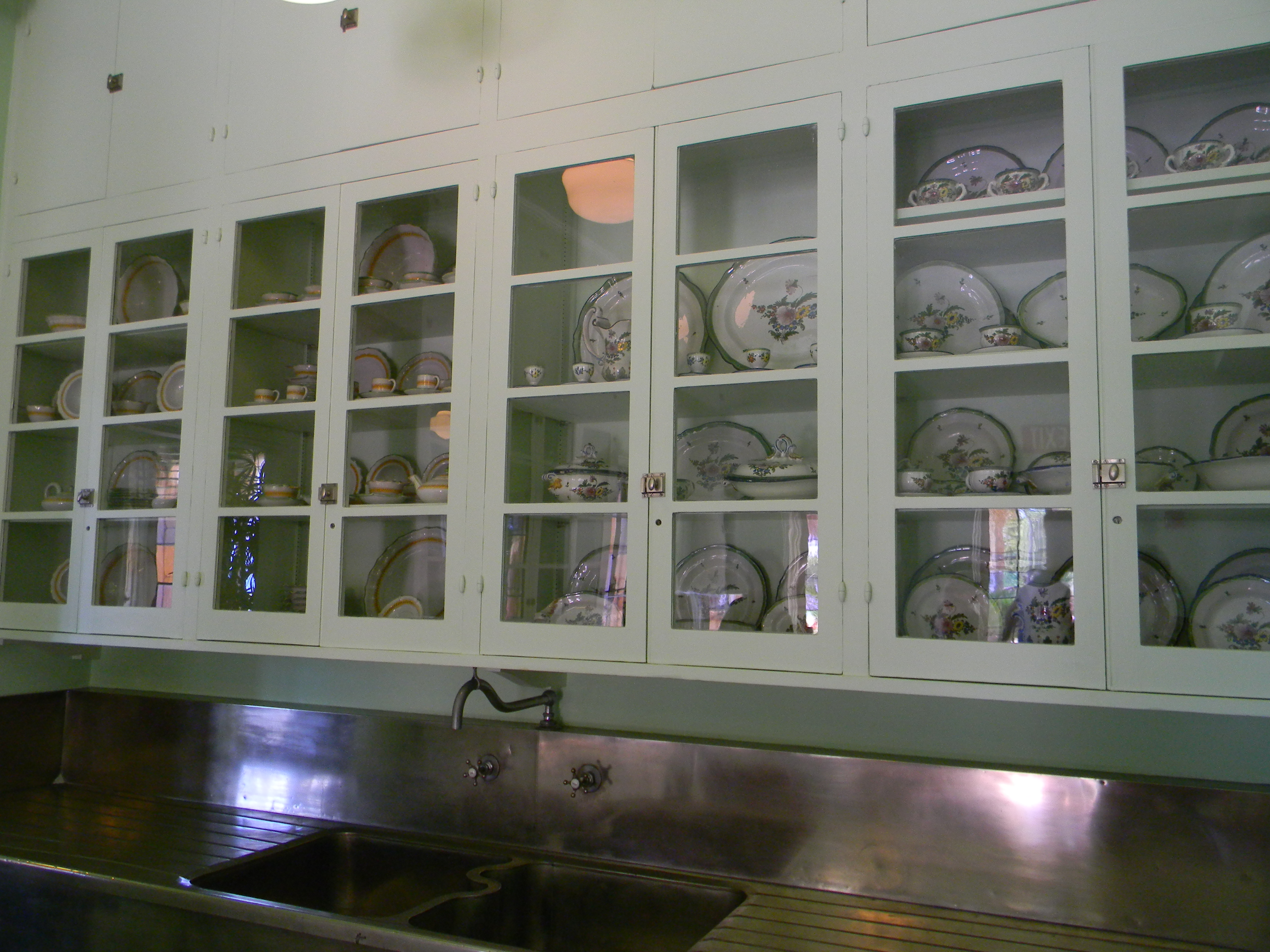
Kitchen

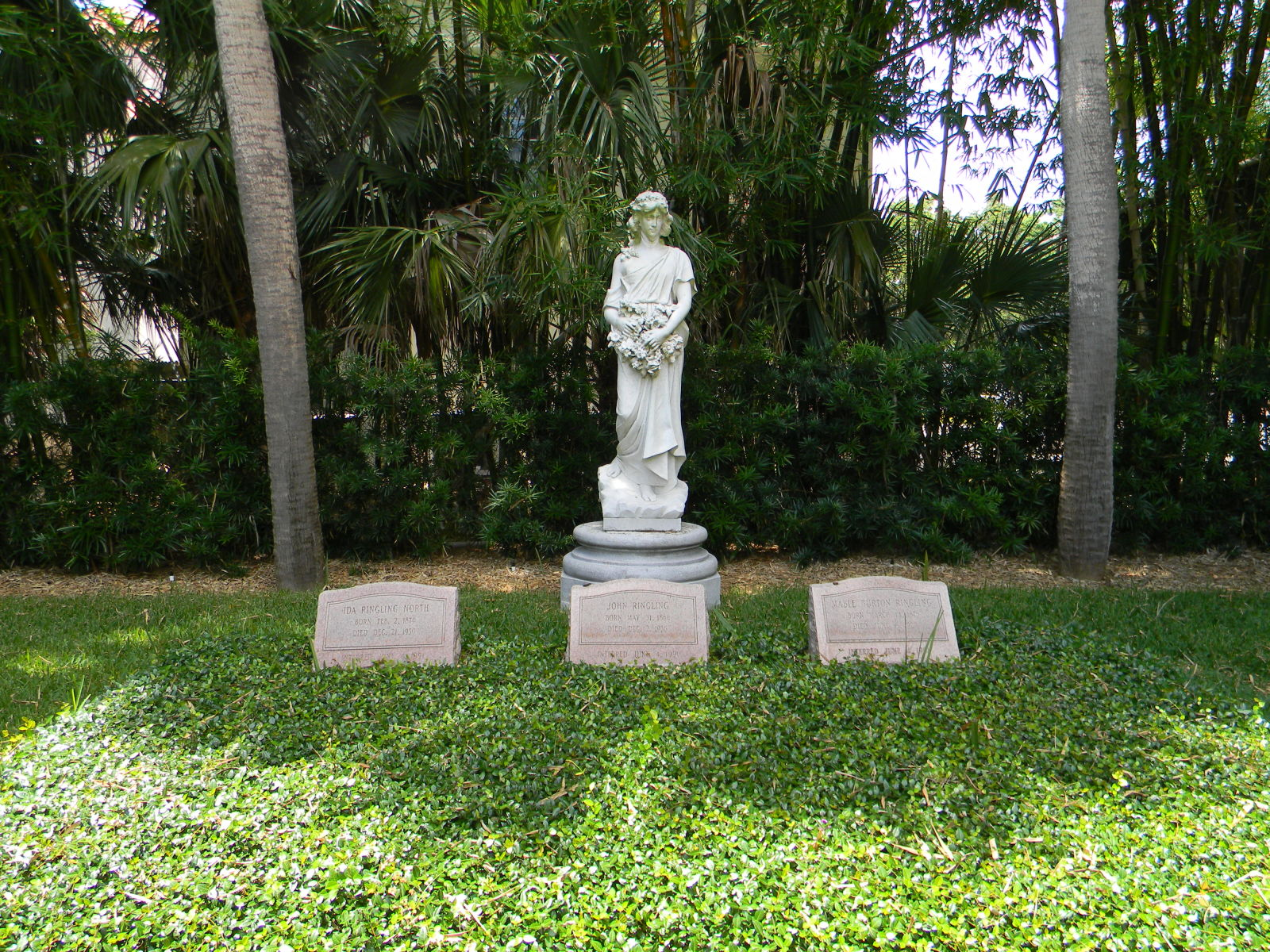
John Ringling Family Cemetery

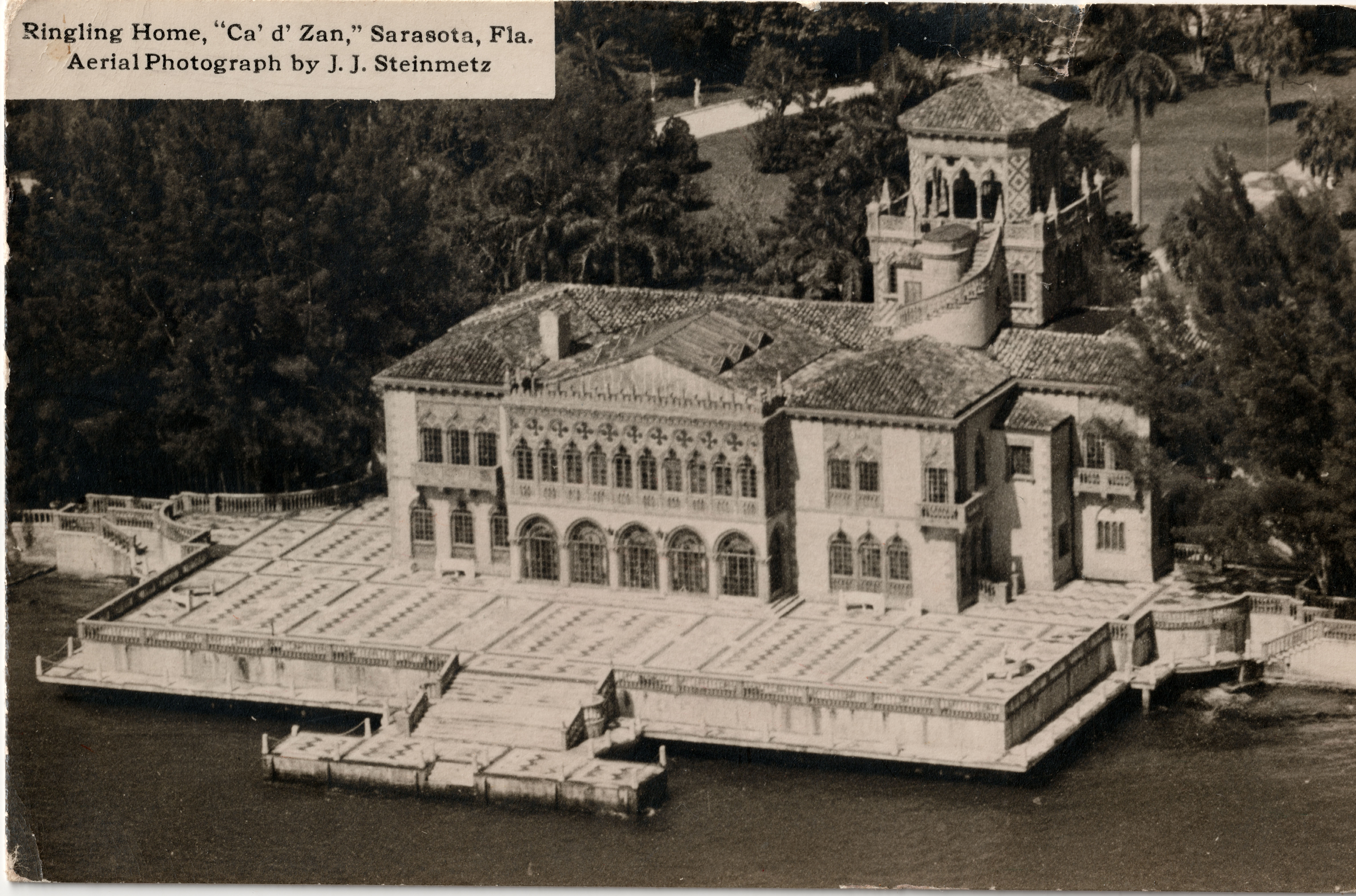
Ca' d' Zan circa 1940s
