= SS John Ringling =

Liberty ship of WWII

History

United States
- Name: John Ringling
- Namesake: John Ringling
- Owner: War Shipping Administration (WSA)
- Operator: Luckenbach Steamship Co., Ltd.
- Ordered: as type (EC2-S-C1) hull, MC hull 2494
- Awarded: 23 April 1943
- Builder: St. Johns River Shipbuilding Company, Jacksonville, Florida
- Cost: $1,001,188
- Yard number: 58
- Way number: 4
- Laid down: 1 August 1944
- Launched: 10 September 1944
- Sponsored by: Ida Loraina Wihelmina North
- Completed: 23 September 1944
- Identification: Call sign: KSTC
- Fate: Laid up in the National Defense Reserve Fleet, Beaumont, Texas, 3 September 1948; Sold for scrapping, 22 February 1972, withdrawn from fleet, 16 March 1972

General characteristics
- Class & type: Liberty ship; type EC2-S-C1, standard
- Tonnage: 10,865 LT DWT; 7,176 GRT
- Displacement: 3,380 long tons (3,434 t) (light); 14,245 long tons (14,474 t) (max)
- Length: 441 feet 6 inches (135 m) oa; 416 feet (127 m) pp; 427 feet (130 m) lwl
- Beam: 57 feet (17 m)
- Draft: 27 ft 9.25 in (8.4646 m)
- Installed power: 2 × Oil fired 450 °F (232 °C) boilers, operating at 220 psi (1,500 kPa); 2,500 hp (1,900 kW)
- Propulsion: 1 × triple-expansion steam engine, (manufactured by General Machinery Corp., Hamilton, Ohio); 1 × screw propeller
- Speed: 11.5 knots (21.3 km/h; 13.2 mph)
- Capacity: 562,608 cubic feet (15,931 m^{3}) (grain); 499,573 cubic feet (14,146 m^{3}) (bale)
- Complement: 38–62 USMM; 21–40 USNAG
- Armament: Varied by ship; Bow-mounted 3-inch (76 mm)/50-caliber gun; Stern-mounted 4-inch (102 mm)/50-caliber gun; 2–8 × single 20-millimeter (0.79 in) Oerlikon anti-aircraft (AA) cannons and/or, 2–8 × 37-millimeter (1.46 in) M1 AA guns

SS John Ringling was a Liberty ship built in the United States during World War II. She was named after John Ringling, an American entrepreneur who is the best known of the seven Ringling brothers, five of whom merged the Barnum & Bailey Circus with their own Ringling Bros World's Greatest Shows. In addition to owning and managing many of the largest circuses in the United States, he was also a rancher, a real estate developer and art collector.

== Construction ==
John Ringling was laid down on 1 August 1944, under a Maritime Commission (MARCOM) contract, MC hull 2494, by the St. Johns River Shipbuilding Company, Jacksonville, Florida; she was sponsored by Ida Loraina Wihelmina North, the sister of the namesake, and was launched on 10 September 1944.

== History ==
She was allocated to the Luckenbach Steamship Co., Ltd., on 23 September 1944. On 3 September 1948, she was laid up in the National Defense Reserve Fleet, Beaumont, Texas. She was sold for scrapping, 22 February 1972, to Andy Equipment, Inc., for $39,333. She was removed from the fleet, 16 March 1972.

== Bibliography ==
- "St. John's River Shipbuilding, Jacksonville FL". www.ShipbuildingHistory.com. 16 October 2010.
- Maritime Administration. "John Ringling". Ship History Database Vessel Status Card. U.S. Department of Transportation, Maritime Administration.
- Davies, James (May 2004). "Specifications (As-Built)" (PDF). p. 23.
- "SS John Ringling".
