= Mable Burton Ringling =

American art collector

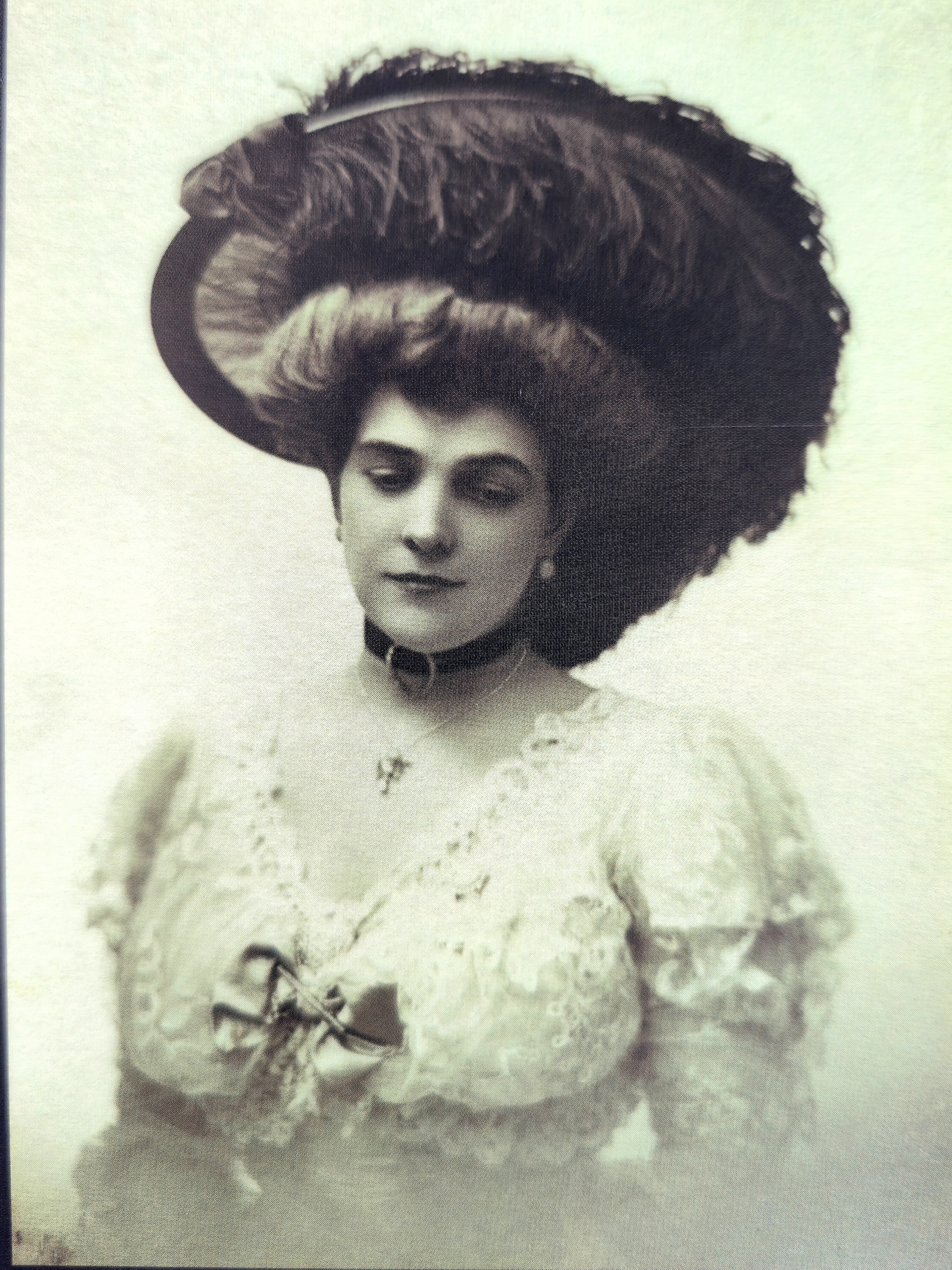
- Ringling in 1905
- Born: Armelda Burton; March 14, 1875; Moons, Ohio, U.S.
- Died: June 8, 1929 (aged 54); New York City, U.S.
- Occupation: Art collector
- Known for: Created the John and Mable Ringling Museum of Art, oversaw construction of the historic Ca'D'Zan mansion.

Mable Burton Ringling (March 14, 1875 – June 8, 1929) was an American art collector who with her husband created the John and Mable Ringling Museum of Art.

== Biography ==
Armelda Burton was born in Moons, Ohio, on March 14, 1875.

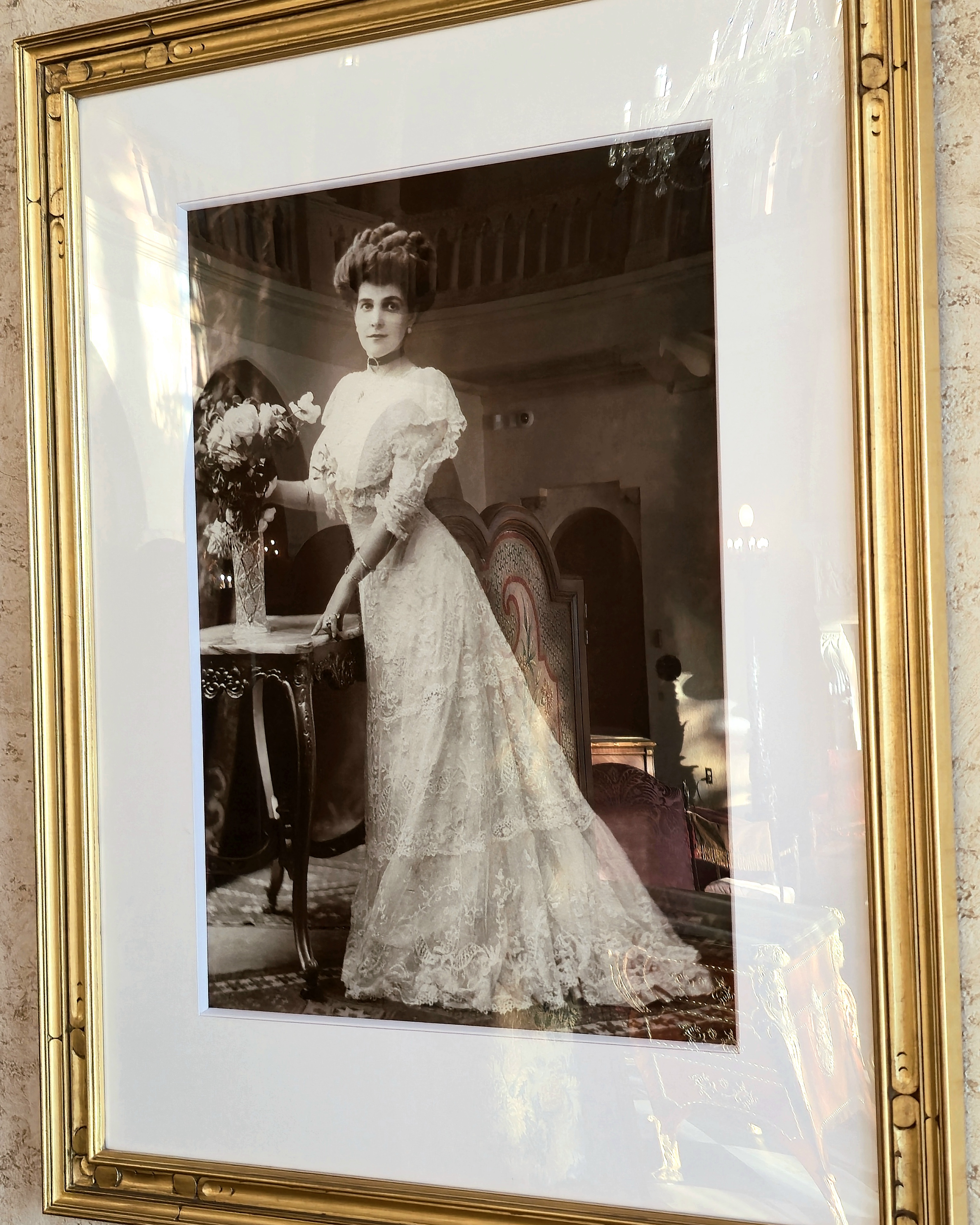
Mable Burton Ringling, 1905 photographed portrait, reflecting the interior of the Ca'ad'Zan great hall

She had four sisters and one brother. Mable left her Ohio factory job and headed to Chicago in pursuit of a husband. There she met John Nicholas Ringling. They wed in Hoboken, New Jersey, when Mable was 30 and John was 39 years old.

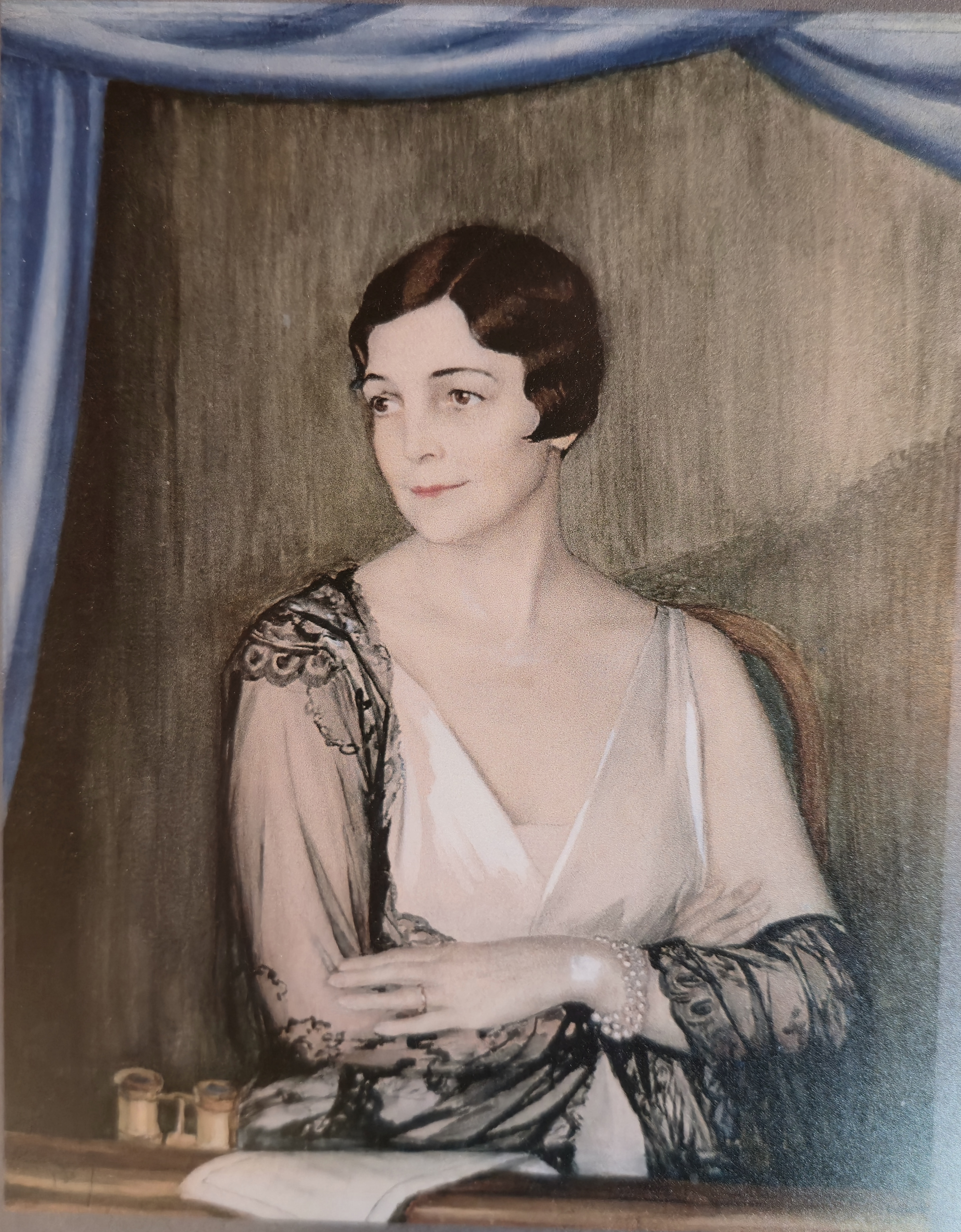
Mable Burton Ringling, Watercolor Portrait, 1927

In 1924, John and Mable began the creation of their dream home in Sarasota, Florida. They called the house Cà d'Zan, meaning 'House of John'. Mable, however, played a much larger role in the creation of the home. In fact, the blueprints were titled Mrs. John Ringling's Home. Two years and one and a half million dollars later the home was finished. Mable hand picked items for her home at estate auctions and on her travels to Europe. She filled the home with Venetian style decor and several shades of green, because green was her favorite color. Her rose garden was her passion, and she chose to have her room face her beloved rose garden rather than face the Sarasota Bay. John and Mable never had children, but they had a passion for their animals. Mable had gates installed in the home, so the pets could roam through the house while being kept out of the eating areas. She died on June 8, 1929, at the age of fifty-four due to Addison's disease and diabetes. In 1991, John and Mable Ringling and his sister, Ida Ringling North, were moved and buried at the John and Mable Ringling Museum of Art, just in front and to the right of the Ca d'Zan. It is behind the Secret Garden.
