= Charles Edward Ringling =

American circus proprietor

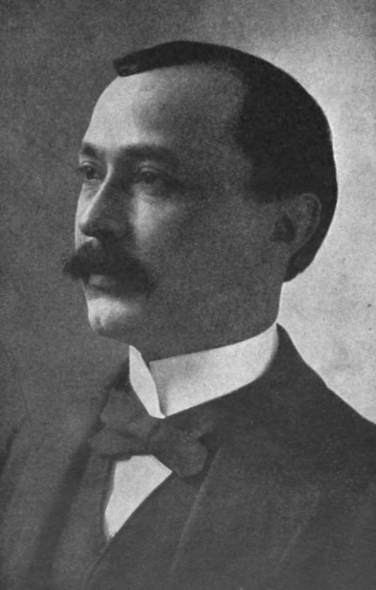
- Born: Charles Edward Rüngling; December 2, 1863; McGregor, Iowa, US
- Died: December 3, 1926 (aged 63); Sarasota, Florida, US
- Resting place: Manasota Memorial Park, Bradenton, Florida
- Known for: Ringling Brothers Circus; Ringling Brothers and Barnum & Bailey Circus
- Spouse: Edith F. Conway
- Relatives: John Nicholas Ringling, brother Otto Ringling, brother John Ringling North, nephew

Signature
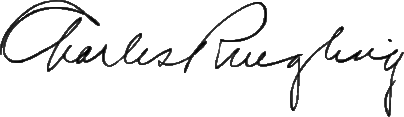

Charles Edward Ringling (December 2, 1863 – December 3, 1926) was one of the Ringling brothers, who owned the Ringling Brothers and Barnum & Bailey Circus. He was in charge of production and greatly admired by the employees, who called him "Mr. Charlie" and sought his advice and help even for personal problems.

== Sarasota, Florida development ==
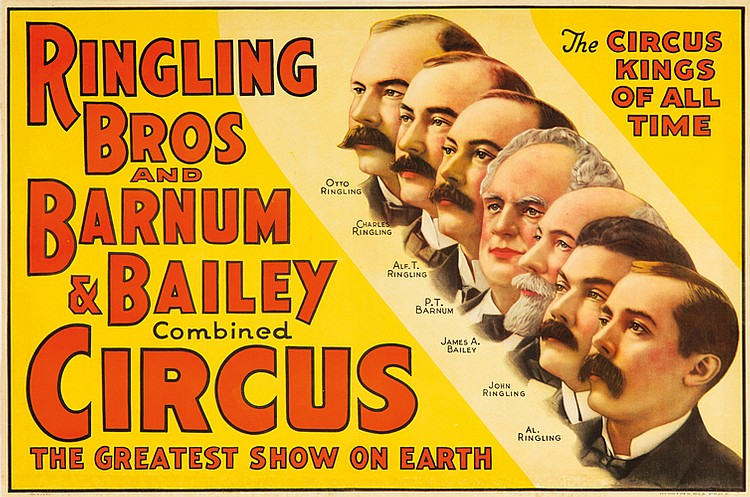

Charles Ringling bought large tracts of land in the Sarasota, Florida area, including the Gillespie Golf Course. He developed the Courthouse Subdivision, which extended the business center of Sarasota beyond the bay front. He donated land for a courthouse to serve as the county seat for the newly created, Sarasota County. He built the high-rise Sarasota Terrace Hotel near the railroad terminus and a bank through which he encouraged development in the community. Ringling Boulevard, which winds eastward from Tamiami Trail was named in honor of Charles Ringling because of his many civic activities in the community.

The winter retreat of Edith and Charles Ringling was built on Sarasota Bay in the Shell Beach subdivision platted in 1896 by Mary Louise and Charles N. Thompson. The Thompsons, associated with another circus, were instrumental in interesting members of the Ringling family about living in Sarasota.

Their retreat was completed in 1926, the year he died. Included on the property was another gracious bay front home for their daughter, Hester, and her children. As well as being intended for large social gatherings and performances, the compound was designed to be completely self-sufficient, including staff quarters, farming, and livestock. The bay front homes are connected by a covered walkway that creates a transition between the two architectural styles. Within months of the completion of the construction, Charles died, but Edith Ringling and their daughter, Hester, continued to reside on the estate for many decades. The structures on what came to be known internationally as the Edith Ringling residence, and the Hester Ringling Lancaster Sanford residence are listed on the National Register of Historic Places as part of a historic district that includes the retreat of Ellen and Ralph Caples, the retreat of Mable and John Ringling, and the John and Mable Ringling Museum of Art, as well. The homes of Edith and Hester often were featured in magazines and periodicals because of their architecture, landscaping, and interior design. The civic, musical, theatrical, and social activities of the women were of interest to readers also.

In the 1960s, New College of Florida purchased the estate for development as part of its campus and uses the historic buildings for administrative purposes and special events.

== Death ==
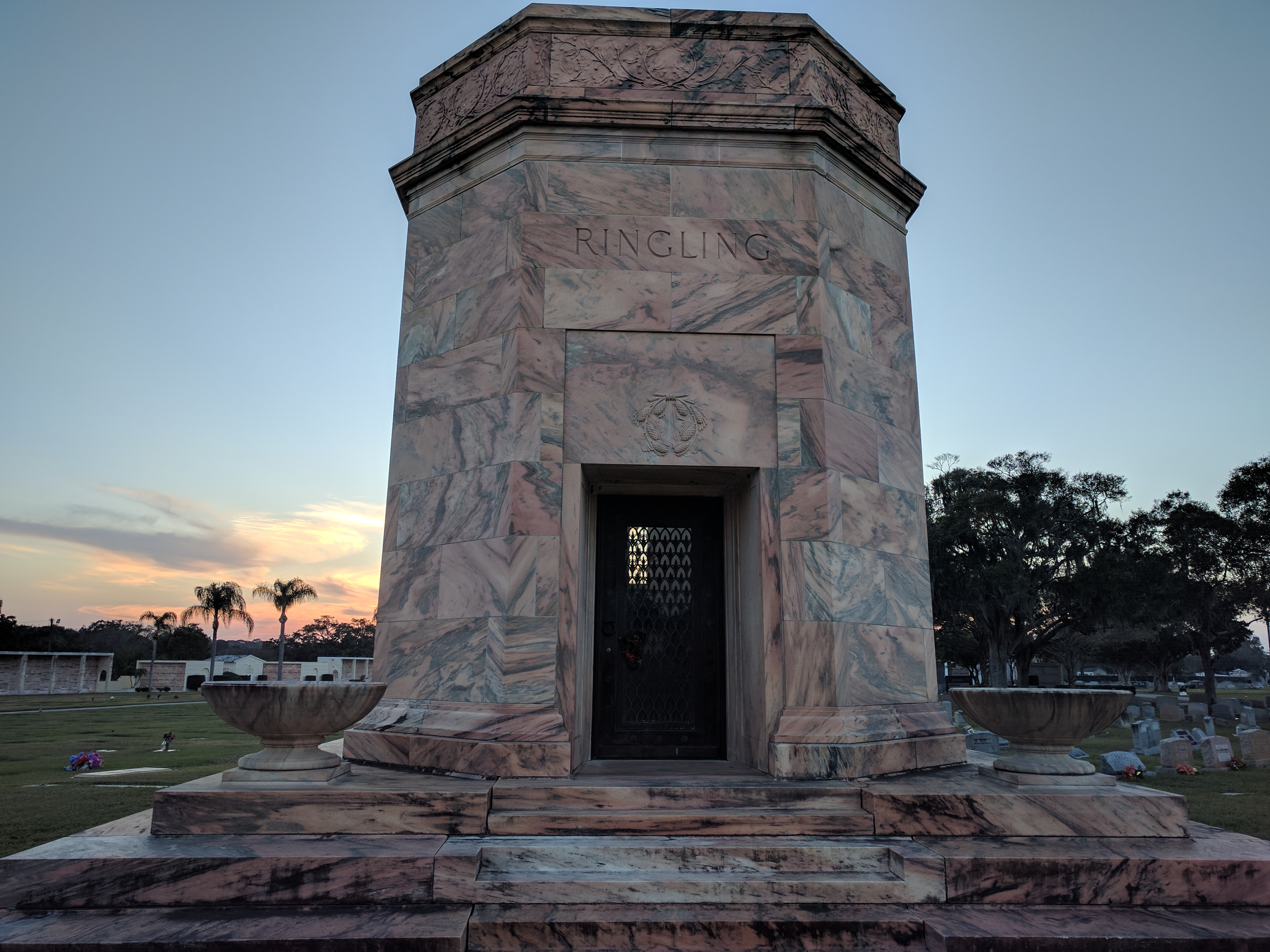
Charles Ringling mausoleum in Manasota Memorial Park

Charles Ringling died on December 3, 1926, one day after his 63rd birthday. His wife, Edith, participated in the business and was a member of the board of directors of the circus. Edith Ringling continued in that capacity after the death of Charles, assuming many additional duties that had been her husband's and thereafter, being hailed affectionately as "Mrs. Charlie" by those who relied upon her to continue his traditional roles. Charles and his wife Edith are entombed in Manasota Memorial Park (Oneco, Florida), where his casket rests inside an octagonal pink Etowah marble mausoleum.
