= John Ringling North =

Circus czar (1903–1985)

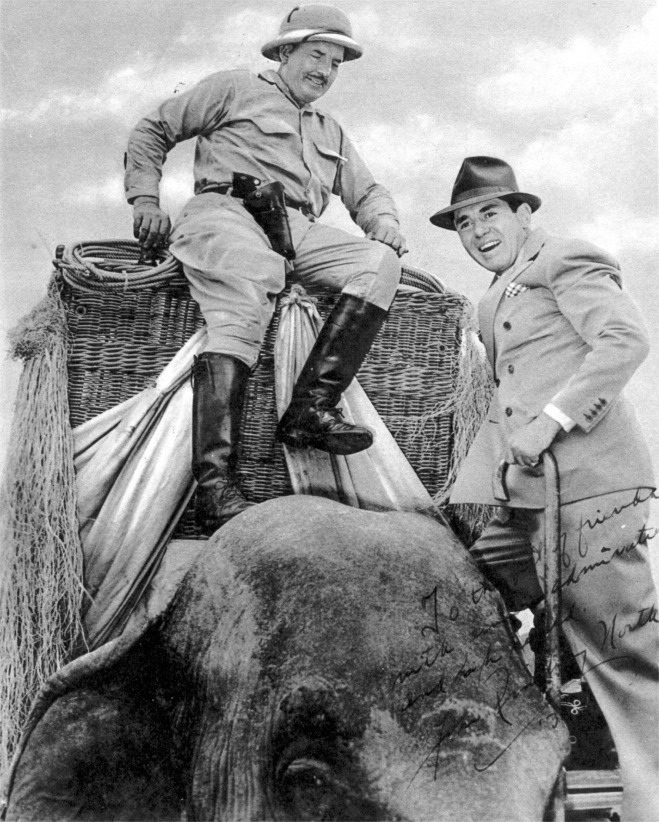
- North (right) and Frank Buck
- Born: August 14, 1903; Baraboo, Wisconsin
- Died: June 4, 1985 (aged 81); Brussels, Belgium
- Relatives: Henry Ringling North, brother John Nicholas Ringling, uncle Charles Edward Ringling, uncle Otto Ringling, uncle

John Ringling North (August 14, 1903 – June 4, 1985) was the president and director of the Ringling Bros. and Barnum & Bailey Circus from 1937 to 1943 and again from 1947 to 1967.

== Life and career ==
North was born on August 14, 1903, in Baraboo, Wisconsin, the son of Ida Loraina Wihelmina (Ringling) and Harry Whitestone North. His mother was the sister of the Ringling brothers. As a boy, he hawked balloons and novelties at his uncles' circus. He learned to dance and play the saxophone from circus performers and formed his own dance band while at college.

He attended the University of Wisconsin and Yale University, but left the latter in his junior year. After working for two years in a New York stock brokerage, North worked for the Ringling brothers' real estate companies and for the circus during the summers. He returned to the brokerage business from 1929 to 1936, while continuing to assist the Ringling brothers with their business interests. After the death of his uncle and namesake, John Ringling, the last of the original Ringling brothers in 1936, North became president and director of Ringling Brothers and Barnum & Bailey Combined Shows Inc..

Under North's management, the circus switched from tents to air conditioned venues in 1956, in part to offset rising labor costs. North also replaced the circus's unrelated acts with thematic programs, and once hired George Balanchine to choreograph a ballet using the circus's elephants. Balanchine, in turn, brought Igor Stravinsky on board to compose the Circus Polka for the elephant dance. The Ringling heirs sold the circus in 1967, ending 80 years of Ringling family control of the enterprise.

== Marriage ==
North married French actress Germaine Aussey on May 11, 1940; they divorced in 1945.

== Personal life ==
After the sale of the circus, he moved to Europe, where he lived in Switzerland and Belgium. In the early 1960s, North and his brother, Henry Ringling North, who had bought their father's ancestral home in County Galway, became Irish citizens.

== Death ==
North died of a stroke on June 4, 1985, in Brussels, Belgium, at the age of 81.
