= Henry Ringling North =

American circus proprietor

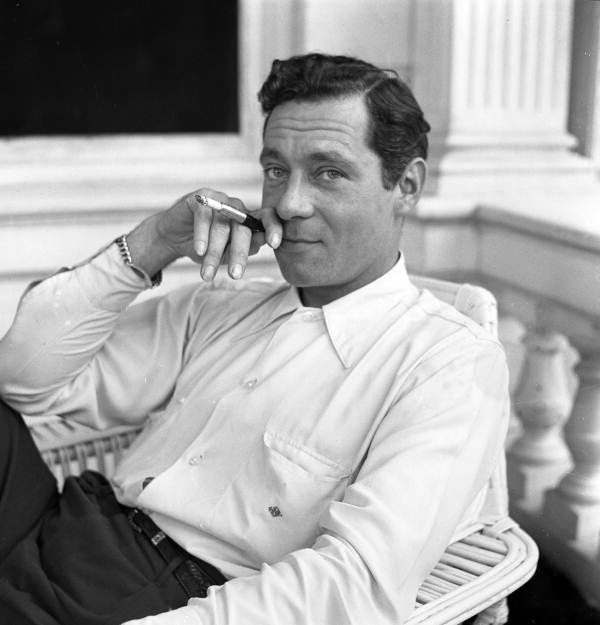
- Born: Henry Whitestone North; November 12, 1909; Chicago, Illinois, US
- Died: October 2, 1993 (aged 83); Begnins, Switzerland
- Education: Yale University (1933)
- Spouse: Gloria de la Feld
- Relatives: John Ringling North, brother John Nicholas Ringling, uncle

Henry Ringling North (November 12, 1909 – October 2, 1993) was an American businessman, as a circus proprietor who was the vice president, treasurer, director and operations chief, while his brother, John Ringling North, was the president and chairman of the Ringling Bros. and Barnum & Bailey Circus, founded by their uncles.

== Biography ==
He was born in Chicago and attended Yale University. North was awarded a Silver Star for his actions in the Navy during World War II where he served in the Office of Strategic Services. In the 1960s he became an Irish citizen. He was involved with two oil firms in Oklahoma. His first two marriages ended in divorce. He died on October 2, 1993, in Begnins near Geneva, Switzerland.

== Legacy ==
His son, John Ringling North II, is the former owner of the Kelly-Miller Circus.
