= Otto Ringling =

Co-founder of the Ringling Brothers Circus

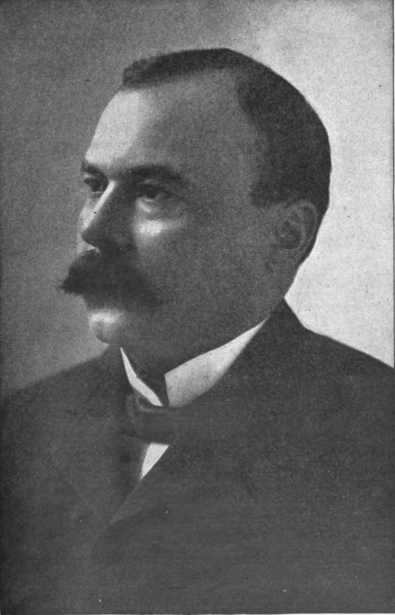
- Born: William Henry Ringling; 1858; Baraboo, Wisconsin, U.S.
- Died: March 31, 1911 (aged 52–53); Manhattan, New York, U.S.
- Occupation: Businessman

Otto Ringling (born William Henry Ringling; 1858 – March 31, 1911) was an American Circusman, businessman, and the third oldest of the Ringling brothers. He was the co-founder of the Ringling Bros. World's Greatest Shows, which eventually became the Ringling Bros. and Barnum & Bailey Circus. He was called the "Lieutenant General" of the Ringling family. Upon his death, the New York Times described him as "a man of great ideas and ambition, and an executive of force and character." He was nicknamed "The King" in the circus business.

== Early life ==
William Henry Ringling was born in 1858 in Baraboo, Wisconsin. He was nicknamed "Otto". His parents were Marie Salome (Juliar), of Ostheim, France, and Heinrich Friedrich August Ringling (1826–1898), of Hanover, Germany. He was the third of the Ringling brothers to be born, following Albert and Augustus. He was born into a musical family, with each member of the family being able to play an instrument. Baraboo became an economically unstable town, and the family relocated to Iowa.

Ringling, along with his brothers, made horse harnesses in McGregor, Iowa. Eventually, the brothers started touring in Iowa, playing music.

== Circus career and mid-life ==
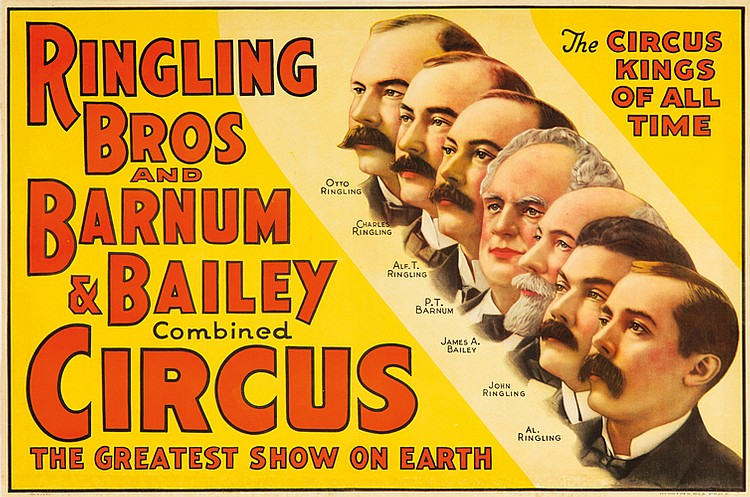
Ringling Bros and Barnum Bailey Circus Kings: Otto Ringling (pictured top)

After concert tours, the brothers got involved in the circus. During the early days of the Ringling Bros. circus, Ringling took tickets and money, and served as publicist. He was called the "Lieutenant General" by his brothers, becoming the head of the family and the family business. He was responsible for bringing the talents of his brothers, and eventually blending the merged Barnum & Bailey shows, into solid performances. He was the primary decision maker regarding the company finances and business decisions.

Ringling was described as recluse, and remained single his entire life, never marrying. He cared for horses, loved books, and studied mathematics. His favorite books were history, classics, and contemporary literature of the day. When he traveled with the circus, he had his own private train car, equipped with his own library.

== Later life and death ==
Starting in 1909, Ringling suffered from Bright's disease. In 1910, he sent John Ringling his will and testament. Ringling trusted John more than any of his brothers, as John showed the least interest in the monetary and business aspects of the family business. Ringling died suddenly, in 1911, at the home of John, located on Fifth Avenue in Manhattan, New York. He was buried in Walnut Hill Cemetery in Baraboo, Wisconsin, next to his parents.

== Legacy ==
Upon his death, he left trust money to his sister and numerous nieces and nephews. He also left money to staff members. Among his brothers, he left money and his Renault. He also requested that his portrait be removed from future promotional materials. The brothers did not remove his image, instead, they stopped using the group portraits in any of their advertising.
