= El Vernona Apartments-Broadway Apartments =

- U.S. National Register of Historic Places
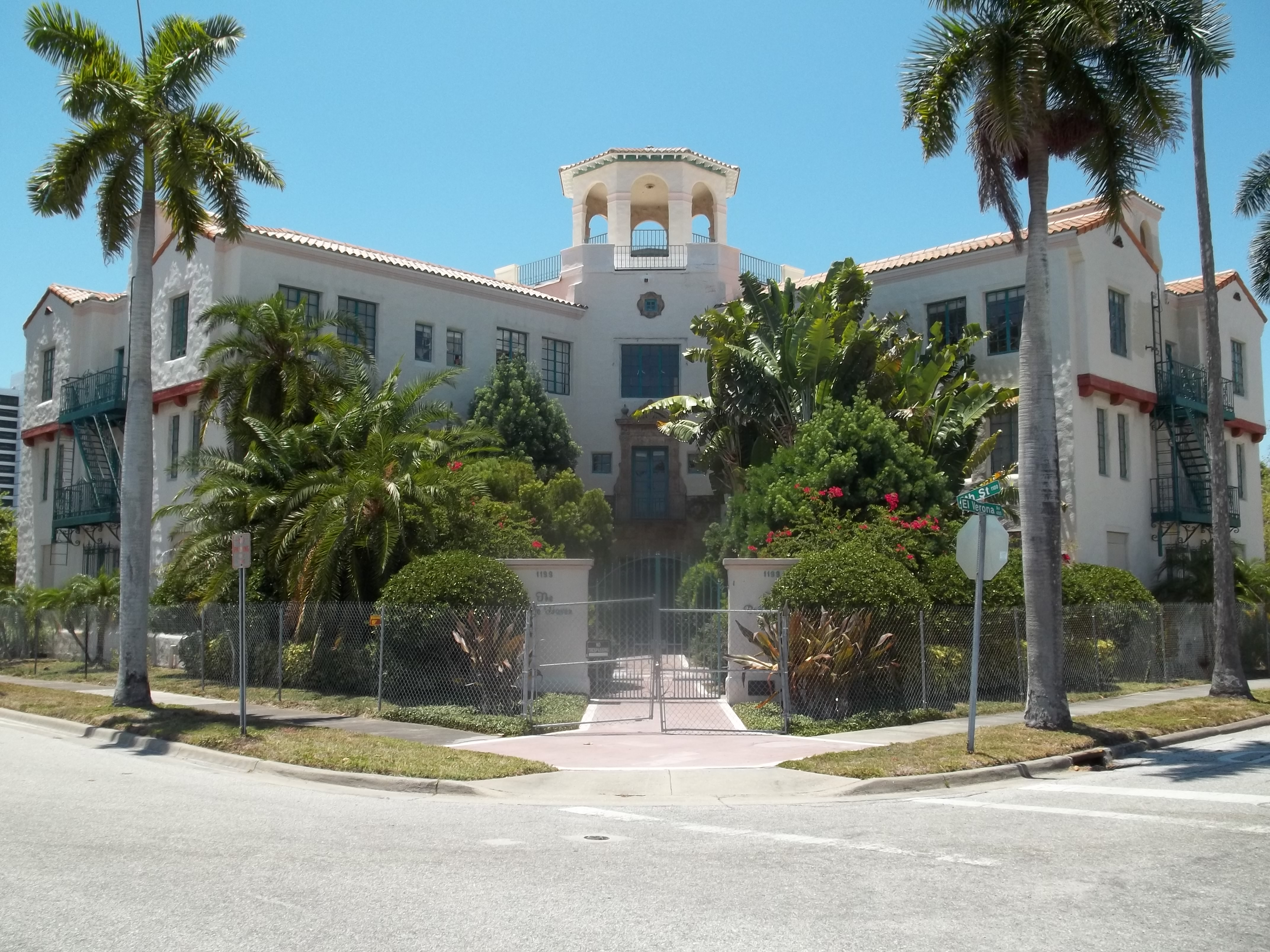
- Apartments in 2011

- Location within Florida Location within the United States
- Location: Sarasota, Florida
- Coordinates: 27°20′23″N 82°32′54″W
- Architect: Dwight James Baum
- MPS: Sarasota MRA
- NRHP reference No.: 84003836
- Added to NRHP: March 22, 1984

The El Vernona Apartments-Broadway Apartments (also known as the Belle Haven Apartments) is a historic site in Sarasota, Florida. It is located at 1133 Fourth Street. On March 22, 1984, it was added to the U.S. National Register of Historic Places.

This three-story, L-shaped plan, stucco and cast stone Mediterranean Revival building was designed by Dwight James Baum as the Broadway or El Vernona Apartments, named for Vernona Hill Freeman Burns, the wife of Owen Burns, the developer, later being known as the El Vernona Apartments-Broadway Apartments. Today, the building is commonly known as the Belle Haven. The reinforced concrete and hollow-tile construction complex was built by Ricketts and Haworth, owned by the Burns Realty Company and opened for occupancy in March 1926. The construction permit was issued for the complex by the end of October 1925 and construction materials were received by the contracting firm by December of the same year. By March 1926, the fifty-five-room complex of twenty furnished apartments was ready for occupancy and the total cost of the complex was $250,000.

The site of the apartment complex overlooking Sarasota Bay, marked the northern gateway of the Broadway Development that included the El Vernona Hotel (later known as John Ringling Towers), the Burns Realty complex, and the new headquarters of the Sarasota Times newspaper. The Broadway development was spearheaded by Owen Burns, who commissioned the architect Dwight James Baum to design the hotel, offices, and apartment for his development. The area was well-planned and unified by the selection of the Mediterranean Revival Style for all new buildings. In addition to the Broadway buildings, the architect Dwight James Baum designed the Ca' d'Zan residence for John Ringling that also was built by Burns, as well as the Sarasota County Courthouse that was donated to the county by Edith and Charles Ringling.

The Broadway or El Vernona Apartments are significant for architectural design and associations with the nationally renowned architect Dwight James Baum and the locally significant developer, Owen Burns. The Broadway Apartment is the most architecturally-intact Baum-designed building in Sarasota.

== Dwight James Baum ==
The architect of record, Dwight James Baum, a prominent New York architect who was graduated from the University of Syracuse with a degree in architecture in 1909, also designed Ca' d'Zan for John Ringling, the Sarasota County Courthouse, and various residential buildings for other Owen Burns development sites. Following the collapse of the real estate market in Sarasota, Baum worked as a consultant for the "Good Housekeeping" magazine.

The El Vernona Apartments (Belle Haven Apartments) were locally designated by the city of Sarasota in 1984.

== See also ==
- LaHurd, Jeff (2006). Sarasota: A History. Charleston, S.C.: History Press. p. 221. ISBN 978-1-59629-119-5. Chapter IV, Setting the Stage.
- LaHurd, Jeff (2005). Gulf Coast Chronicles: Remembering Sarasota's Past. Charleston, SC: History Press. ISBN 1-59629-029-3.
- Owen Burns, Sarasota History Alive!, video linked to March 14, 2012 edition
