= Powel Crosley Jr. =

American businessman (1886–1961)

- Crosley in a late 1940s advertisement
- Born: September 18, 1886; Cincinnati, Ohio, U.S.
- Died: March 28, 1961 (aged 74)
- Occupations: Inventor, industrialist, and entrepreneur
- Known for: Crosley automobile, WLW radio station, former owner of Cincinnati Reds
- Spouse(s): Gwendolyn B. Aiken (m. 1910–1939); Marianna Wallingford (m.1940-1944); Eva Emily Brokaw (m. 1952–1955)
- Children: 2
- Relatives: Lewis M. Crosley (brother)

Powel Crosley Jr. (September 18, 1886 – March 28, 1961) was an American inventor, industrialist, and entrepreneur. He was also a pioneer in radio broadcasting and owner of the Cincinnati Reds major league baseball team. In addition, Crosley's companies manufactured Crosley automobiles and radios, and operated Cincinnati radio station WLW. Crosley, once dubbed "The Henry Ford of Radio," was inducted into the Automotive Hall of Fame in 2010 and the National Radio Hall of Fame in 2013.

He and his brother, Lewis M. Crosley, were responsible for many firsts in consumer products and broadcasting. During World War II, Crosley's facilities produced more proximity fuzes than any other U.S. manufacturer and made several production design innovations. Crosley Field, a stadium in Cincinnati, Ohio, was renamed for him, and the street-level main entrance to Great American Ball Park in Cincinnati is named Crosley Terrace in his honor. Crosley's Pinecroft estate home in Cincinnati, and Seagate, his former winter retreat in Sarasota, Florida, are listed in the National Register of Historic Places.

== Early life and education ==
Powel Crosley Jr. was born on September 18, 1886, in Cincinnati, Ohio, to Charlotte Wooley (Utz) (1864–1949) and Powel Crosley Sr. (1849–1932), a lawyer. Powel Jr. was the oldest of the family's four children. Crosley became interested in the mechanics of automobiles at a young age and wanted to become an automaker. While living with his family in College Hill, a suburb of Cincinnati, 12-year-old Crosley made his first attempt at building a vehicle.

Crosley began high school in College Hill and transferred to the Ohio Military Institute. In 1904, Crosley enrolled at the University of Cincinnati, where he began studies in engineering but switched to law, primarily to satisfy his father. He dropped out of college in 1906 after two years of study.

== Marriage and family ==
Crosley married Gwendolyn Bakewell Aiken (1889–1939) in Hamilton County, Ohio, on October 17, 1910. They had two children. After his marriage, Crosley continued to work in automobile sales in Muncie to earn money to buy a house, while his wife returned to Cincinnati to live with her parents. The young couple saw each other on the weekends until Crosley returned to Cincinnati in 1911 to live and work after the birth of his first child. Gwendolyn Crosley, who suffered from tuberculosis, died at the Crosleys' winter home in Sarasota, Florida, on February 26, 1939.

Crosley married Eva Emily Brokaw (born in 1912) in 1952. She died in 1955 in Cincinnati.

=== Pinecroft ===
Pinecroft, Crosley's two-story, 13,334-square-foot (1,238.8 m^{2}), Tudor Revival-style mansion and other buildings on his estate in Mount Airy was designed by New York-based architect Dwight James Baum and built in 1928–29. Crosley's daughter, Marth Page (Crosley) Kess, sold the property after her father's death in 1961, and the Franciscan Sisters of the Poor acquired the property in 1963. Saint Francis Hospital bought a portion of the property north of the Crosley mansion in 1971 and built a hospital, which was renamed Mercy Hospitals West in 2001. The land surrounding the home has been subdivided into parcels, but the Franciscan Sisters have used the mansion as a retreat since the early 1970s. Pinecroft was added to the National Register of Historic Places in 2008.

=== Seagate ===
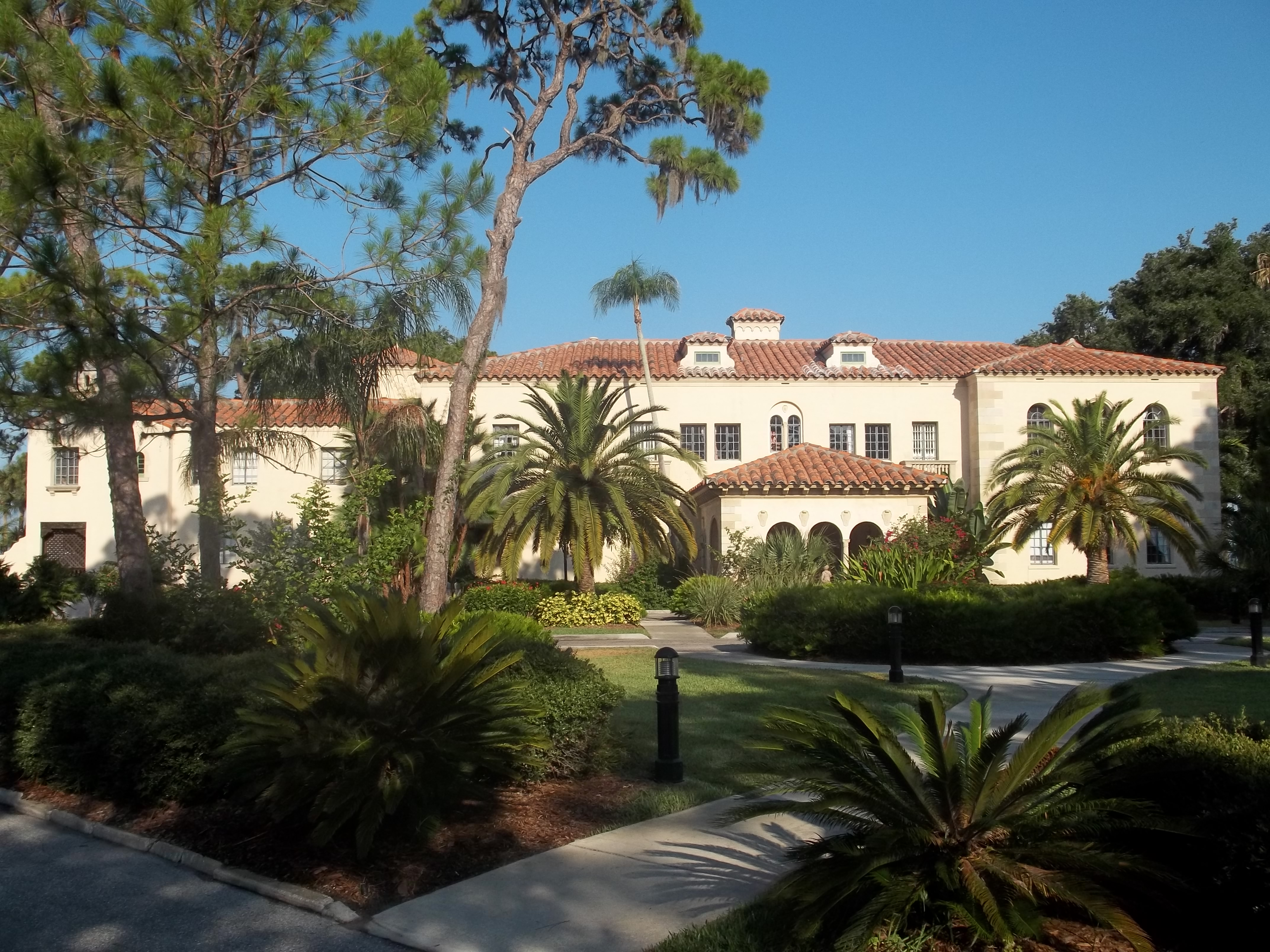
Seagate

Seagate, also known as the Bay Club, along Sarasota Bay in the southwest corner of Manatee County, Florida, was a Mediterranean Revival-style home designed for Crosley by New York City and Sarasota architect George Albree Freeman Jr., with Ivo A. de Minicis, a Tampa, Florida, architect, drafting the plans. Sarasota contractor Paul W. Bergman built the 11,000-square-foot (1,000 m^{2}) winter retreat in 1929–30 on a 63-acre (25-hectare) parcel of land. The two-and-a-half-story house include ten bedrooms and ten bathrooms, as well as auxiliary garages and living quarters for staff. The house contains and is reportedly the first residence built in Florida using steel-frame construction to provide protection against fires and hurricanes. After Crosley's wife, Gwendolyn, died of tuberculosis at the retreat in 1939, he rarely used the house. During World War II, Crosley allowed the U.S. Army Air Corps to use the retreat for its airmen training at the nearby Sarasota Army Air Base. Crosley sold his estate property in 1947 to the D and D Corporation.

Mabel and Freeman Horton purchased the property in 1948 and owned Seagate for nearly forty years. The house and 45 acres (18 hectares) was added to the National Register of Historic Places on January 21, 1983, by a subsequent owner who intended to build an exclusive condominium project on the site using the historic house as a clubhouse, but the project failed when the economy faltered shortly thereafter. Kafi Benz, the Friends of Seagate Inc., a nonprofit corporation, and local residents saved Seagate from commercial development, and initiated a campaign for its preservation and public acquisition. In 1991 the state of Florida purchased the property and 16.5 acres (6.7 hectares) of the bay-front estate that included the structures that Crosley had built in 1929–30. A larger portion of the original property was developed into a satellite campus for the University of South Florida. The University of South Florida Sarasota-Manatee campus opened its new facilities in August 2006. The present-day mansion, called the Powel Crosley Estate, is used as a meeting, conference, and event venue.

=== Vacation homes ===
Crosley, an avid sportsman, also owned several sports, hunting, and fishing camps, including an island retreat called Nikassi on McGregor Bay, Lake Huron, Canada; Bull Island, South Carolina; Pimlico Plantation, along the Cooper River north of Charleston, South Carolina; Sleepy Hollow Farm, a retreat in Jennings County, Indiana and a house at Cat Cays, Bahamas.

== Early career ==
Crosley began work selling bonds for an investment banker; however, at the age of twenty-one he decided to pursue a career in automobile manufacturing. The mass-production techniques employed by Henry Ford also caught his attention and would be implemented by his brother, Lewis, when the two began manufacturing radios in 1921.

In 1907 Crosley formed a company to build the Marathon Six, a six-cylinder model priced at $1,700, which was at the low end of the luxury car market. With $10,000 in capital that he raised from investors, Crosley established Marathon Six Automotive inexpensive automobile, in Connersville, Indiana, and built a prototype of his car, but a nationwide financial panic caused investment capital to dwindle and he failed to fund its production.

Still determined to establish himself as an automaker, Crosley moved to Indianapolis, Indiana, where he worked for Carl G. Fisher as a shop hand at the Fisher Automobile Company. Crosley stayed for about a year, but left after he broke his arm starting a car at the auto dealership. After recovering from his injury at home in College Hill, Crosley returned to Indianapolis in 1909 to briefly work for several auto manufacturers, including jobs as an assistant sales manager for the Parry Auto Company and a salesman for the National Motor Vehicle Company. He also volunteered to help promote National's auto racing team. His next job was selling advertising for Motor Vehicle, an automotive trade journal, but left in 1910 to move to Muncie, Indiana, where he worked in sales for the Inter-State Automobile Company and promoted its racing team.

== Early automobile and parts manufacturer ==
After returning to Cincinnati, in 1911, Crosley sold and wrote advertisements for local businesses, but continued to pursue his interests in the automobile industry. He failed in early efforts to manufacture cars for the Hermes Automobile Company and cyclecars for the De Cross Cyclecar Company and the L. Porter Smith and Brothers Company before finding financial success in manufacturing and distributing automobile accessories.

In 1916, he co-founded the American Automobile Accessory Company with Ira J. Cooper. The company's bestseller was a tire liner of Crosley's invention. Another popular product was a flag holder that held five American flags and clamped to auto radiator caps. By 1919 Crosley had sales of more than $1 million in parts. He also diversified into other consumer products such as phonograph cabinets, radios, and home appliances. Crosley's greatest strength was his ability to invent new products, while his brother, Lewis M. Crosley, excelled in business. Lewis also became head of Crosley's manufacturing operations.

In 1920, Crosley first selected independent local dealers as the best way to take his products to market. He insisted that all sellers of his products must give the consumer the best in parts, service, and satisfaction. Always sensitive to consumers, his products were often less expensive than other name brands, but were guaranteed. Crosley's "money back guarantee" set a precedent for some of today's most outstanding sales policies.

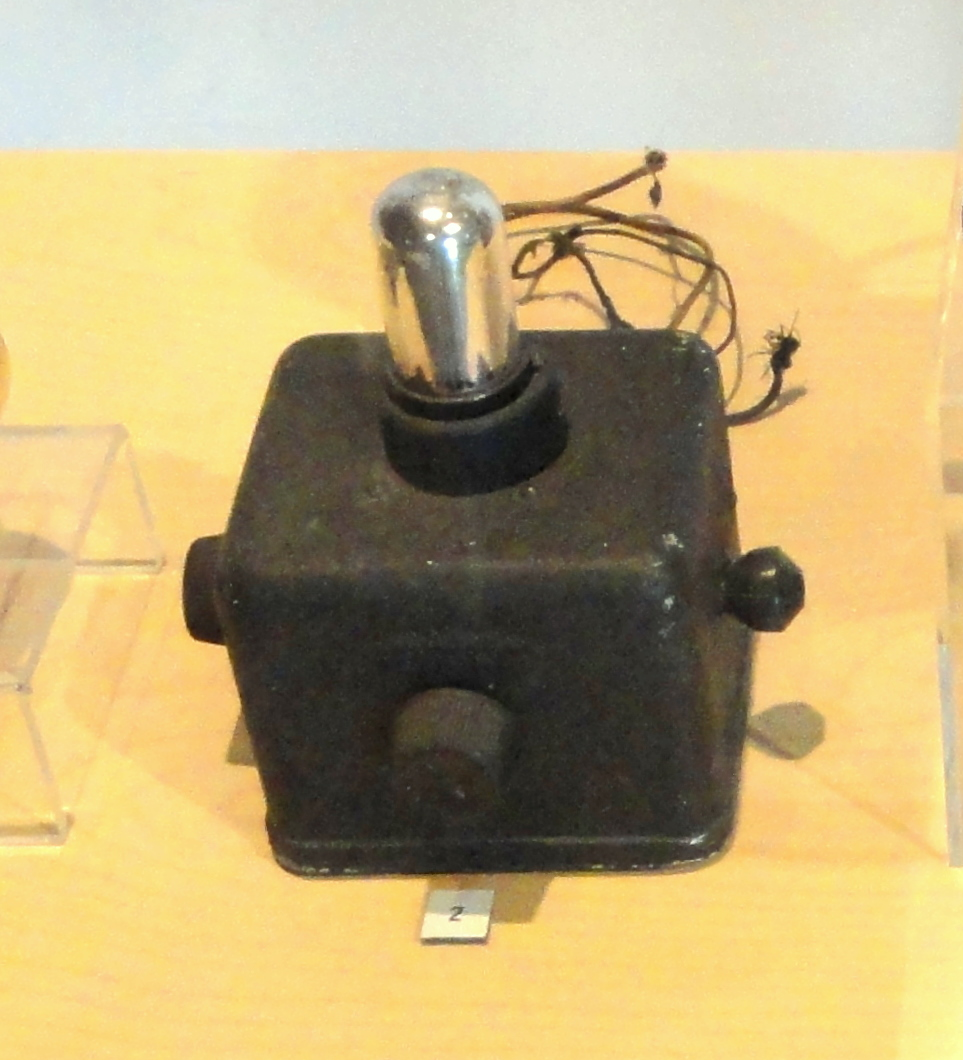
The Crosley Pup 1-tube radio

== Radio manufacturer ==
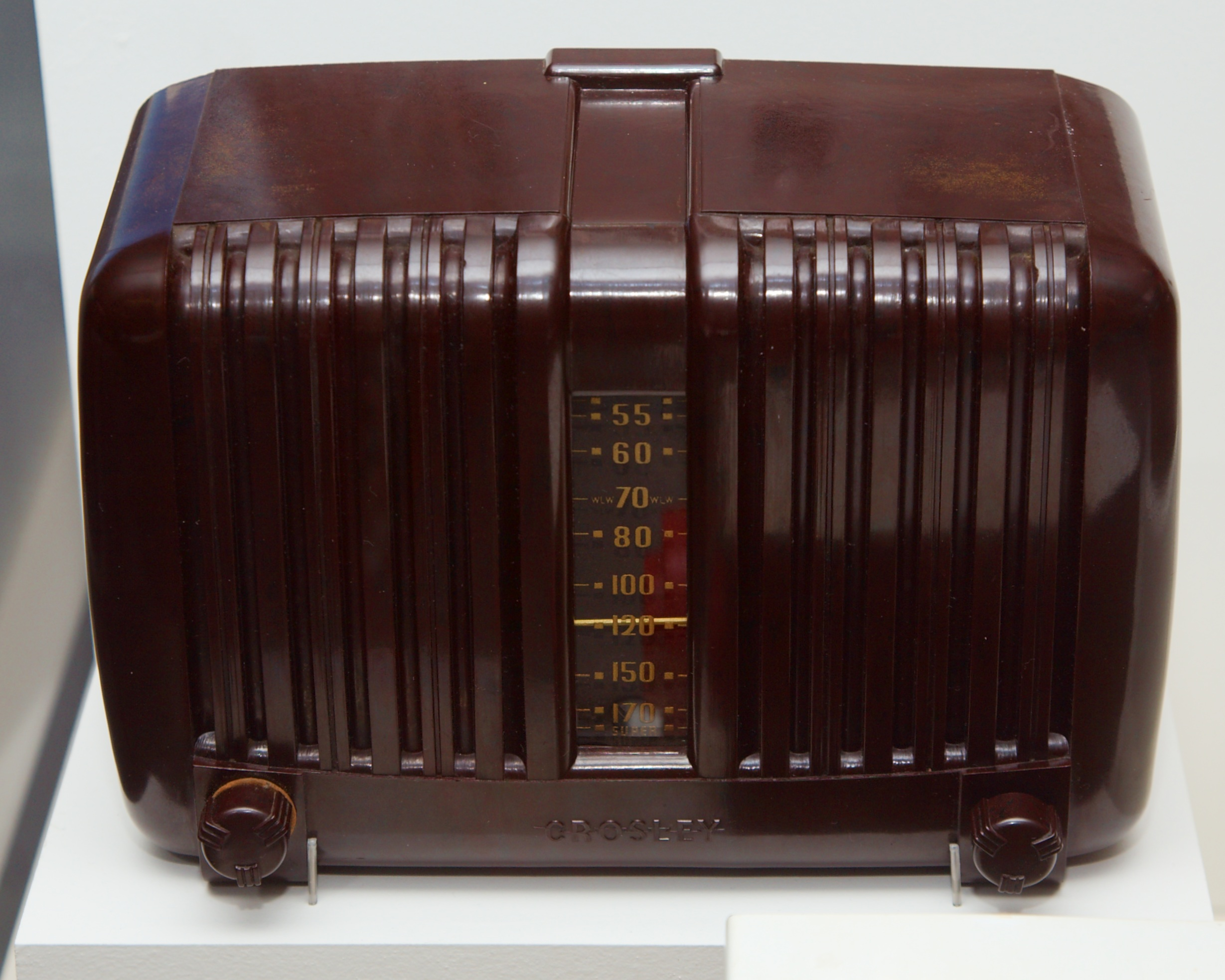
A Crosley radio from the late 1930s. Note that the "70" setting is marked "WLW," for the station owned by Crosley

In 1921, Crosley's young son asked for a radio receiver, a new item at that time, but Crosley was surprised that high-end receivers cost more than $100 at a local store, the Precision Equipment Company. With the help of a booklet called "The ABC of Radio", he and his son decided to assemble the components and build their own crystal radio set. Crosley immediately recognized the appeal of an inexpensive radio and hired two University of Cincinnati students to help design a low-cost set that could be mass-produced. Crosley named the radio the "Harko" and introduced it to the market in 1921. The inexpensive radio set sold for $7, making it affordable to the masses. Soon, Crosley arranged for the purchase of Precision Equipment, which was renamed the Crosley Radio Corporation, which manufactured radio components for the rapidly growing industry and made its own line of radios.

By 1924, Crosley had moved his company to a larger plant and later made subsequent expansions. The Crosley Radio Corporation became the largest radio manufacturer in the world in 1925; its slogan, "You’re There With A Crosley," was used in all its advertising.

In 1925, Crosley introduced another low-cost radio set. The small, one-tube, regenerative radio was called the "Crosley Pup" and sold for $8.75. While Victor had the rights to "His Master's Voice", its famous trademark showing Nipper listening to a phonograph, Crosley adopted a mascot in the form of a dog with headphones listening to a Crosley Pup radio.

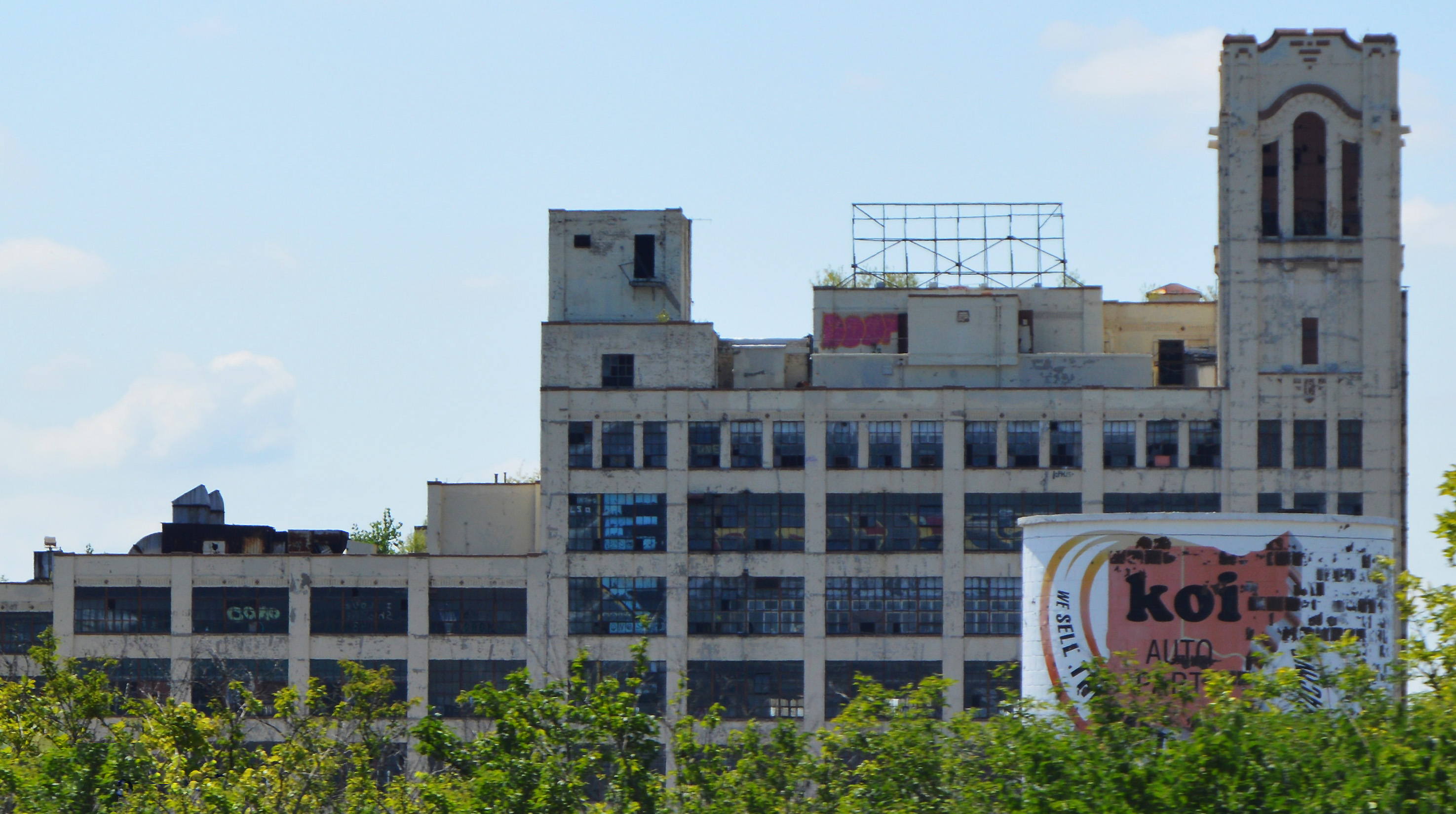
The Crosley Building, Cincinnati

In 1928, Crosley's firm arranged for the construction of the Crosley Building at Camp Washington, a Cincinnati neighborhood, and used the facility for radio manufacturing, radio broadcasting, and for manufacturing other devices.

In 1930, Crosley was marketing the "Roamio", with "screen grid neutrodyne power speaker" for automotive use. Priced at $75, before accessories and installation, it was claimed to be able to receive thirty stations with no signal strength change.

== Radio and television broadcasting ==
Once Crosley established himself as a radio manufacturer, he decided to expand into broadcasting as a way to encourage consumers to purchase more receivers. In 1921, soon after he built his first radios, Crosley began experimental broadcasts from his home with a 20-watt transmitter using the amateur call sign 8CR. On March 2, 1922, the Crosley Manufacturing Corporation received a broadcasting license to operate as WLW at 50 watts. Dorman D. Israel, a young radio engineer from the University of Cincinnati, designed and built the station's first two radio transmitters (at 100 and 1,000 watts). After acquiring the Precision Equipment Company, its broadcasting station, WMH, was shut down, while the Crosley station, WLW, was rapidly expanded. Crosley Corporation claimed that, in 1928, WLW became the first 50-kilowatt commercial station in the United States with a regular broadcasting schedule. In 1934, Crosley put a 500-kilowatt transmitter on the air, making WLW the station with the world's most powerful radio transmitter for the next five years. (On occasion, the station's power was boosted as high as 700,000 watts.)

Throughout the 1930s, Cincinnati's WLW was considered "the Nation's Station," producing many hours of network programming each week. Among the entertainers who performed live from WLW's studios were Red Skelton, Doris Day, Jane Froman, Fats Waller, Rosemary Clooney, and the Mills Brothers. In 1939, the Federal Communications Commission (FCC) ruled that WLW had to reduce its power to 50 kilowatts, partly because it interfered with the broadcasts of other stations, but largely due to its smaller competitors, who complained about the station's technical and commercial advantages with its 500-kilowatt broadcasts.

During World War II, WLW resumed its powerful, 500-kilowatt transmissions in cooperation with the U.S. government. WLW's engineers also built high-power shortwave transmitters on a site about 25 miles (40 km) north of Cincinnati. Crosley Broadcasting, under contract to the U.S. government, began operating the Bethany Relay Station, which was dedicated on September 23, 1944, to broadcast "Voice of America" programming. The relay station's broadcasts continued until 1994.

Crosley's broadcasting company eventually expanded into additional markets. The company was experimenting with television broadcasting as early as 1929, when it received an experimental television license (W8XCT) from the Federal Radio Commission (FRC), which later became the FCC. On 4 June, 1946 W8XCT transmitted Cincinnati's first television broadcast, a test pattern. Two days later, to show off the potential for advertising revenue, a box of Borax was broadcast. W8XCT started broadcasting a one-hour regular weekly program in August 1947, which rose to 20 hours per week by the end of the year. In January 1948 a commercial license was granted and W8XCT became WLWT in February of the same year. WLWT was made the first (one source says second) NBC affiliate in the country in April 1948.

== Appliance and consumer products manufacturer ==
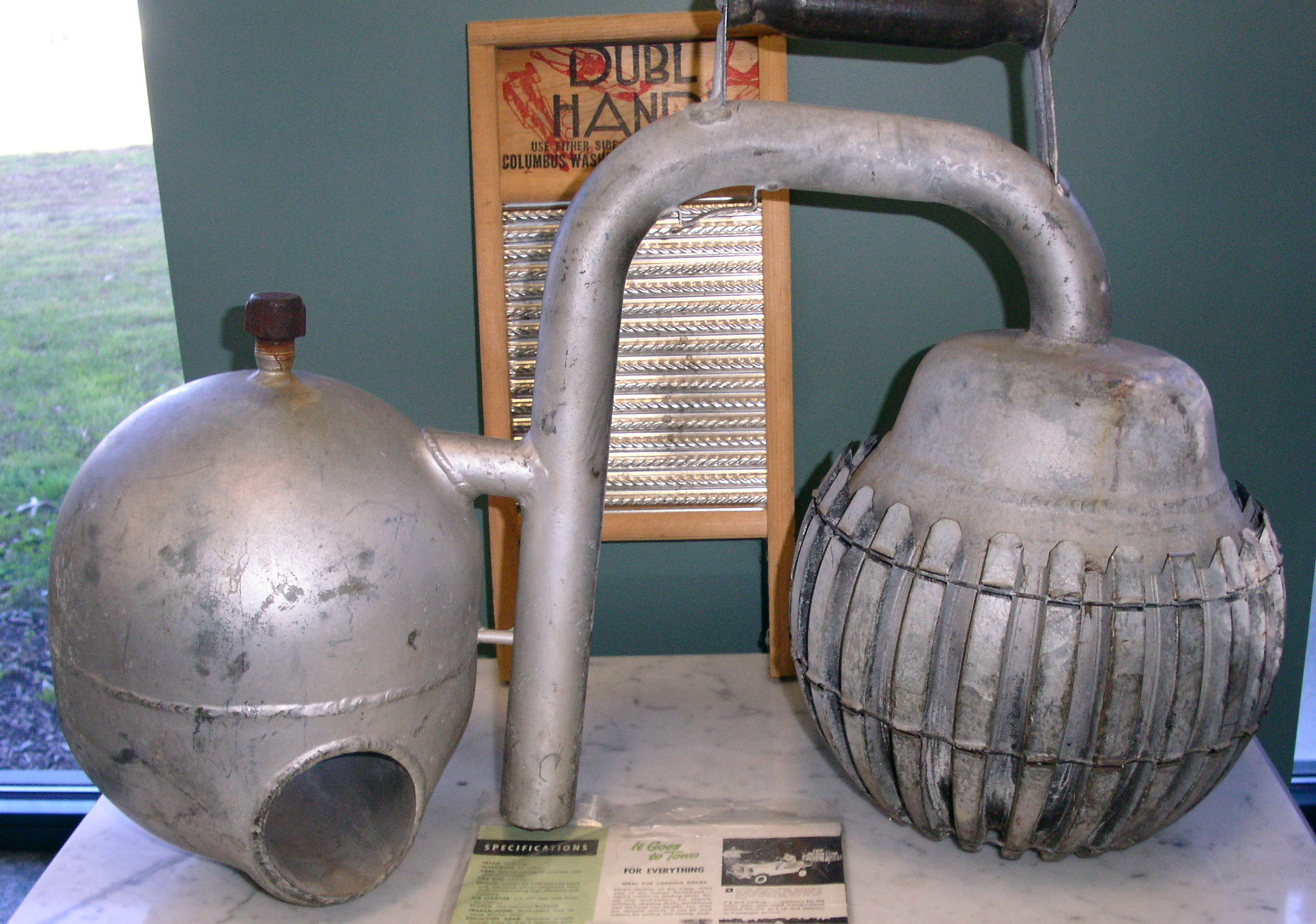
Icyball refrigerator

In the 1930s, Crosley added refrigerators and other household appliances and consumer goods to his company's product line.

Crosley's "Icyball" was an early non-electrical refrigeration device, designed by Crosley and David Forbes Keith. The unit used an evaporative cycle to create cold, and had no moving parts. The "hot ball", containing ammonia and water, was "charged" by heating it with a small kerosene heater or stove. The other side of the unit, the "cold ball", condensed the evaporated ammonia. Once the system was going then the cold side was placed in a specially designed insulated chest to keep food cold. Sales were so good (with claims of 22,000 in the first year of production) that a second plant was set up outside of Toronto where it was sold by the Canadian De Forest-Crosley Company. The Icyball was eventually sold in Europe and other parts of the world as well. By 1935, however, sales had dropped off. This was due partly because of the electrification of rural areas and also due to the Icyball not needing to be replaced, so it was a one time purchase for most homes.

In 1932 Crosley had the idea of putting shelves in the doors of refrigerators. He patented the "Shelvador" refrigerator and launched the new appliance in 1933. At that time it was the only model with shelves in the door. In addition to refrigerators, Crosley's company sold other consumer products that included the "XERVAC," a device purported to "revitalize inactive hair cells" and "stimulate hair growth". Crosley also introduced the "Autogym," a motor-driven weight-loss device with a vibrating belt, and the "Go-Bi-Bi," a "rideable baby walker," among other products.

== Baseball team owner and sportsman ==
In February 1934, Crosley purchased the Cincinnati Reds professional baseball team from Sidney Weil, who had lost much of his wealth after the Wall Street Crash of 1929. Crosley kept the team from going bankrupt and leaving Cincinnati. He was also owner of the Reds when the team won two National League titles (in 1939 and 1940) and the World Series in 1940.

Crosley was also a pioneer in broadcasting baseball games on the radio. On May 24, 1935, the first nighttime game in Major League baseball history was held at Cincinnati's Crosley Field, which was renamed in Crosley's honor after he acquired the team (before this, the ballpark was named Redland Field), between the Cincinnati Reds and Philadelphia Phillies under newly installed electric lighting. With attendance at its evening games more than four times greater that its daytime events, the team's financial position was greatly improved. Crosley also approved baseball's first regularly scheduled play-by-play broadcasts of all scheduled games on his local station, WSAI, whose call letters stood for "sports and information," and later on WLW. The coverage increased attendance so much that within five years all 16 major league teams had radio broadcasts of every scheduled game.

On a personal level, Crosley was an avid sportsman. Although he never had a pilot's license, Crosley owned several seaplanes, such as the Douglas Dolphin, and airplanes, including building five Crosley "Moonbeam" airplanes. In addition, Crosley claimed that at one time he was slotted to be a driver in the Indianapolis 500, but that claim was not entirely accurate. He was entered but broke his arm working for Carl Fisher (see above). Crosley was also the owner of luxury yachts with powerful engines, and an active fisherman who participated in celebrated tournaments in Sarasota, Florida. He served as president of the Sarasota area's Anglers Club and was a founder of the American Wildlife Institute. Crosley owned several sports, hunting, and fishing camps: Nikassi, an island retreat in Ontario, Canada; Bull Island off the coast of South Carolina; a hunting retreat he called Sleepy Hollow Farm in Jennings County, Indiana, and a Caribbean vacation home at Cat Cays, Bahamas.

== Aircraft manufacturer ==
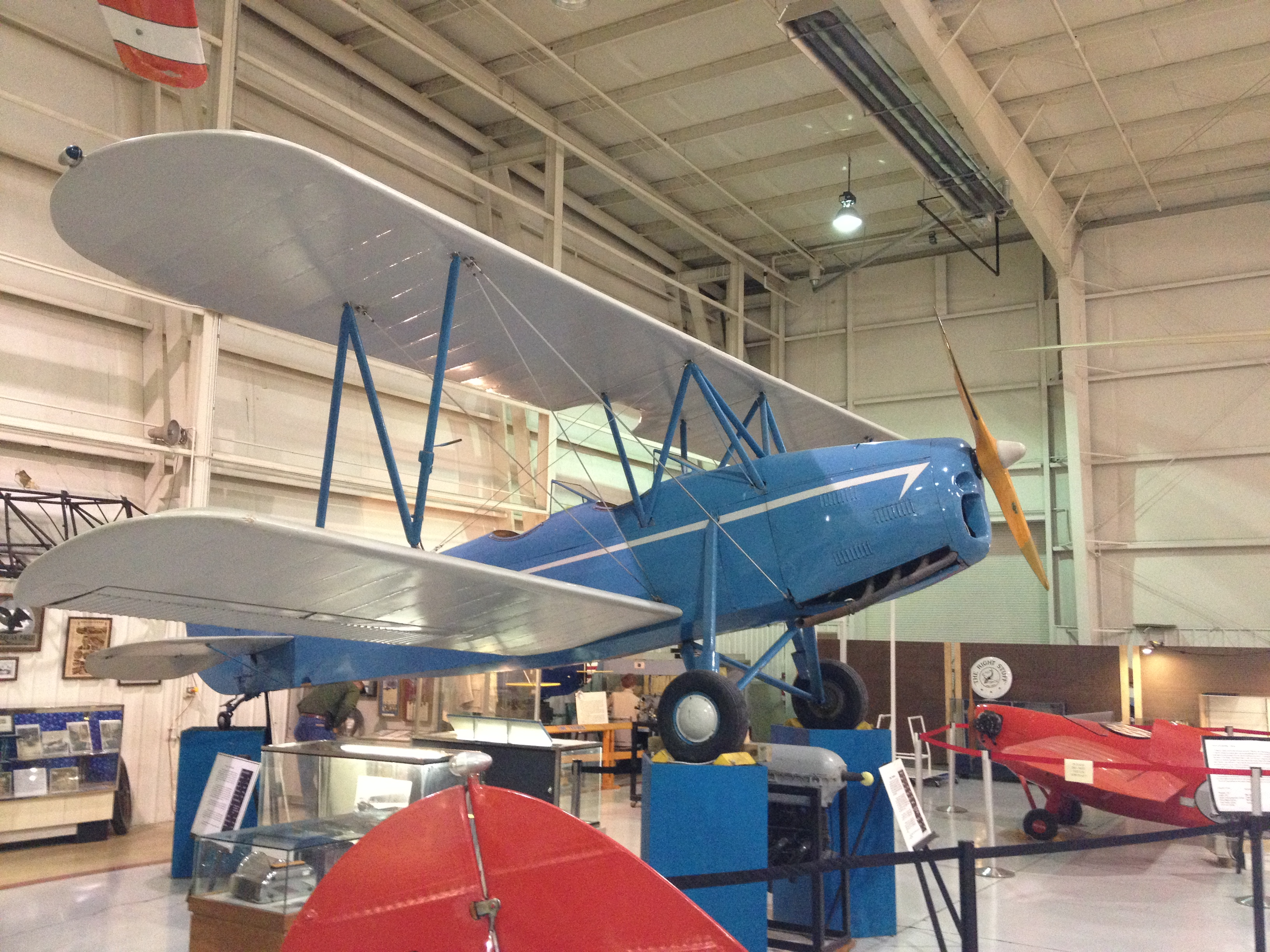
1929 Crosley "Moonbeam" at the Aviation Museum of Kentucky

Powel briefly turned his attention to aviation in 1928, when he formed Crosley Aircraft Corporation and began manufacturing Crosley “Moonbeam” planes, designed by Harold D. Hoekstra. Five models were produced. The biplanes were the first to use metal torque tubes rather than control cables or ropes. The project was halted by the Great Depression. Only one plane remains today, NX-147N, housed at the Aviation Museum of Kentucky in Lexington Kentucky.

Crosley Aircraft Corporation Planes:

Registration	Type	First Flight
X-642E	Parasol	29 April, 1929
X-10M	Cabin	9 August, 1929
X-146N	Biplane	1929
X-147N	Biplane	8 December, 1929
X-9679	High Wing	25 May, 1930

Crosley Flea

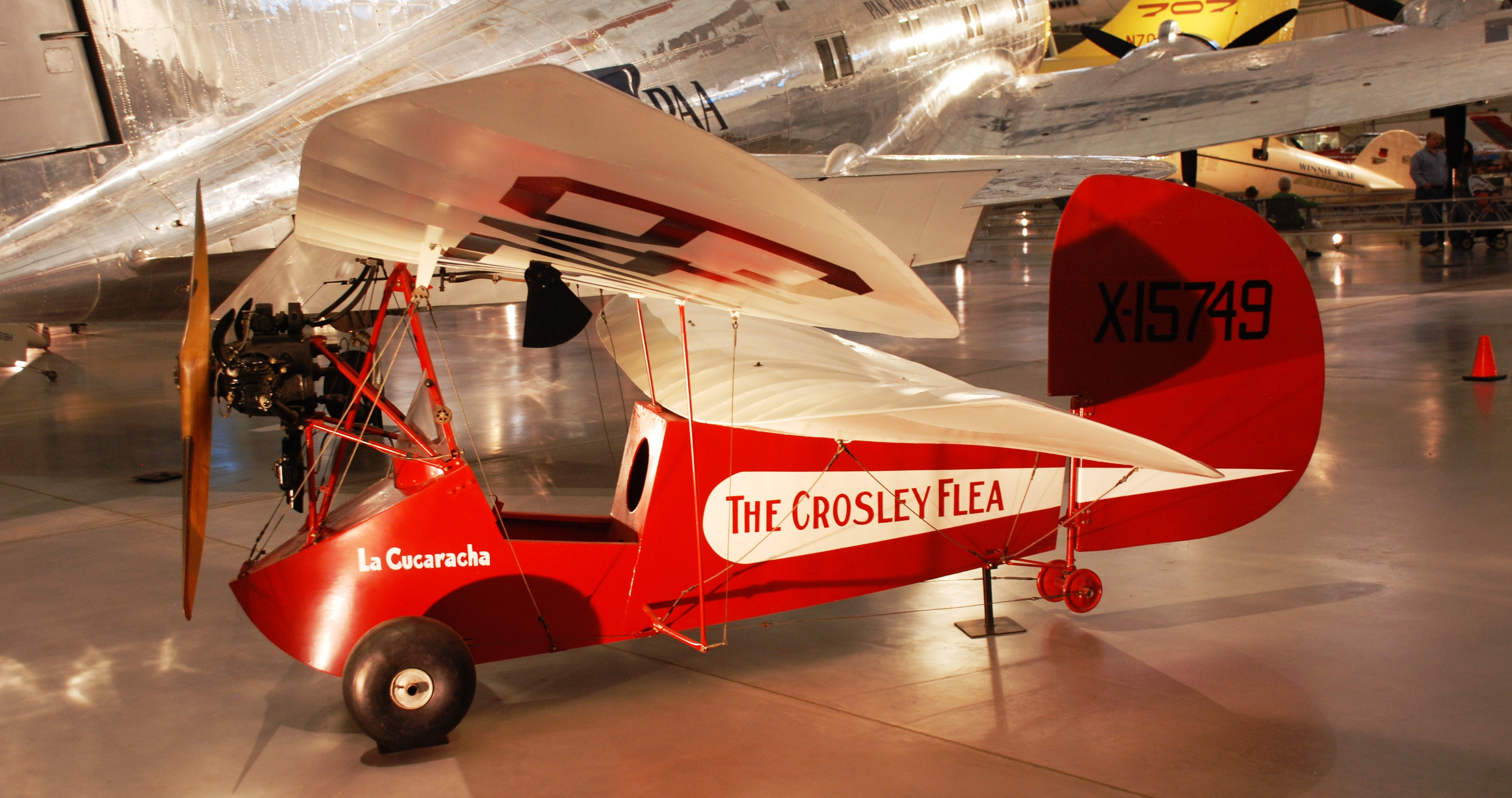
Mignet Crosley "Flea," 1935

In 1933 Frenchman Henri Mignet designed the Mignet HM.14 "Pou du Ciel" ("Flying Flea") as a simple aircraft that could be built and flown by amateurs. Employee Edward Nirmaier and two other men built and flew an HM.14, the Mignet-Crosley "Pou du Ciel", in November 1935 for Crosley. Although it was flown several times, it was permanently grounded after a crash at the Miami Air Races in December 1935. It was donated to the Smithsonian in 1960 by Patrick H. "Pat" Packard, and in 1987 was restored by Patti Koppa and Patrick Packard. The original ABC Scorpion engine wasn't available so a wooden replica was used instead.

== Automaker ==
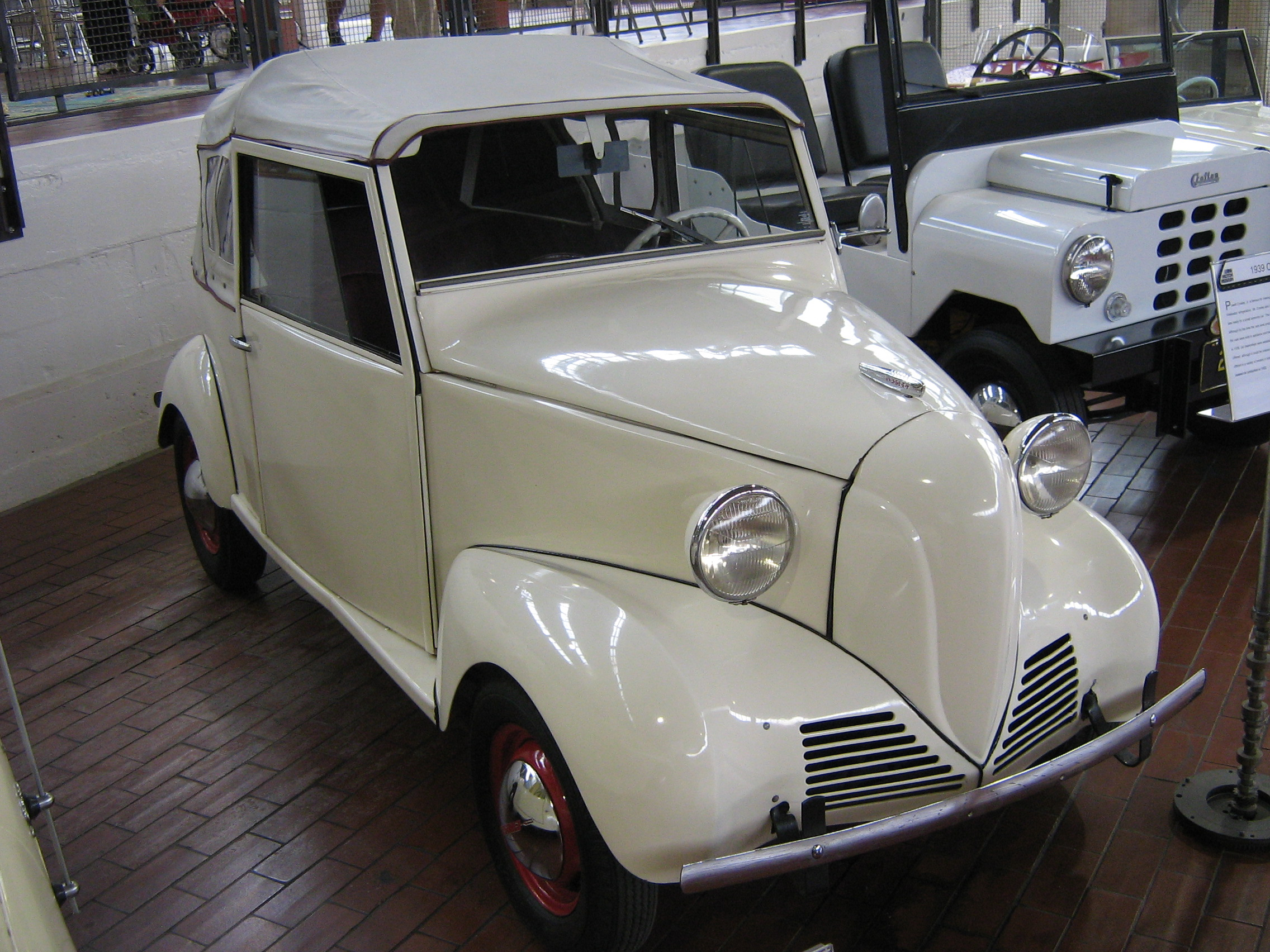
1939 Crosley "Transferable" model

Of all Crosley's dreams, success at building an affordable automobile for Americans was possibly the only major one eventually to elude him. In the years leading up to World War II, Crosley developed new products that included reviving one of his earliest endeavors at automobile design and manufacturing. In 1939, when Crosley introduced the low-priced Crosley automobiles, he broke with tradition and sold his cars through independent appliance, hardware, and department stores instead of automobile dealerships.

The first Crosley Motors, Inc. automobile made its debut at the Indianapolis Motor Speedway on April 28, 1939, to mixed reviews. The compact car had an 80-inch (200 cm) wheelbase and a 38.87-cubic-inch (637.0 cm^{3}), two-cylinder, air cooled Waukesha engine. Crosley estimated that his cloth-top car, which weighed less than 1,000 pounds (450 kg), could get fifty miles per gallon at speeds of up to fifty miles per hour. The sedan model sold for $325, while the coupe sold for $350. Panel truck and pickup truck models were added to the product line in 1940. During the pre-war period, the company had manufacturing plants in Camp Washington, Ohio; Richmond, Indiana; and Marion, Indiana. When the onset of war ended all automobile production in the United States in 1942, Crosley had produced 5,757 cars.

After World War II ended, Crosley resumed building its small cars for civilian use. His company's first post-war automobile rolled off the assembly line on May 9, 1946. The new Crosley "CC" model automobile continued the company's pre-war tradition of offering small, lightweight, and low-priced cars. It sold for $850 and got thirty to fifty miles per U.S. gallon. In 1949 Crosley became the first American carmaker to put disc brakes on all of its models.

Unfortunately for Crosley, fuel economy ceased to be an inducement after gas rationing ended, and American consumers also began to prefer bigger cars. Crosley's best year was 1948, when it sold 24,871 cars, but sales began to fall in 1949. Adding the Crosley "Hotshot" sports model and an all-purpose vehicle called the "Farm-O-Road" model in 1950 did not stop the decline. Only 1,522 Crosley vehicles were sold in 1952. Crosley sold about 84,000 cars before closing down the operation on July 3, 1952. The Crosley plant in Marion, Indiana, was sold to the General Tire and Rubber Company.

== War-production contractor ==
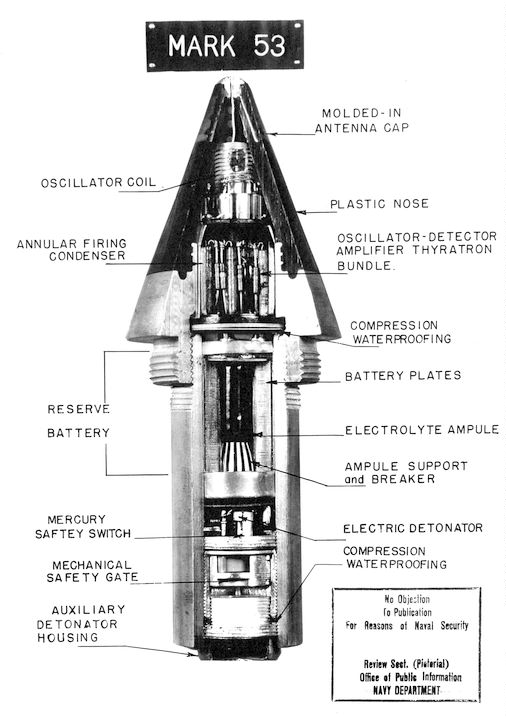
A Crosley-manufactured, Mark 53 proximity (VT) fuze for the U.S. Navy

Crosley's company was involved in war production planning before December 1941, and like the rest of American industry, it focused on manufacturing war-related products during World War II. The company made a variety of products, including proximity fuzes, experimental military vehicles, radio transceivers, and gun turrets, among other items.

=== Proximity fuzes ===
The most significant Crosley's wartime production was the proximity fuze, which was manufactured by several companies for the military. Crosley's facilities produced more fuzes than any other manufacturer and made several production design innovations. The fuze is widely considered the third most important product development of the war years, ranking behind the atomic bomb and radar.

Ironically, Crosley himself did not have U.S. government security clearance and was not involved with the project. Without government security clearance, Crosley was prohibited from entering the area of his plant that manufactured the fuzes and did not know what top-secret products it produced until the war's end. Production was directed and supervised by Lewis M. Clement, the Crosley company's vice-president of engineering.

James V. Forrestal, U.S. Secretary of the Navy said: "The proximity fuze has helped blaze the trail to Japan. Without the protection this ingenious device has given the surface ships of the Fleet, our westward push could not have been so swift and the cost in men and ships would have been immeasurably greater." George S. Patton, Commanding General of the Third Army, remarked: "The funny fuze won the Battle of the Bulge for us. I think that when all armies get this shell we will have to devise some new method of warfare."

=== Radio transceivers, gun turrets, and other products ===
Also of significance were the many radio transceivers that Crosley's company manufactured during the war, including 150,000 BC-654s, a receiver and transmitter that was the main component of the SCR-284 radio set. The Crosley Corporation also made components for Walkie-talkie transceivers and IFR radio guidance equipment, among other products. In addition, Crosley's also manufactured field kitchens, air supply units for Sperry S-1 bombsights (used in B-24 bombers), air conditioning units, Martin PBM Mariner bow-gun turrets, and quarter-ton trailers. Gun turrets for PT boats and B-24 and B-29 bombers were the company's largest military contract.

=== Experimental military vehicles ===
During the war, Crosley's auto manufacturing division, CRAD (for Crosley Radio Auto Division), in Richmond, Indiana, produced experimental motorcycles, tricycles, four-wheel-drive vehicles, and continuous track vehicles, including some amphibious models. All of these military prototypes were powered by the two-cylinder boxer engine that had powered the original Crosley automobile.

One vehicle prototype was the 1942/1943 Crosley CT-3 "Pup," a lightweight, single-passenger, four-wheel-drive vehicle that was transportable and air-droppable from a C-47 Skytrain. Six of the 1,125-pound (510 kg) Pups were deployed overseas after undergoing tests at Fort Benning, Georgia, but the Pup project was discontinued due to several weak components. Seven of the thirty-seven Pups that were built are known to survive.

== Later years ==
Although Crosley retained ownership of the Cincinnati Reds baseball team and Crosley Motors, he sold his other business interests, including WLW radio and the Crosley Corporation, to the Aviation Corporation (Avco) in 1945. Crosley remained on the Avco board for several years afterward. Avco put Ohio's second television station, WLWT-TV, on the air in 1948, the same year it began manufacturing television sets. Avco manufactured some of the first portable television sets under the Crosley brand name. Crosley ceased to exist as a brand in 1956, when Avco closed the unprofitable product line; however, the Crosley name was so well established that Avco's broadcasting division, owner of WLWT-TV, retained the Crosley name until 1968, seven years after Crosley's death.

Crosley sold Pimlico Plantation, now demolished, in 1942, and Seagate, his winter retreat in Florida in 1947. In 1954 Crosley sold his vacation home at Cat Keys, Bahamas. In 1956 he sold Sleepy Hollow Farm in Jennings County, Indiana, to the state of Indiana for use as a wildlife preserve. Bull Island, South Carolina, became part of a national wildlife refuge. It is not known when Crosley sold his vacation retreat in Ontario, Canada.

== Death and legacy ==
Crosley died on March 28, 1961, of a heart attack at the age of 74. He is buried at Spring Grove Cemetery in Cincinnati.

Crosley liked to label himself "the man with 50 jobs in 50 years," a catchy sobriquet that was far from true, although he did have more than a dozen jobs before he got into automobile accessories. Crosley helped quite a few inventors up the ladder of success by buying the rights to their inventions and sharing in the profits. His work provided employment and products for millions of people.

A few of Crosley's company's more noteworthy accomplishments:

- manufactured the first post-WWII sports car, the Hotshot
- became the second company to install car radios in its models
- the first to introduce push-button car radios
- introduced soap operas to radio broadcasts
- introduced the first refrigerator with shelves in the door (Shelvador)
- launched the world's most powerful commercial radio station (WLW, at 500 kW)
- installed the first lights on a major league baseball field
- introduced one of the first inexpensive facsimile news & newspaper broadcasts for home use with the Reado radio-FAX
- the first American carmaker to have disc brakes on all its models (in 1949)

Part of Crosley's Pinecroft estate, his former Cincinnati, Ohio, home, is the site of Mercy Hospitals West; however, the Franciscan Sisters of the Poor have used his mansion as a retreat since the early 1970s. Seagate, Crosley's former winter retreat on Sarasota Bay in Florida, is operated as an event rental facility. Pinecroft and Seagate have been restored and are listed in the National Register of Historic Places. Crosley's farm in Jennings County, Indiana, is the site of the present-day Crosley Fish and Wildlife Area; Bull Island, South Carolina, is part of the Cape Romain National Wildlife Refuge.

WLW radio continues to operate as an AM station. Crosley's manufacturing plants in Richmond and Marion, Indiana, are still standing, but they no longer produce automobiles. In 1973 a group of Avco executives purchased the Evendale, Ohio, operation of AVCO Electronics Division, a successor to one of Crosley's business ventures, and renamed it the Cincinnati Electronics Corporation. The company manufactured a broad range of sophisticated electronic equipment for communications and space, infrared and radar, and electronic warfare, among others. Since its creation in 1973, Cincinnati Electronics has been acquired by a handful of companies, including GEC Marconi (1981), BAE Systems (1999), CMC Electronics (2001), L-3 Communications (2004–2019), and L3Harris (2019-present).

The present-day Crosley Corporation is not connected to the original Crosley. An independent appliance distributor formed the current company after purchasing the rights to the name from Avco in 1976. Its appliances are manufactured mostly in North America by Electrolux and Whirlpool Corporation. Crosley-branded, top-loading washing machines are made by the Whirlpool at its plant in Clyde, Ohio. Modern Marketing Concepts, one of the leading U.S. manufacturers of vintage-styled turntables, radios, and other audio electronics, reintroduced Crosley brand name for its Crosley Radio. They first licensed the name from Brown-Rogers-Dixson, later buying it outright in 2000.

Crosley's automobiles and experimental military vehicles are in the collections of several museums. Crosleys are also sought-after vehicles by vintage auto collectors. The Crosley company's Bonzo promotional items and Crosley Pup radios have become valuable as collectibles. A papier mâché Crosley Bonzo is on display at the Smithsonian Institution in Washington, D.C.

The University of Cincinnati, where Crosley was a student, has named their building Crosley Tower after him.

== Honors and awards ==
- Inducted into the Automotive Hall of Fame in 2010.
- Inducted into the National Radio Hall of Fame in 2013.
- The street-level main entrance to Great American Ball Park in Cincinnati is named Crosley Terrace in his honor.
