= Ohisa Creek =

- Location of the mouth of Ohisa Creek Ohisa Creek (the United States)

Location
- Country: United States
- State: New York
- Region: Central New York
- County: Herkimer

Physical characteristics
- Source
  - coordinates: 42°56′03″N 74°53′18″W
- Mouth: Nowadaga Creek
  - location: Newville
  - coordinates: 42°58′18″N 74°50′26″W
  - elevation: 617 ft (188 m)
- Basin size: 18.6 sq mi (48 km^{2})

Basin features
- Progression: Ohisa Creek → Nowadaga Creek → Erie Canal → Mohawk River → Hudson River → Upper New York Bay

Ohisa Creek is a river in Herkimer County in the state of New York. The creek begins southeast of Paines Hollow and flows southeast then curves north and eventually converges with Nowadaga Creek in Newville.
