= Dwight James Baum =

American architect (1886–1939)

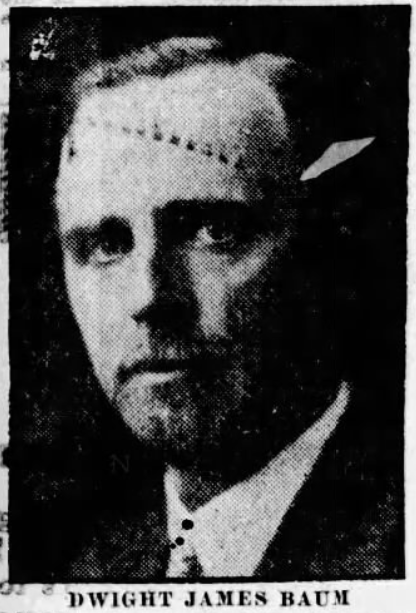
- Born: June 24, 1886; Newville, New York, U.S.
- Died: December 14, 1939 (aged 53); New York City, New York, U.S.
- Occupation: Architect

Dwight James Baum (June 24, 1886 – December 14, 1939) was an American architect most active in New York and in Sarasota, Florida. His work includes Cà d'Zan, the Sarasota Times Building (1925), Sarasota County Courthouse (1926), early residences in Temple Terrace, Florida, Sarasota County Courthouse (1927), Pinecroft, West Side YMCA on 63rd Street between Central Park and Columbus Avenue, Columbus Circle (Syracuse, NY) (1934) and Hendricks Memorial Chapel.

== Biography ==
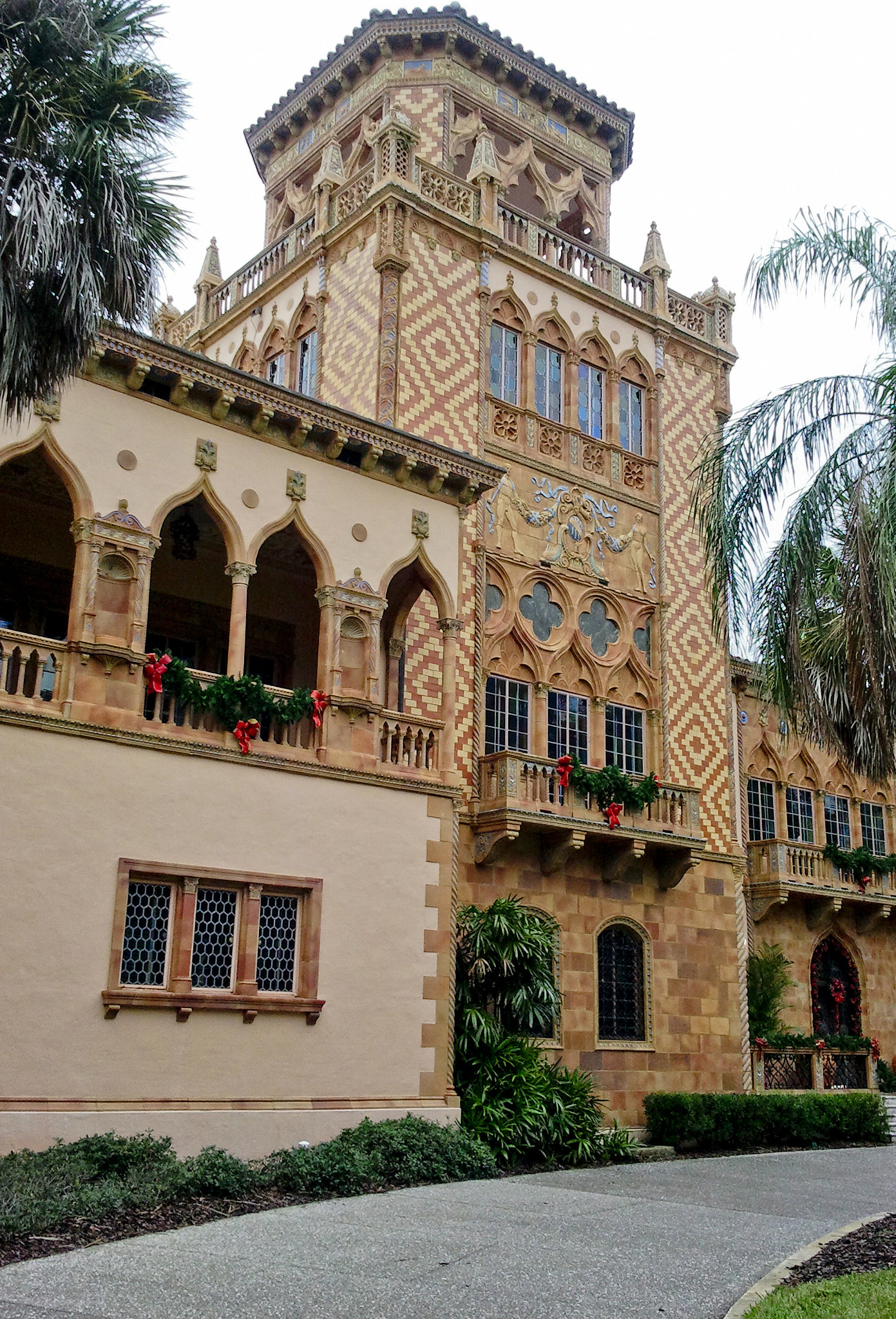
Ca' d'Zan (the Ringling Mansion)

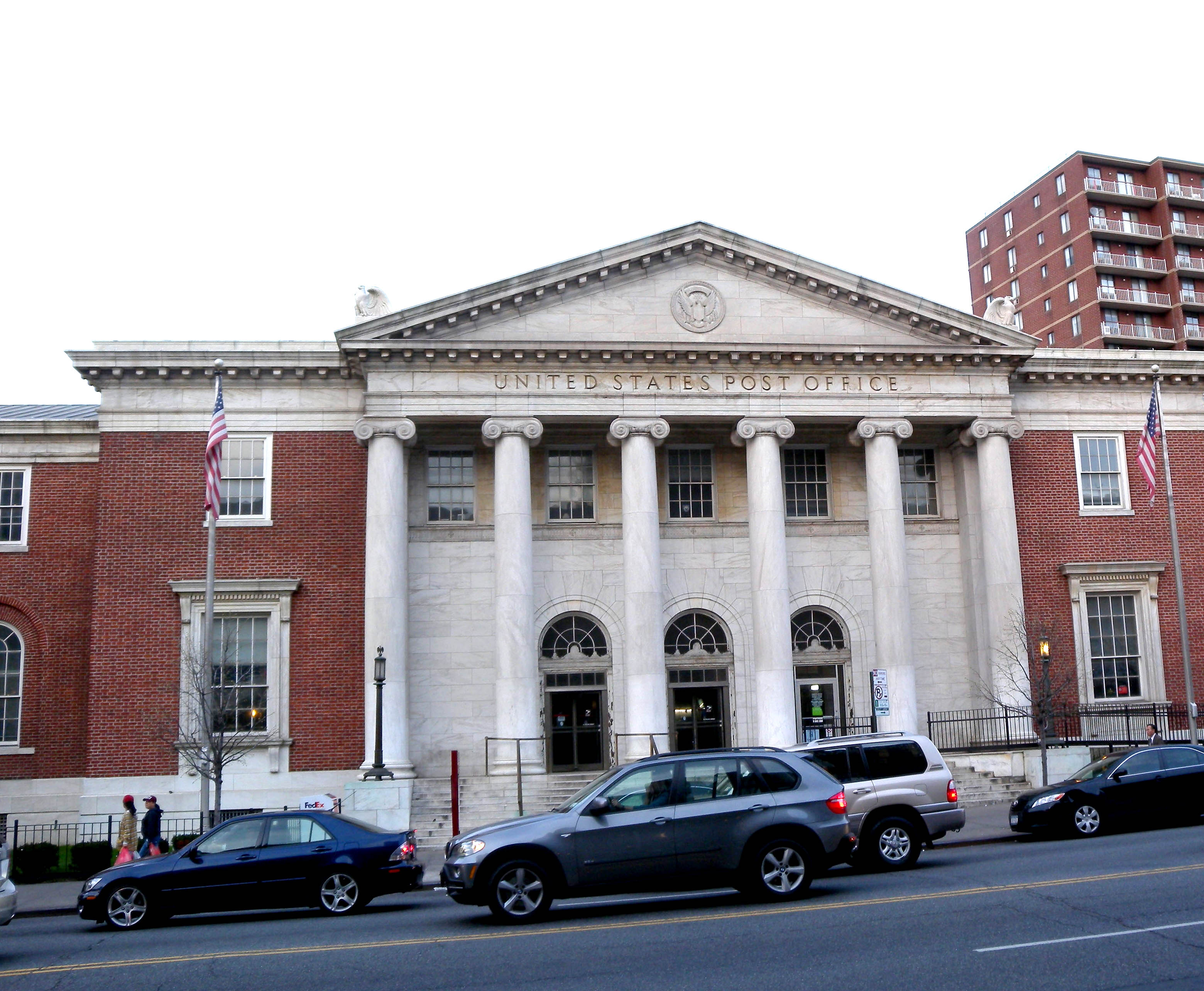
United States Post Office, Flushing, New York

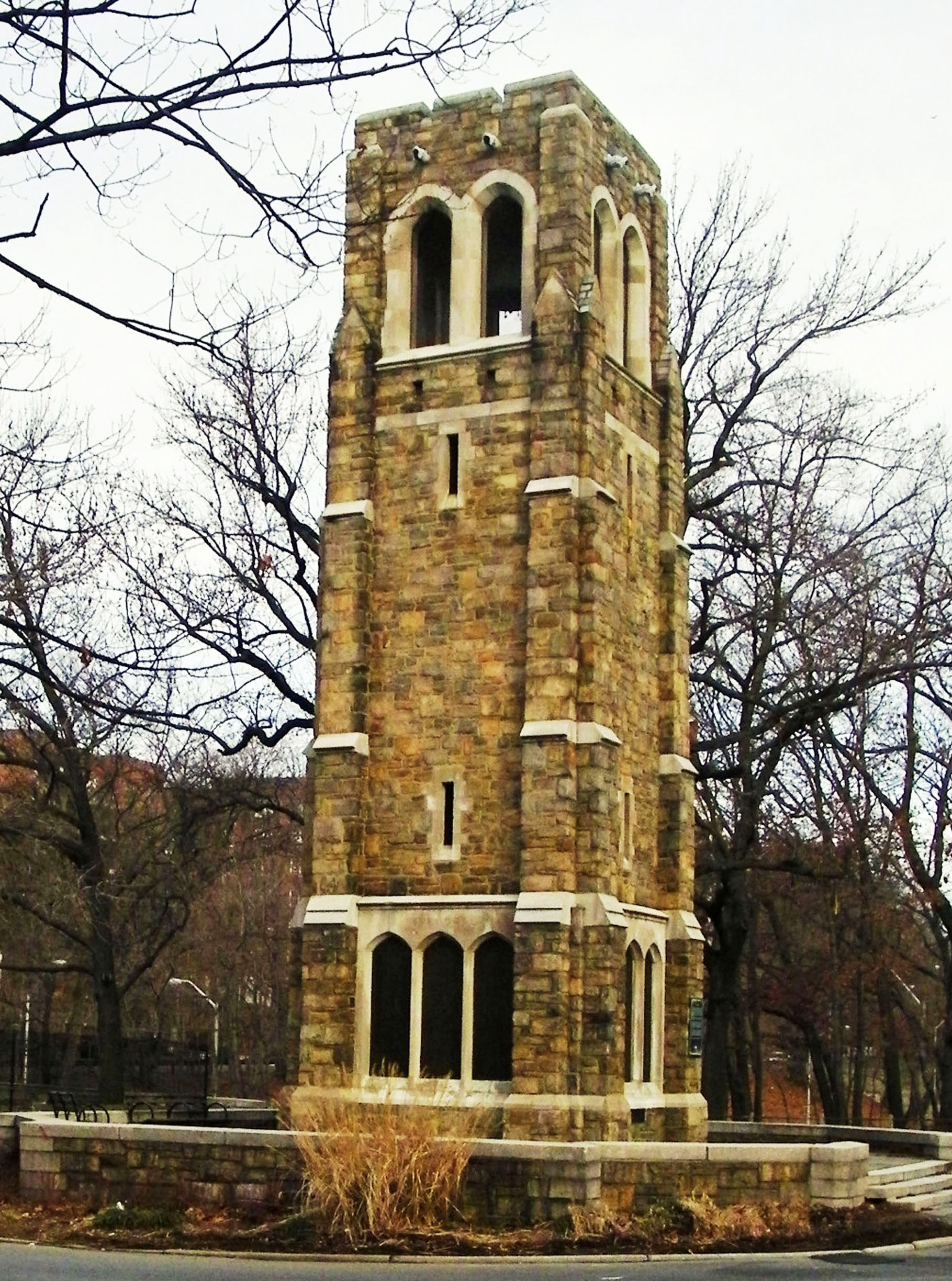
Riverdale Monument

Baum was born in Newville, New York (near Utica) and moved to Syracuse as a young man, eventually graduating from Syracuse University in 1909 with an architecture degree. He worked for nationally known firms Boring and Tilton and Stanford White before venturing out with his own residential design firm around 1912.

A 1922 visit to Florida led to an important commission from John Nicholas Ringling, the 56-room mansion and estate that the Ringlings dubbed Cà d'Zan, which is now on the grounds of the John and Mable Ringling Museum of Art. During the 1920s Florida land boom, Baum designed a half-dozen significant civic buildings and several houses in Sarasota, and at least one residence in Tampa, all in the Mediterranean Revival Style.

In 1926 Baum designed forty two Mediterranean Revival style houses of varying sizes in the City of Temple Terrace, Florida, this is thought to be the largest collection of his work in the Southeast. He also designed Sunset Hill for Mrs. Eugene D. Stocker at Warren, New York in 1923-1924. It was listed on the National Register of Historic Places in 2007. During the Depression, Baum became involved with historic preservation issues, becoming involved with Good Housekeeping Magazine as consulting architect, and as designer of their building exhibit at the 1933 Chicago World's Fair.

His later work includes buildings at his alma mater, Syracuse University (notably the focal point of the campus plan, the Hendricks Chapel, designed with John Russell Pope), and the pedestal for V. Renzo Baldi's statue of Columbus in the city's Columbus Circle.

Baum was distantly related to author and designer L. Frank Baum.

== Work ==
Some of his works are listed on the National Register of Historic Places. His work was also part of the architecture event in the art competition at the 1936 Summer Olympics.

Baum's work includes:

- Sarasota Times Building, 1925; NRHP-listed
- El Vernona Apartments-Broadway Apartments, 1926; NRHP-listed
- Sarasota County Courthouse, 1926; NRHP-listed
- Early residences in Temple Terrace, Florida, circa 1926
- Cà d'Zan, now the John and Mable Ringling Museum of Art, Sarasota, 1927
- Sarasota County Courthouse, 1927, NRHP-listed
- Residence of Arch B. Johnston, son of Archibald Johnston (first mayor of consolidated city of Bethlehem), Bethlehem Township, Pennsylvania, 1927
- The Farkas Residence, 3547 St. Gaudens Rd, Miami, FL

Year Built: 1924 https://www.historicpreservationmiami.com/FarkasResidence.html

- Memorial Hospital, Syracuse, with John Russell Pope, 1927
- Pinecroft, the Crosley Powel, Jr. Estate, Cincinnati, Ohio, 1928–1937
- West Side YMCA, on 63rd Street between Central Park and Columbus Avenue, New York City, 1930 (Baum's only high-rise)
- Riverdale Monument (1930)
- Hendricks Chapel, Syracuse University, with John Russell Pope, 1929–1930
- El Vernona Hotel-John Ringling Hotel, Sarasota, 1929 (razed)
- United States Post Office, Flushing, New York, with William Knowles, 1934
- Columbus Circle (Syracuse, NY), 1934

(not chronological)

- Burns Realty Company-Karl Bickel House (1925, 1933 converted to a residence, 101 N. Tamiami Trail Sarasota, FL, NRHP-listed
- El Vernona Apartments-Broadway Apartments, 1133 4th St. Sarasota, FL, NRHP-listed
- El Vernona Hotel-John Ringling Hotel, 111 N. Tamiami Trail Sarasota, FL, NRHP-listed
- Dr. Walter Kennedy House, 1876 Oak St. Sarasota, FL, NRHP-listed
- Pinecroft, 2336 Kipling Ave. Cincinnati, OH, NRHP-listed
- Riverdale Presbyterian Church Complex enlargement (1936), 4761-4765 Henry Hudson Parkway New York, NY, NRHP-listed
- George Schueler House, 76 S. Washington Dr. Sarasota, FL, NRHP-listed
- Sunset Hill (1923), 102 NY 167 Warren, NY, NRHP-listed
- US Post Office-Flushing Main, 41-65 Main St. New York, NY, NRHP-listed

== Bibliography ==
- Baum, Dwight James. "Architect Training at Syracuse." Pencil Points, 1940, issue 2, pp. 107-114.
- Corbett, Harvey Wiley, et al. The Work of Dwight James Baum, Architect. New York: 1927.
- Morrison, William A, editor; Ron McCarty, intro. The Work of Dwight James Baum. New York: Acanthus Press, 2008. ISBN 978-0-926494-48-0
