= El Vernona Hotel–John Ringling Hotel =

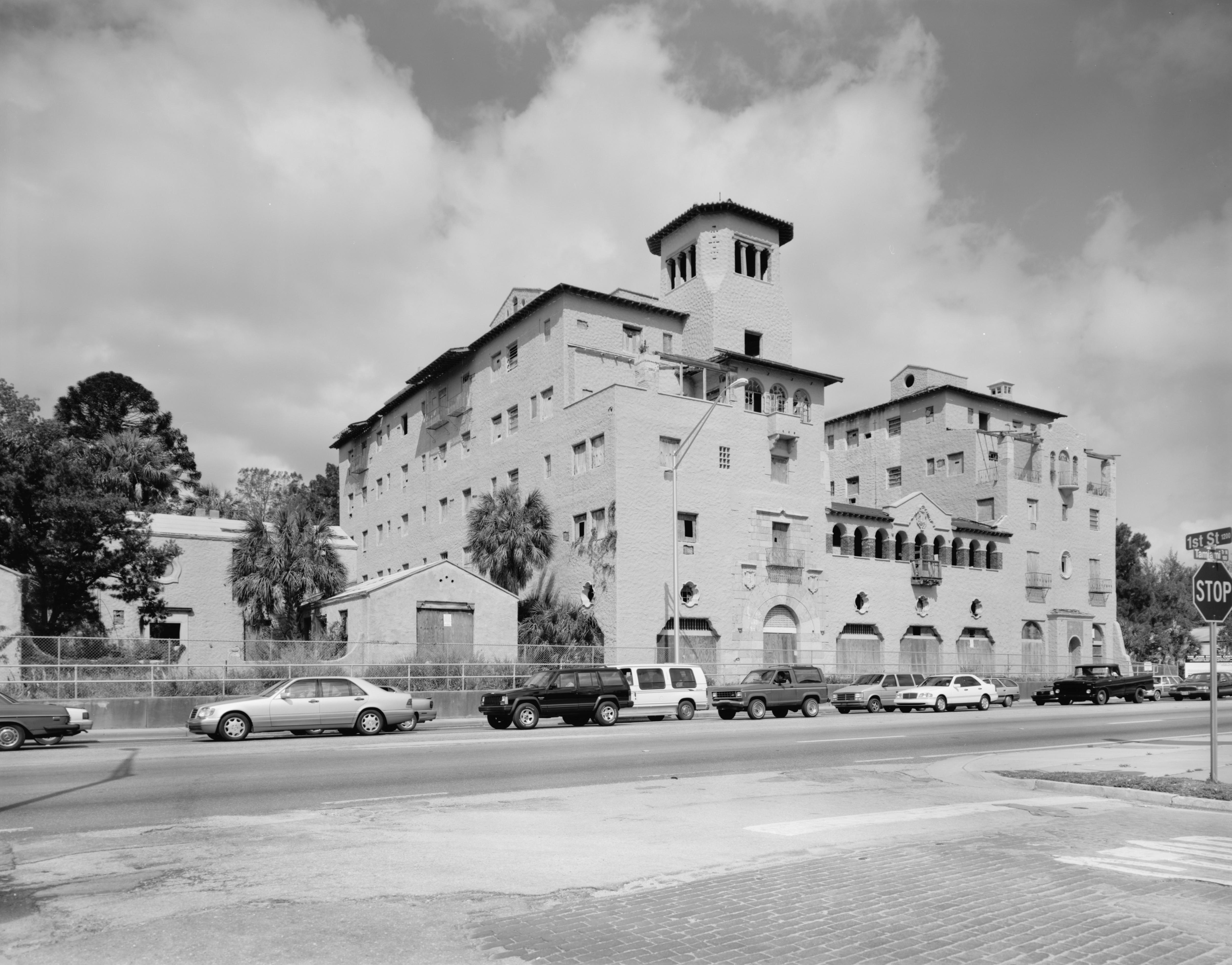
- Front of the hotel
- Interactive map of the El Vernona Hotel–John Ringling Hotel area

General information
- Type: Apartment
- Architectural style: Mediterranean Revival
- Location: 111 Tamiami Trail North, Sarasota, Florida, United States
- Coordinates: 27°20′13″N 82°32′50″W
- Construction started: 1925
- Completed: September 1926
- Opened: December 31, 1926
- Demolished: 1998
- Cost: $800,000 ($14.5 million in 2025 dollars)

Design and construction
- Architect: Dwight James Baum
- Developer: Owen Burns

Other information
- Number of rooms: 150
- El Vernona Hotel–John Ringling Hotel
- U.S. National Register of Historic Places
- Location within Florida Location within the United States
- MPS: Sarasota MRA
- NRHP reference No.: 95000164
- Added to NRHP: March 05, 1987

The El Vernona Hotel–John Ringling Hotel was a famous hotel located at 111 North Tamiami Trail in Sarasota, Florida, United States.

== History ==
The hotel was designed by Dwight James Baum and built in 1926 by developer Owen Burns who named it after his wife. The hotel opened on New Year's Eve 1926. John Ringling bought it after stock market crash of 1929 and renamed it the John Ringling Hotel. In 1964 it was renamed the John Ringling Towers and converted to apartments. By 1980 it was vacant and deteriorating. On March 5, 1987, it was added to the U.S. National Register of Historic Places, but the building was razed in 1998 to make room for the Sarasota Ritz-Carlton.
