= George Schueler House =

Historic house in Florida, United States

- U.S. National Register of Historic Places
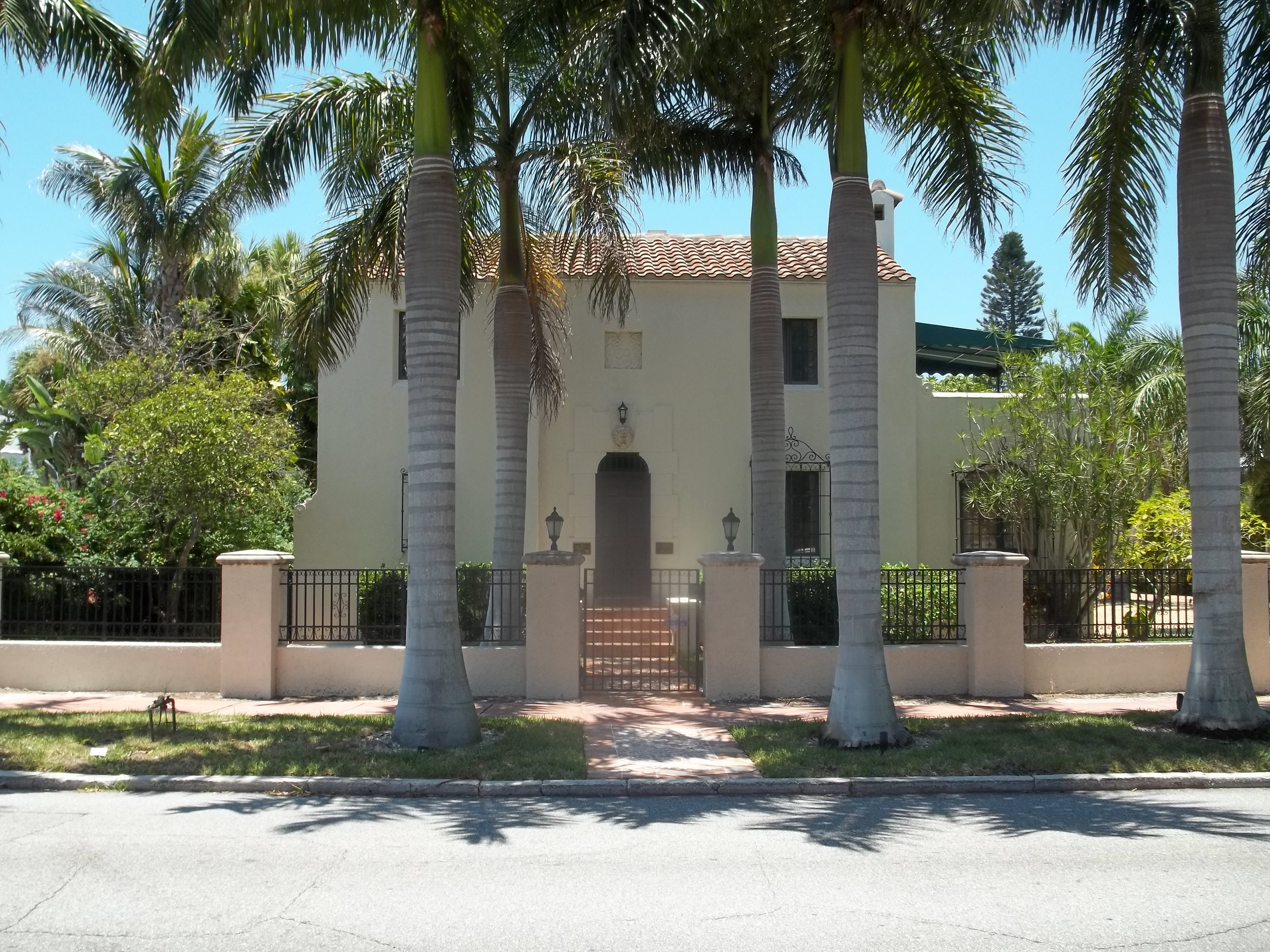

- Location within Florida Location within the United States
- Location: Sarasota, Florida
- Coordinates: 27°19′4″N 82°34′25″W
- Built: 1926
- Architect: Dwight James Baum
- Architectural style: Mission/Spanish Revival
- NRHP reference No.: 97001170
- Added to NRHP: September 26, 1997

The George Schueler House is a historic home in Sarasota, Florida. It is located at 76 South Washington Drive. On September 26, 1997, it was added to the U.S. National Register of Historic Places.
