= Riverdale Monument =

Coordinates: 40.889284°N 73.908304°W

- Riverdale–Spuyten Duyvil–Kingsbridge Memorial Bell Tower
- U.S. National Register of Historic Places
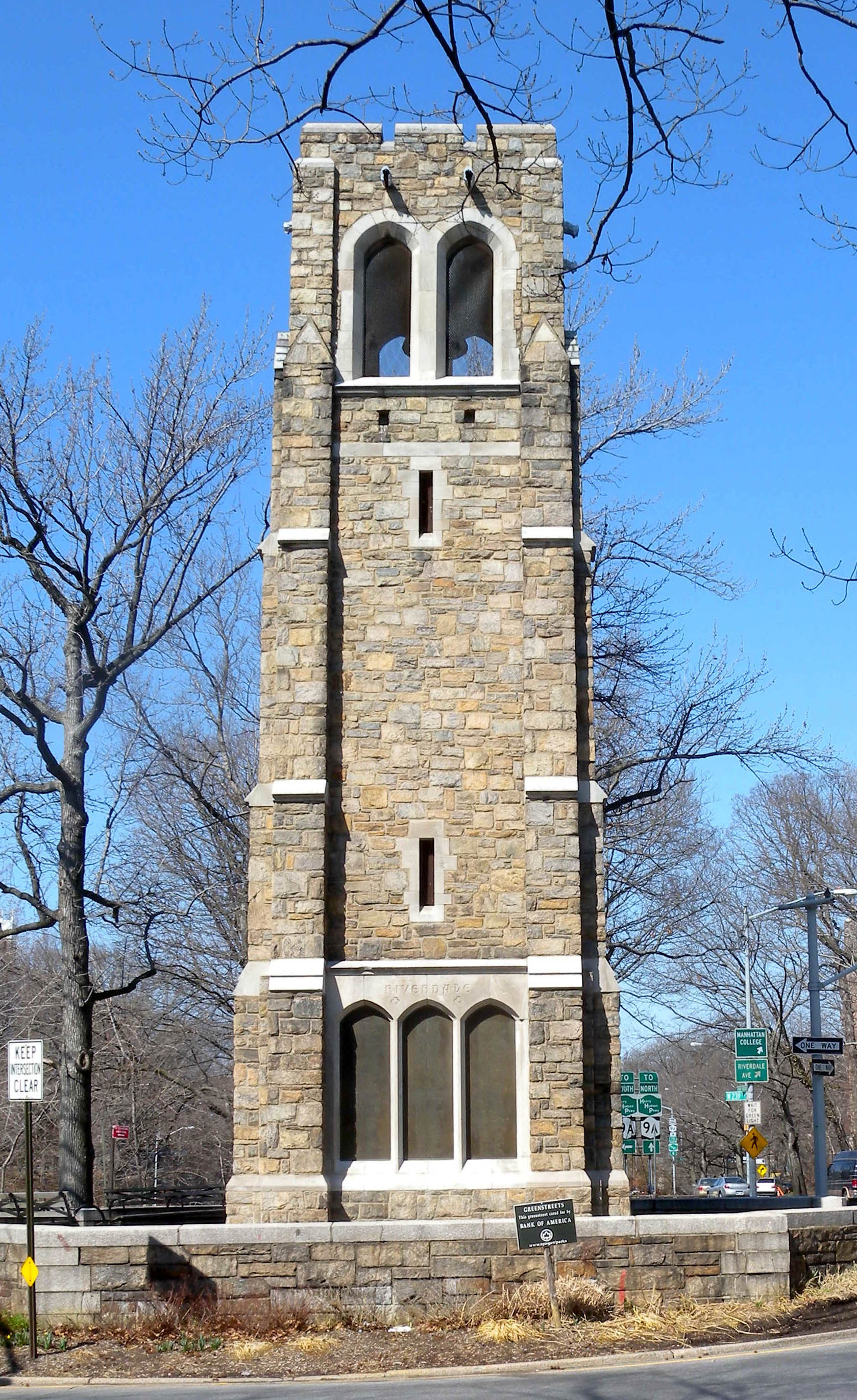

- Location within New York City Location within New York Location within the United States
- Location: Riverdale Avenue at W. 239th St. & Henry Hudson Pkwy, Bronx, New York
- Area: .5 acres
- Built: September 17, 1930
- Built by: John Zambetti, Inc.
- Architect: Dwight James Baum
- NRHP reference No.: 11000967
- Added to NRHP: January 3, 2012

The Riverdale–Spuyten Duyvil–Kingsbridge Memorial Bell Tower or Riverdale Monument is a memorial tower in Bell Tower Park located in the Riverdale section of the Bronx. It was completed on September 17, 1930 to commemorate World War I veterans from the neighborhoods of Riverdale, Spuyten Duyvil, and Kingsbridge. The plaque attached to the memorial lists the names of those Riverdale, Spuyten Duyvil, and Kingsbridge residents who served in World War I. In 1936, it was moved 700 feet south to make room for the Henry Hudson Parkway which it now stands next to. It was listed on the National Register of Historic Places on January 3, 2012.

== Description ==
The 50 feet (15 m) tall and 17.5 feet (5.3 m) wide monument is located on West 239th street between Riverdale Avenue and the Henry Hudson Parkway. It was designed by Dwight James Baum for the Riverdale American Legion Post and built by John Zambetti, Inc. It is made of fieldstone and Indiana limestone and is estimated to weigh 500 tons. In the tower is a 1762 Spanish bell which had been made for a Mexican monastery. General Winfield Scott captured this bell during the Mexican War and brought it back to New York City where it resided in the Jefferson Market and a Riverdale firehouse before it was installed in the newly constructed tower.
