= Sarasota Times Building =

- U.S. National Register of Historic Places
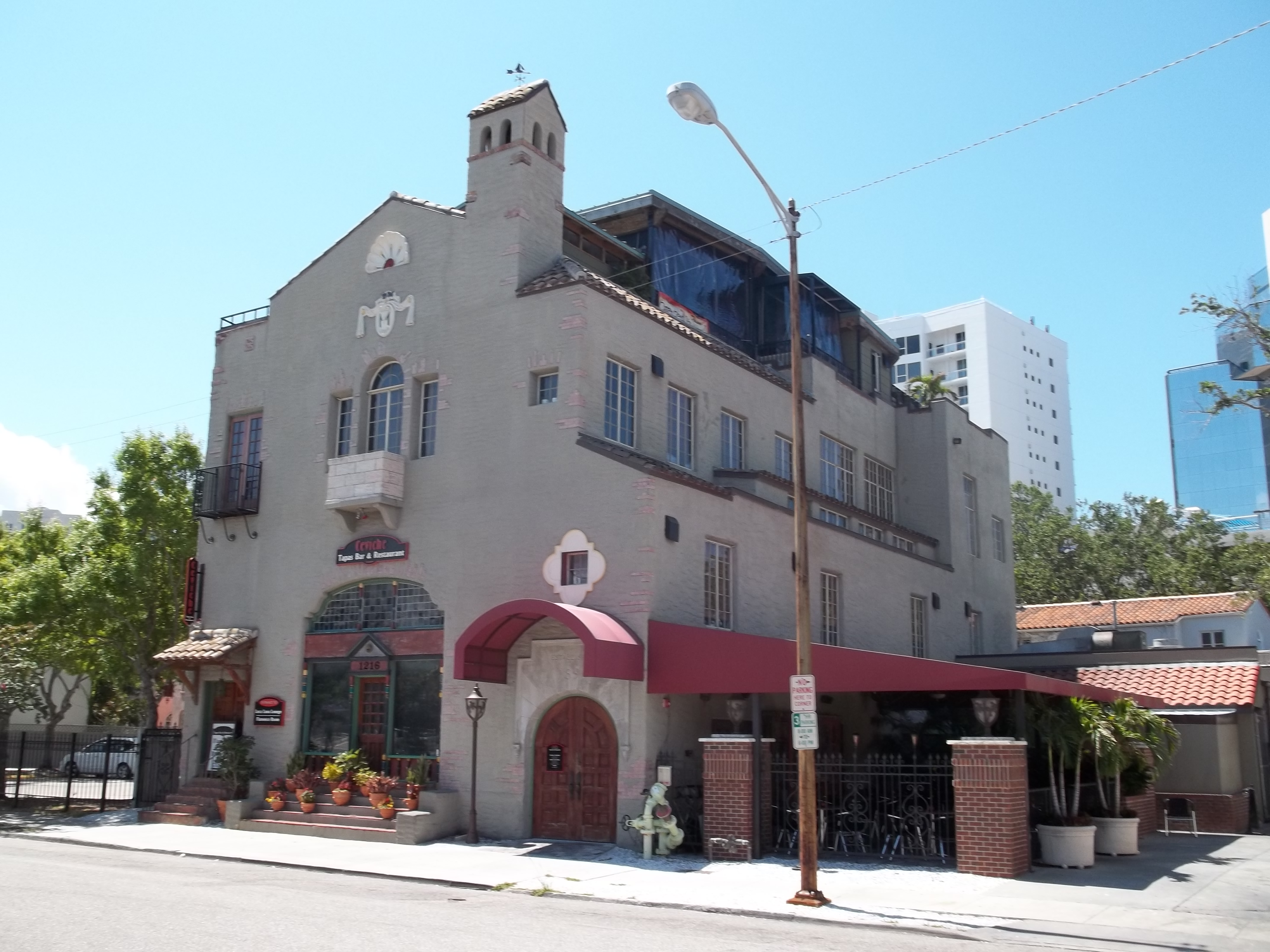

- Location within Florida Location within the United States
- Location: Sarasota, Florida
- Coordinates: 27°20′12″N 82°32′46″W
- Architect: Dwight James Baum
- MPS: Sarasota MRA
- NRHP reference No.: 84003845
- Added to NRHP: March 22, 1984

The Sarasota Times Building is a historic site in Sarasota, Florida. It is located at 1214–1216 1st Street. On March 22, 1984, it was added to the U.S. National Register of Historic Places. The three-story asymmetrically-massed, stucco and cast stone façade, Mediterranean Revival structure was designed by architect Dwight James Baum. It is significant to Sarasota's heritage for its role as a newspaper established in 1899, and also for its architectural merits.

== History ==
The three-story Mediterranean Revival Style structure located at 1214, 1216, and 1218 First Street was designed in 1925 by the architect Dwight James Baum as the headquarters of the Sarasota Times newspaper. By November 1925 the construction firm of Ricketts and Haworth had started work on the foundations of the Sarasota Times Building but ceased work due to the revision of the original plans for the building. The Times Building was designed in the Mediterranean Revival Style which was in keeping with the other Baum designed projects under construction or planned for the Broadway area including the Burns Realty Company, the El Vernona Hotel (Later called John Ringling Towers, now demolished) and the El Vernona Apartment (Currently called Belle Haven Apartments). The Times Building also abutted the residence of the editor and owner of the paper, L.D. Reagin, whose house was located on North Palm Avenue.

The Sarasota Times newspaper, which was purchased by Mr. Reagin in March 1924, was a significant communications force in the development of Sarasota, having been founded in 1899. Formerly located at 241 Main Street, the new site of the plant and offices was indicative of the shift in the commercial development away from lower Main Street.

The architect of record, Dwight James Baum, was responsible for many of the most significant buildings constructed in Sarasota in the 1920s including John Ringling's palatial home, the Ca da'Zan, the Sarasota County Courthouse, and the four Mediterranean Revival Style buildings in the Broadway area. Having traveled in Southern California, Mr. Baum had studied the examples of the Mission Revival Style and the Spanish Colonial Revival Style in California. It was the product of a detailed study of Spanish Colonial Revival architecture made by Bertram Grovesnor Goodhue in Mexico.

In 1915, at the Panama–California Exposition in San Diego, Goodhue and Carleton Winslow Sr. designed a complex of buildings that featured the rich architectural variety found in colonial Latin America. Encouraged by the publicity afforded the exposition, other architects began to also look to Spain where they found other interesting building traditions. Many of the California elements Baum studied influenced his designs for Sarasota buildings.

In Florida, the Spanish eclectic style was among the most dominant building styles during the 1920s continued to be built into the 1930s. It was adapted for a variety of building types ranging from grandiose tourist hotels to two-room residences. It was so popular that many commercial and residential buildings were renovated in the 1920s to reflect the style. Identifying features of the style include flat (sometimes hip) roofs. Usually with some form of parapet; ceramic tile roof surfacing; stuccoed facades; flat roof entrance porches, commonly with arched openings supported by square columns; casement and double-hung sash windows; and ceramic tile decorations.

The design of the Times Building is one of Mr. Baum's most successful; the variety of architectural elements, including the use of three different door types and enframements on the ground floor elevation of the Times Building is particularly effective on a relatively small-scaled building. Following the crash of the land prices and the onset of the Depression, the Sarasota Times newspaper went into receivership. The Times Building was subsequently used as the office of the "Tree-Ripe Citrus Products, Inc. which was owned and operated by Mr. Owen Burns.

BFM Enterprises Inc., a Sarasota company managed by Donald E. Murphy, had owned the 10,584- square-foot building since April 2004. Ceviche Tapas Bar, part of a Florida chain, opened in early 2008 with a Spanish-themed menu that features small plates, seafood, paella and cazuela. While on First Street, Ceviche also hosted numerous civic events, including wrap parties for the Sarasota Film Festival. Ceviche relocates a few years later and the Sarasota Times Building has been back on the market since 2012.

In 2014, Ataraxia LLC, a Nokomis company managed by Sharon Carole, purchased the historic downtown building. Carole began renovations for the new restaurant that opened in 2019 and graced Sarasota with its presence: "Sage," which aims to bring a global culinary experience to the artsy town of Sarasota using the highest quality and freshest ingredients as possible. Dishes are made to be as if you are actually dining in that specific country of origin.

Chef Chistopher Covelli, Chef at Sage, is a graduate of the French Culinary Institute in New York City where he was trained by world-renowned chefs including André Soltner, Jacques Pépin and Alain Sailhac. His background, training and living experiences have enabled him to speak five languages and specialize in Classic French, Italian and Spanish cuisine as well as American Haute Cuisine.

The Sarasota Times Building was locally designated by the City of Sarasota in 1985.
