= Zoller-Frasier Round Barn =

- U.S. National Register of Historic Places
- Location within New York Location within the United States
- Nearest city: Newville, New York
- Coordinates: 42°58′21″N 74°46′34″W
- Area: 1.2 acres (0.49 ha)
- Built: 1895
- Architectural style: Round Barn
- MPS: Central Plan Dairy Barns of New York TR
- NRHP reference No.: 84002401
- Added to NRHP: September 29, 1984

Zoller-Frasier Round Barn is a historic round barn located at Newville in Herkimer County, New York. It was built about 1895 and is approximately 80 feet in diameter. It is constructed of clapboard sided stud walls above a low mortared stone foundation. It is built surrounding a self-supporting central silo.

It was listed on the National Register of Historic Places in 1984.
