= Dr. Walter Kennedy House =

Historic house in Florida, United States

- U.S. National Register of Historic Places
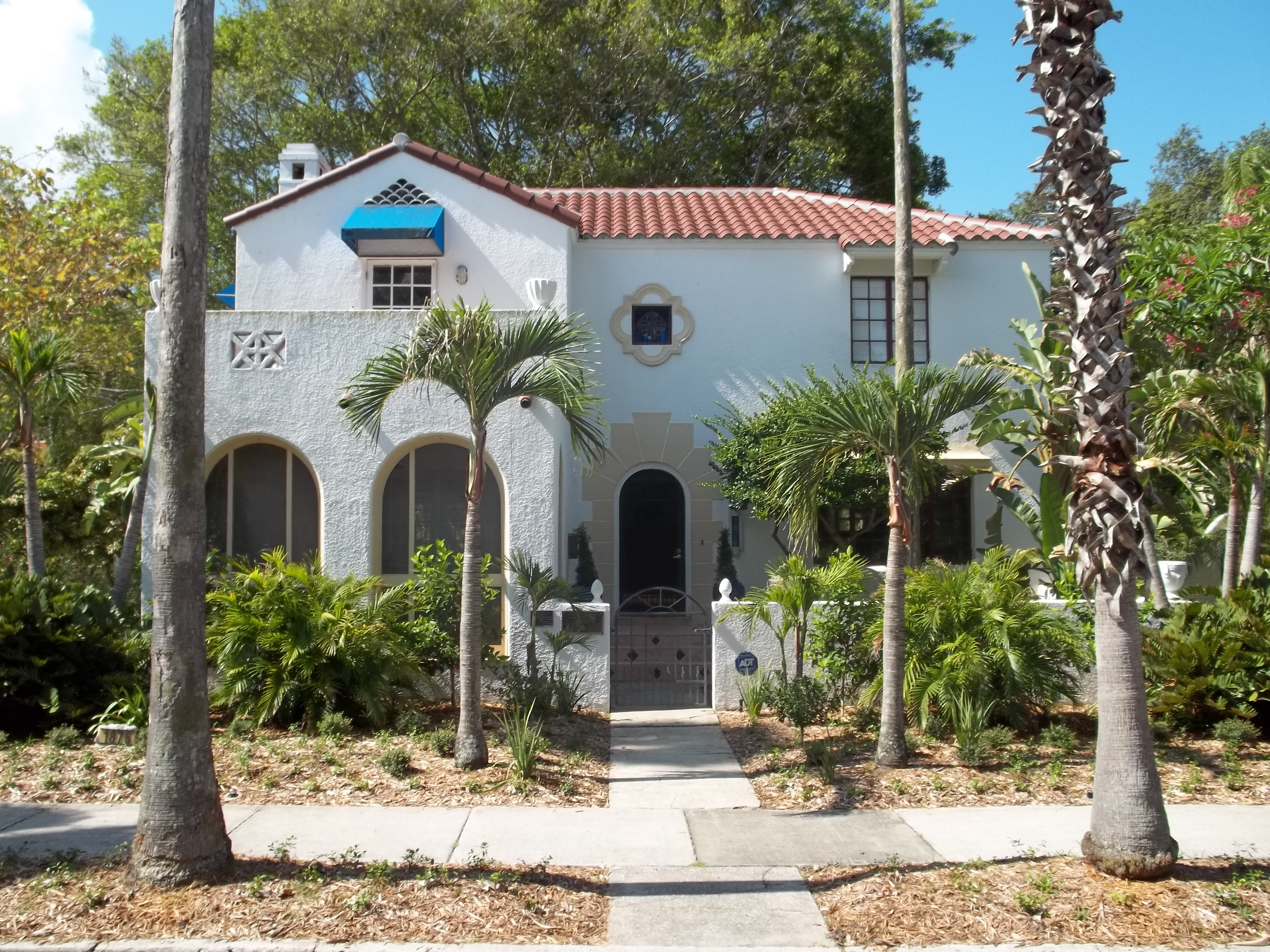

- Location within Florida Location within the United States
- Location: Sarasota, Florida
- Coordinates: 27°19′53″N 82°31′59″W
- Architect: Dwight James Baum
- Architectural style: Mission/Spanish Revival
- NRHP reference No.: 94000349
- Added to NRHP: April 14, 1994

The Dr. Walter Kennedy House is a historic home in Sarasota, Florida. It is located at 1876 Oak Street. On April 14, 1994, it was added to the U.S. National Register of Historic Places.

== References and external links ==
- Laurel Park National Register of Historic Places District
- Sarasota County listings at National Register of Historic Places
- Sarasota County listings at Florida's Office of Cultural and Historical Programs
