= United States Post Office (Flushing, Queens) =

Historic post office in Queens, New York

- US Post Office-Flushing Main
- U.S. National Register of Historic Places
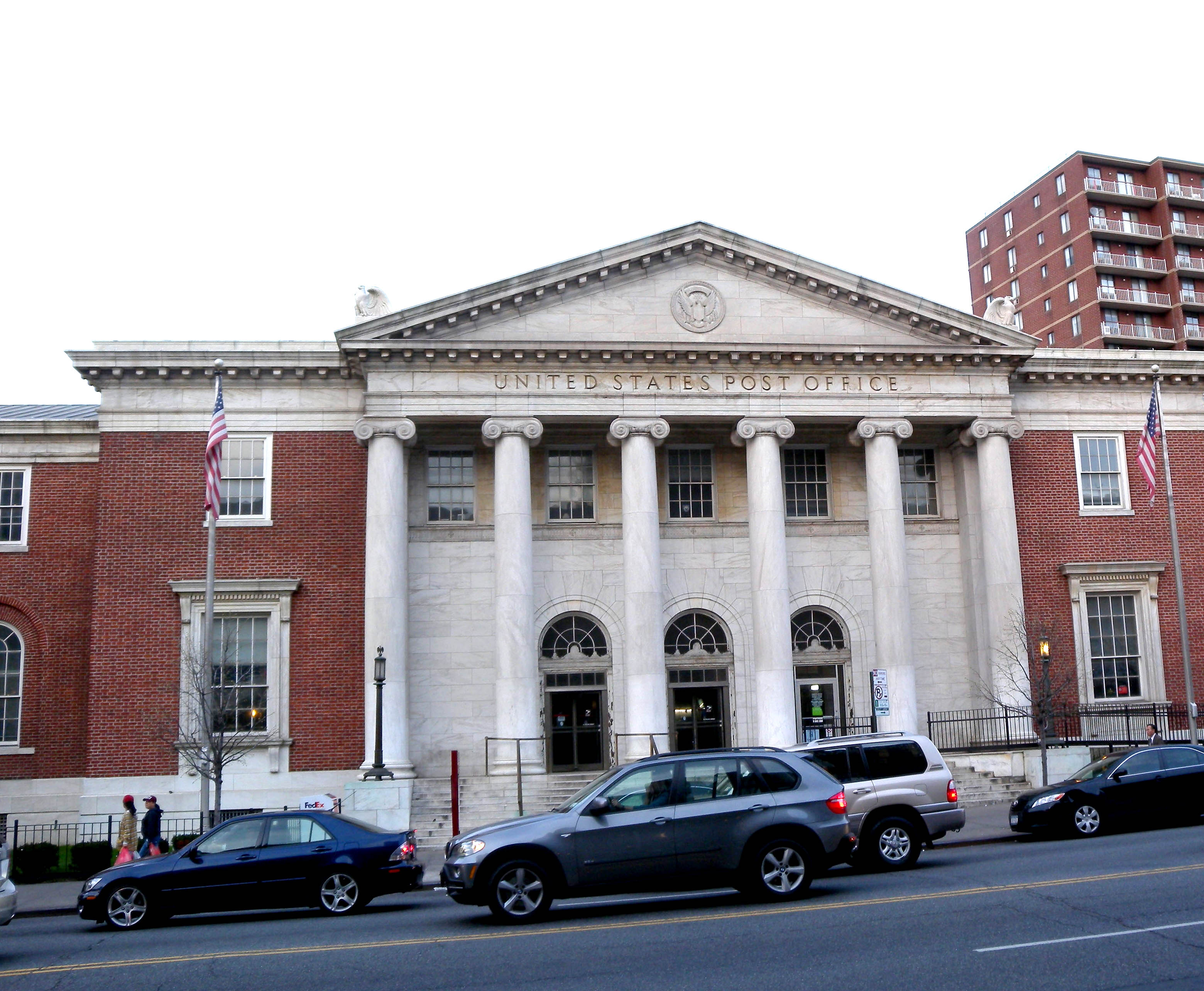
- Flushing Main Post Office, April 2009

- Location within New York City Location within New York Location within the United States
- Location: 4165 Main St., Flushing, Queens
- Coordinates: 40.7564°N 73.8283°W
- Area: less than one acre
- Built: 1932
- Architect: Dwight James Baum, William W. Knowles
- Architectural style: Colonial Revival
- MPS: US Post Offices in New York State, 1858-1943, TR
- NRHP reference No.: 88002507
- Added to NRHP: November 17, 1988

US Post Office-Flushing Main is a historic post office building located at Flushing in Queens County, New York, United States. It was designed and built between 1932 and 1934 by architect Dwight James Baum and William W. Knowles as consulting architects to the Office of the Supervising Architect. It is a symmetrically massed, two-story steel frame building clad in oversize handmade red brick with marble trim in the Colonial Revival style. Its main facade features an entrance portico consisting of six Ionic columns that support a full pedimented entablature. The interior features a mural executed in 1933-34 by Vincent Aderente.

It was listed on the National Register of Historic Places in 1988.
