= Pinecroft =

Historic house in Ohio, United States

- U.S. National Register of Historic Places
- U.S. Historic district
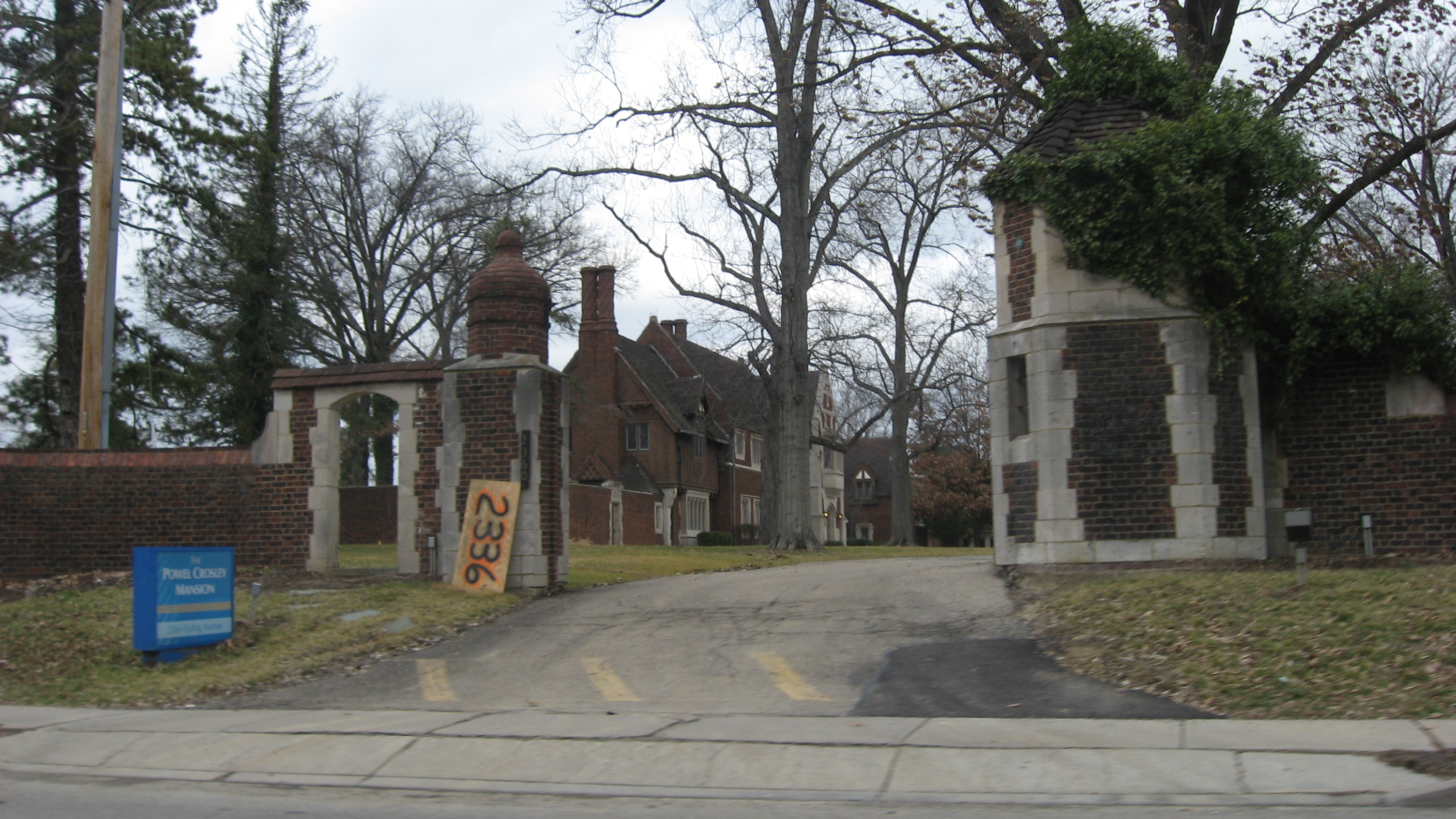
- Driveway view of the house

- Location within Ohio
- Location: 2366 Kipling Ave., Cincinnati, Hamilton County, Ohio
- Coordinates: 39°12′10″N 84°34′13″W
- Area: 32.06 acres (129,700 m^{2})
- Built: 1928–1937
- Architect: Dwight James Baum
- NRHP reference No.: 08001197
- Added to NRHP: December 17, 2008

Pinecroft, also known as the Powel Crosley Jr. Estate is located at 2366 Kipling Avenue in the Mount Airy neighborhood of Cincinnati, Ohio. It is significant both as a Tudor Revival estate designed by Dwight James Baum, and for its association with the life of Powel Crosley Jr. (1886–1961), builder of the Crosley car and owner of the Cincinnati Reds. It was listed on the National Register of Historic Places on December 17, 2008.

It is the 25th property listed as a featured property of the week in a program of the National Park Service that began in July, 2008.

== See also ==
- National Register of Historic Places listings in Ohio
