= Vincent Aderente =

American painter

Vincent Aderente (February 20, 1880 Naples, Italy - 1941 Bayside, Queens) was an Italian American muralist.

He studied at the Art Students League, and worked on the Waldorf-Astoria Hotel Ballroom. He was an assistant to Edwin Blashfield.

His work is at St. Matthew's Cathedral, the Denver Mint, the Detroit Public Library, the House Chamber in the Utah State Capitol Building, the United States Post Office (Flushing, Queens), the Queens County Court House, Kings County Hospital, the Long Island Savings Bank, and Codington County Courthouse (1929).

He lived in Queens. His papers are in the Archives of American Art, and the Detroit Public Library.

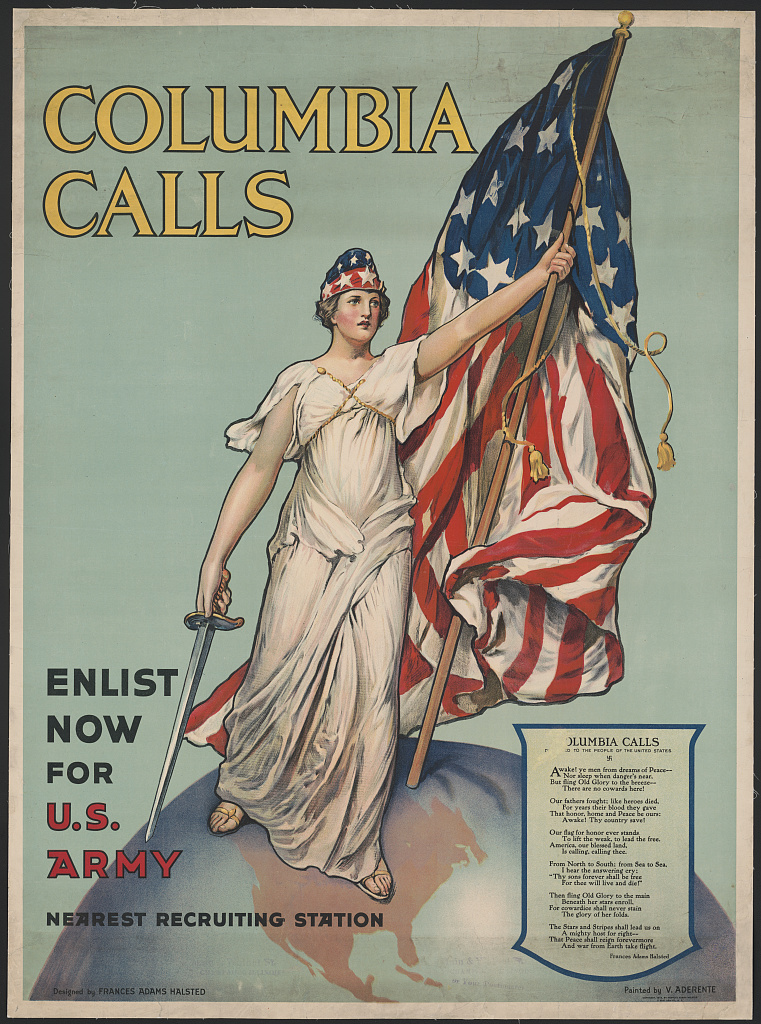
Columbia Calls - Enlist Now for U.S. Army - poster by Aderente

Aderente's art was also used in First World War propaganda. His painting of Columbia, standing atop the United States and charging forward with a billowing flag and sword at her side, was appears on at least two official recruiting posters from this period.
