= Newville, New York =

- hamlet
- Location within New York Location within the United States
- Coordinates: 42°58′35″N 74°49′33″W
- Country: United States
- State: New York
- County: Herkimer
- Town: Danube
- Elevation: 538 ft (164 m)
- Time zone: UTC-5 (Eastern (EST))
  - Summer (DST): UTC-4 (EDT)
- Area code: 315
- GNIS feature ID: 958538

Newville is a hamlet in the town of Danube, in Herkimer County, New York, United States. Newville is located on Nowadaga Creek, 4.9 miles (7.9 km) south-southeast of Little Falls.

It is the location of the Zoller-Frasier Round Barn, built c.1895, which is listed on the National Register of Historic Places.
