= Nowadaga Creek =

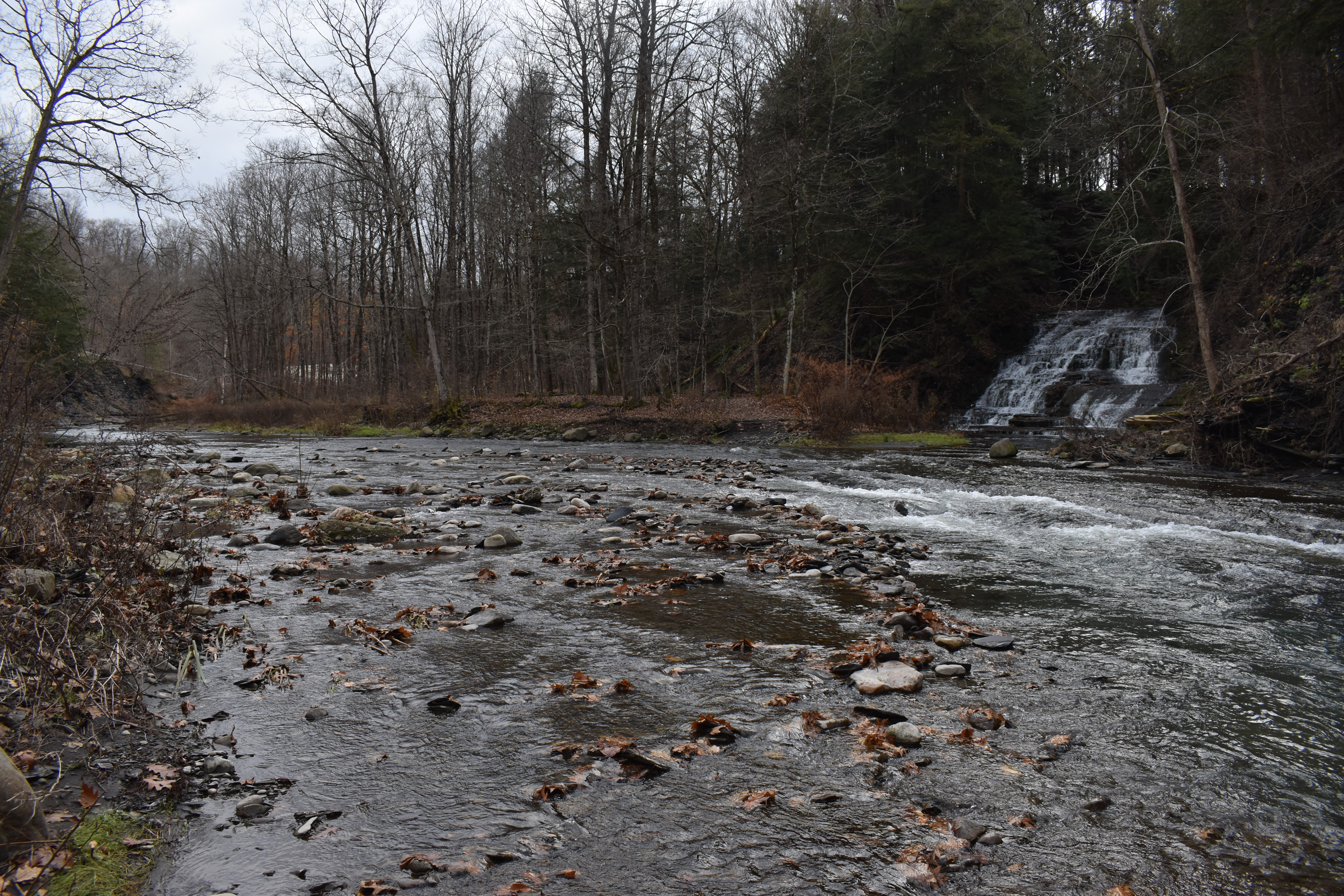
- Nowadaga Creek with tributary waterfall in background

- Location of the mouth of Nowadaga Creek Nowadaga Creek (the United States)

Location
- Country: United States
- State: New York
- Region: Central New York
- County: Herkimer

Physical characteristics
- Source
  - location: North-northeast of Paines Hollow
  - coordinates: 42°58′33″N 74°53′09″W
  - elevation: 558 ft (170 m)
- Mouth: Erie Canal
  - location: Indian Castle
  - coordinates: 43°00′35″N 74°46′25″W
  - elevation: 325 ft (99 m)
- Basin size: 31.4 sq mi (81 km^{2})

Basin features
- Progression: Nowadaga Creek → Erie Canal → Mohawk River → Hudson River → Upper New York Bay
- Tributaries
  - right: Ohisa Creek

Nowadaga Creek is a river in Herkimer County in the state of New York. The basin drains portions of the towns of Danube, Stark, and Little Falls, as well as a small portion of the town of Warren, in southern Herkimer County before converging with the Erie Canal in Indian Castle, New York. The drainage basin is approximately 49 percent forested. The creek has an average slope of 1.7 percent over its entire stream length of 10.0 miles. On a 1790 land patent map it is spelled "Inchanando Creek".

== Geology ==
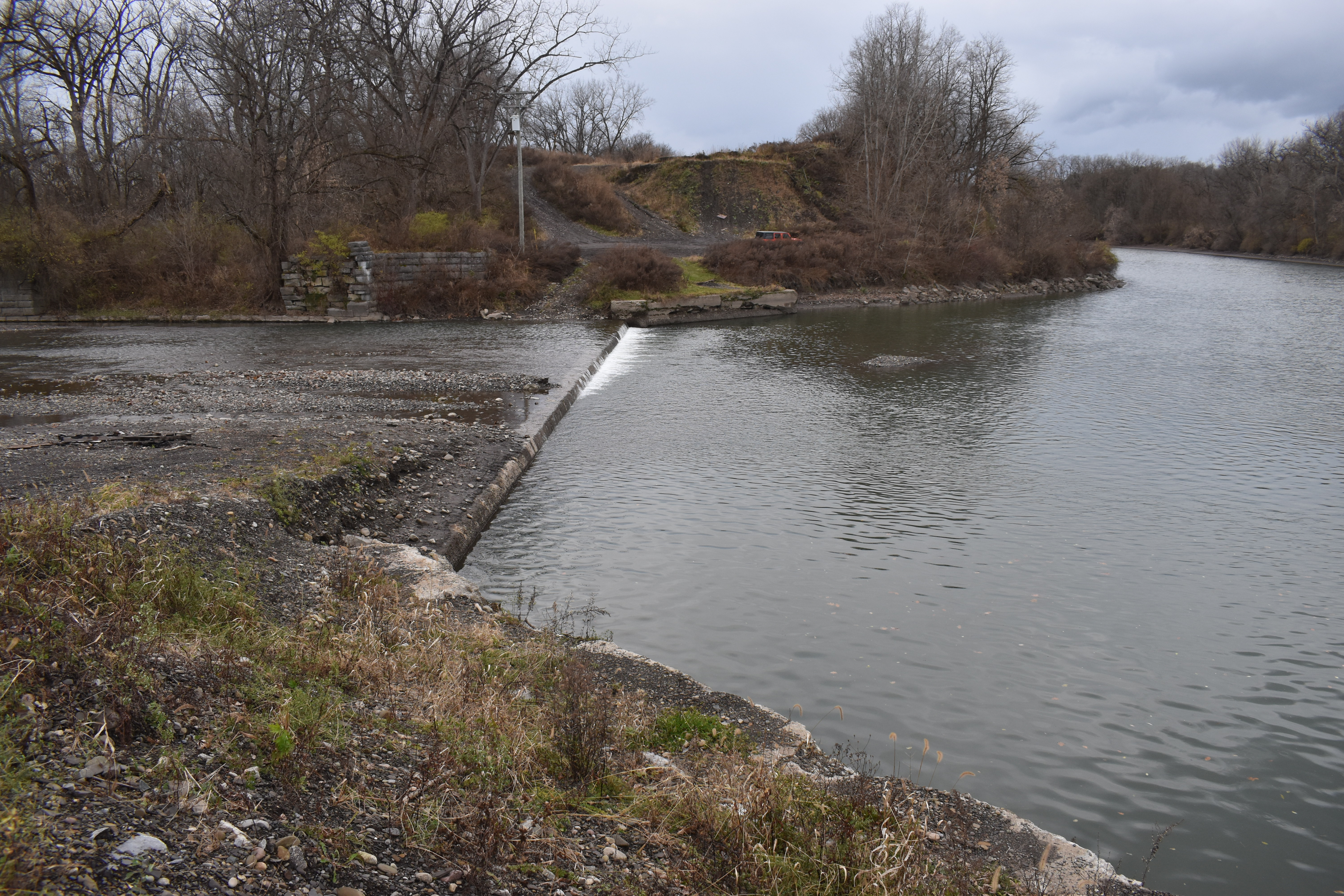
Mouth of Nowadaga Creek at Erie Canal

Nowadaga Creek flows over a bedrock bed for much of its length and, therefore, is not subject to alluvial processes as seen in many similarly sized river basins. Despite its natural and relatively undeveloped setting, for much of its length the creek lacks a well- developed natural floodplain. In many areas along the creek, the bedrock channel is disintegrating, and pieces of stone that originate from the channel bed are conveyed downstream and deposited in lower velocity reaches of the channel, contributing to debris jams, avulsions, and flooding.
