= Sarasota County Courthouse =

- U.S. National Register of Historic Places
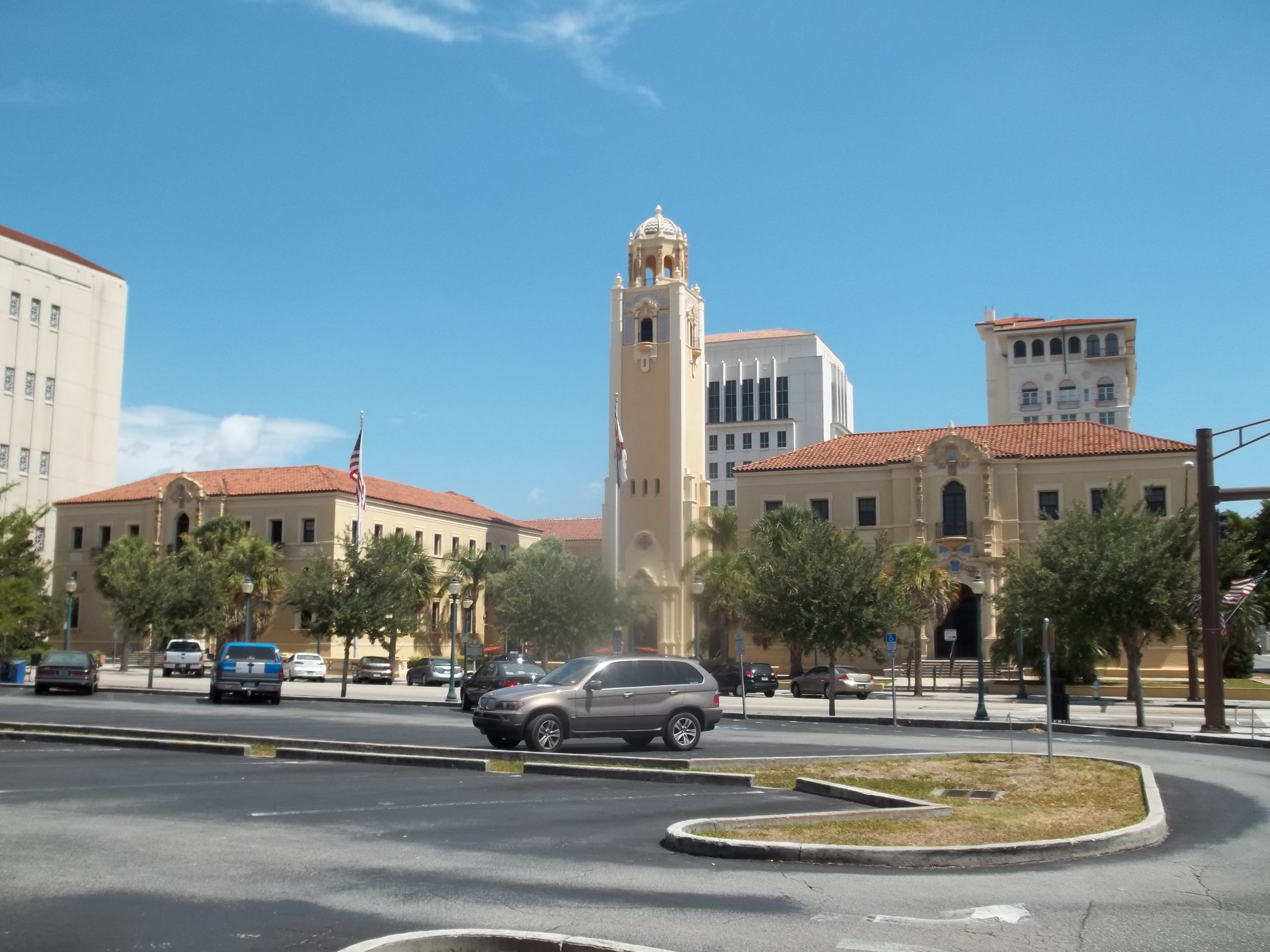

- Location within Florida Location within the United States
- Interactive map showing the location of Sarasota County Courthouse
- Location: 2000 Main Street; Sarasota, Florida
- Coordinates: 27°20′8″N 82°31′50″W
- Built: 1926–1927
- Architect: Dwight James Baum
- Architectural style: Spanish/Mediterranean Revival
- MPS: Sarasota MRA
- NRHP reference No.: 84003842
- Added to NRHP: March 22, 1984

The Old Sarasota County Courthouse is a historic courthouse building located in Sarasota, Florida, United States. Designed by architect Dwight James Baum in the Mediterranean Revival style, it was built in 1926–1927 by Stevenson and Cameron, Inc. of New York.

== History ==
The County Commission planned to construct a courthouse since late 1924, after the county separated from Manatee County in July 1921. Charles and Edith Ringling conveyed land for the building. In March 1925, the County Commission hired Dwight James Baum as the architect for the courthouse. In September 1925, they awarded the construction contract to Stevenson and Cameron, Inc. of New York.

On March 22, 1984, it was added to the National Register of Historic Places as part of the Sarasota Multiple Resource Area (MRA).

== New courthouse ==
The county left the building and used the Judge Lynn N. Silvertooth Judicial Center in Sarasota and the South County Courthouse in Venice, Florida. In August 2026 a new 100 million dollar Sarasota County Courthouse opened at 1 Apex Road off Fruitville Road. Celery Fields is behind it. It is 124,000 square feet. The Fruitville Library is nearby.

== Gallery ==
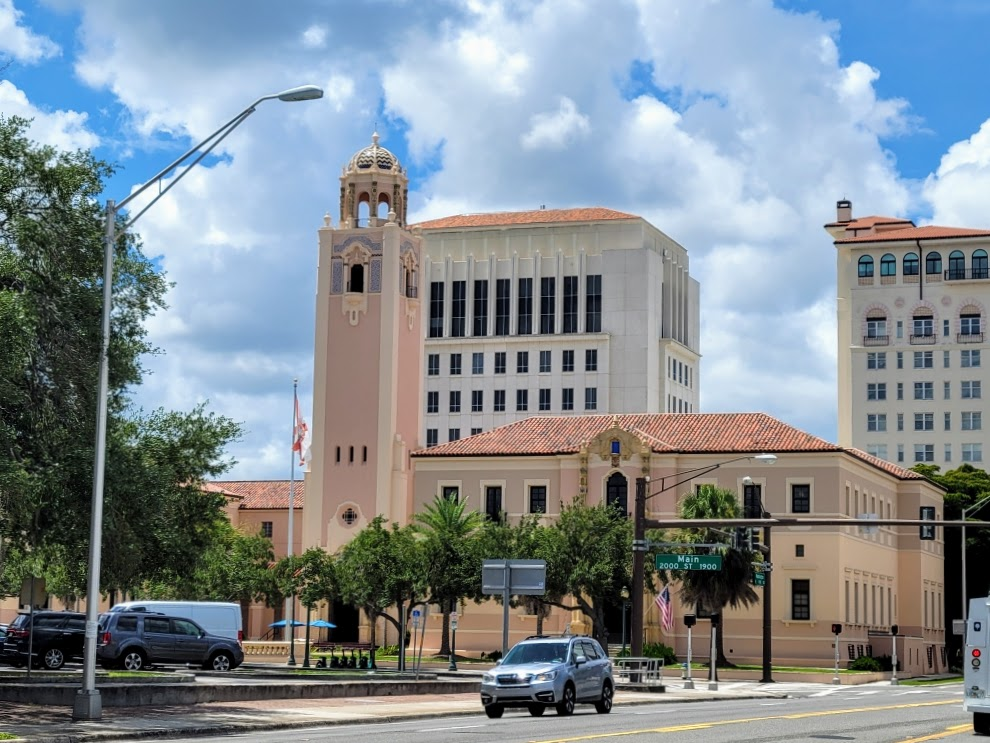
Sarasota County Courthouse July 2022

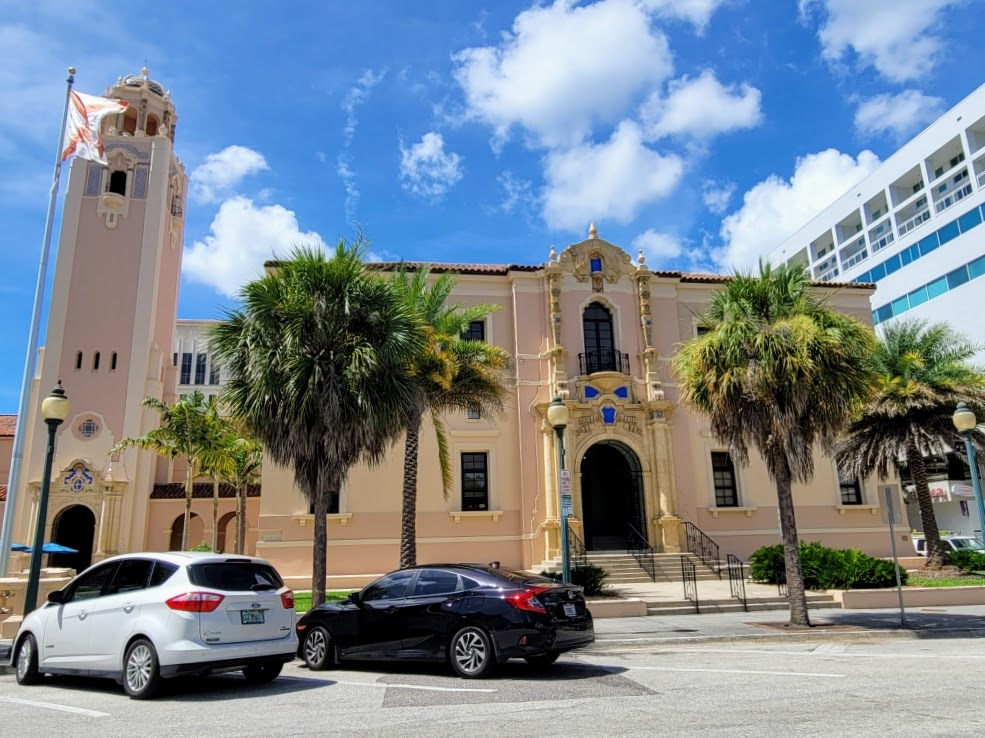
Sarasota County Courthouse July 2022

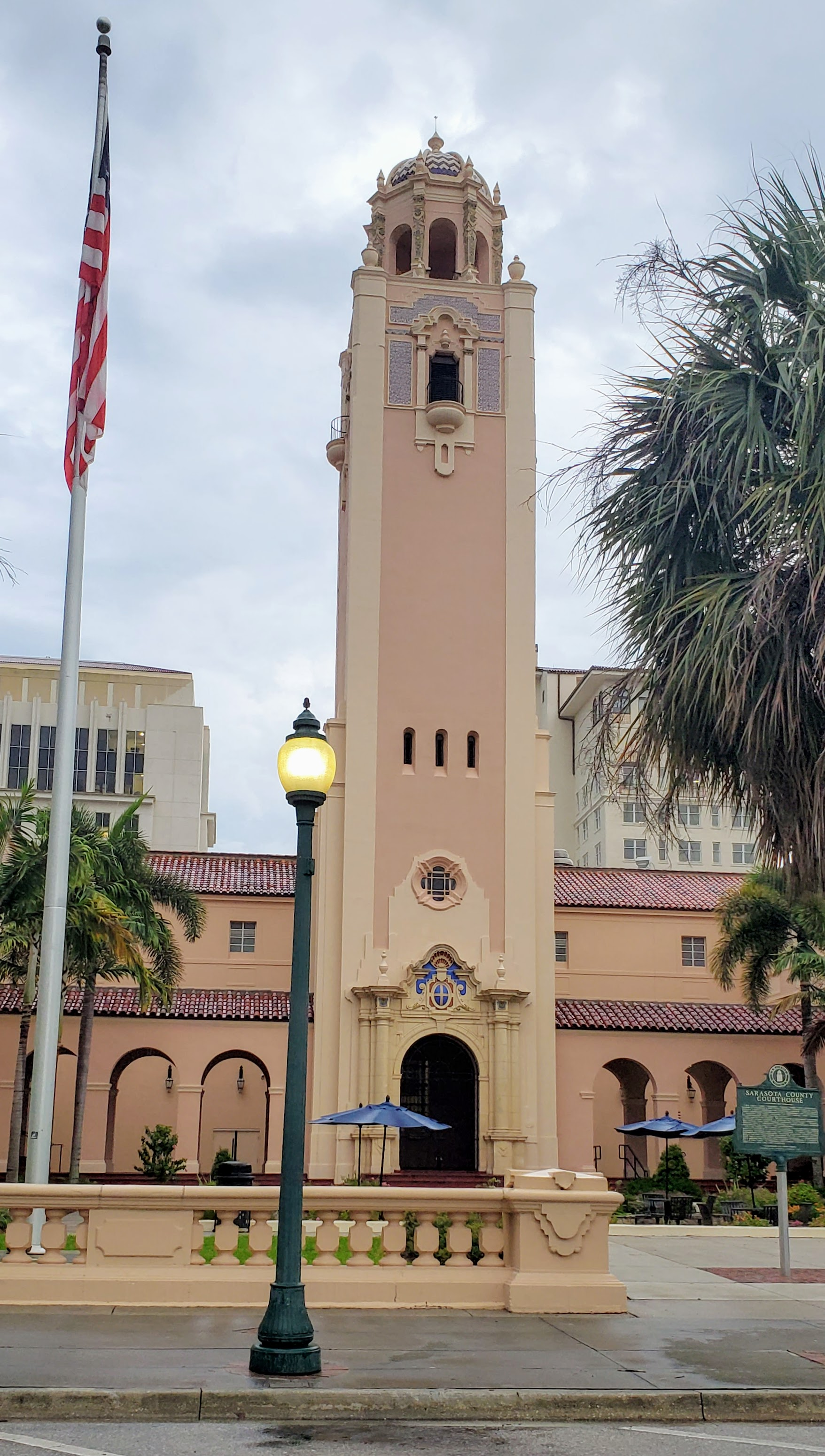
Sarasota County Courthouse June 2022
