= Sarasota Chalk Festival =

American cultural event

- 2010 Sarasota Chalk Festival poster for a week-long event, design by Jeff Bleitz
- Status: Active
- Genre: Festival
- Frequency: Annually
- Location: Sarasota, Florida
- Coordinates: 27.079326°N 82.442147°W
- Country: U.S.
- Founded: 2007; 19 years ago
- Founder: Denise Kowal
- Organiser: Avenida de Colores, Inc.
- Website: Official website

Sarasota Chalk Festival is an American cultural event of public art that celebrates a performing art form of pavement art also known as Italian street painting. It was founded in Sarasota, Florida by Denise Kowal. During the festival artists use chalk, and occasionally special paint, to paint the road surface to create large works of art while the viewer can watch the creative process. The festival is focused around the street artists who are known as Madonnari in Italy or commonly referred to Street Painters, Chalk Artists, Sidewalk Artists, or Pavement Artists. The festival is held annually in downtown Sarasota in Burns Square.

On October 28, 2013, the festival was featured by The New York Times as a destination recommended on its Guide to Intelligent Travel.

== History ==
In 2010 during its third season, the Sarasota Chalk Festival became the first international street painting festival in the United States of America, inviting artists from around the world to participate. Setting a unique theme for each year was instituted for the planning of each annual event with that year as well. Documenting the origins, diversity, spirit, appeal, and growing popularity of street painting, filming for a 2013 film on modern street painting around the world began with scenes and interviews at the first international Sarasota festival; a video production describing the film was released in February 2012.

A book, Sarasota Chalk Festival (right), was published by the festival organization in time for availability at the 2011 festival. The 214-page book, described as a collector edition, provides an extensive history of the street painting it features and discusses many of the artists who have become famous for performing the art at various locations around the world. Many of these artists were invited to the debut of broadening the scope of the festival to international status. The book provides examples of their work—either here or abroad. Many of the artists return each year, so the material remains timely as well as historic. It also describes the music and arts on Sarasota's "Cultural Coast" and the many attractive Sarasota beaches on the Gulf of Mexico. The book has been available at each festival since its publication and always is available at the festival offices.

=== — 2010 — Halloween ===
The theme of the 2010 festival was Halloween. Many renowned street painters from all over the world participated in the event that was held October 25 through October 31. More than 80,000 people attended the seven-day event, and in an unprecedented action prompted by the popularity of the festival, the municipal government extended the street closure for an additional day so people could view the completed artworks. Several documentaries were created about the 2010 festival that were released locally and in Europe, including the first documentary on Street Painting to be released at the Grazie di Curtatone 24-hour Madonnari Competition, August 15, 2012. Sarasota Chalk Festival founder Denise Kowal was invited to be a judge at the 2011 Grazie di Curtatone, making her the second foreigner and first American to be invited to judge this prestigious festival that was the first street painting festival in the world. The Grazie di Curtatone festival is celebrating its fortieth anniversary in 2012 and Denise Kowal was invited again to be a judge of the competition.

The featured artist at the Sarasota festival, Maestro Madonnaro and Guinness World Record holder, Edgar Mueller, created a three-dimensional (3D) street painting that made history for introducing a new perspective in street art that with special equipment may be seen in three-dimensions. This ground-breaking street painting also appeared to change from a giant by day, to a fetus by night, through the use of photoluminescent paints and artificial lighting. It measured 100' x 40'.

A second guest artist and first Guinness World Record holder for a street painter, Tracy Lee Stum, also was featured in 2010. She created a two-point perspective 65' x 30' 3D interactive Mousetrap game and completed the installation with assistance from Sharyn Namnath, Julio Jimenez, Charlene Lanzel, and Fred Wilms. A third Guinness World Record holder, Leon Keer, traveled from the Netherlands and won third place for his original street painting featuring depictions of Alice in Wonderland and Little Red Riding Hood.

Genna Panzarella, the first woman to be awarded the Maestra Madonnaro title in Grazie di Curtatone, Italy, created a giant painting of a skeletal horse during the festival. and Maestro Madonnaro Vera Bugatti traveled from Italy to America for the first time in order to create her original street painting, incorporating a Batman theme.

The 2010 festival supported several secondary events held on its fringes. They included the Hallowscreen Fringe Film Festival with indoor and outdoor movies organized by executive director Lori Bowen, the France Engels Couture 60' Runway Show in cooperation with Carrianna Hutchinson, Sarasota's Largest Pumpkin Carving Contest, a performance stage with multiple artists such as flutist Jane Hoffman and guitarist Rick Peterson, the Moving Ethos Dance Company, the West Coast Civic Ballet, the Jump Dance Company, The Garbage-Men, and the Dragonfly Café Poets.

=== — 2011 — Pavement art through the ages ===
In 2011, with the theme 'Pavement Art Through the Ages', the Sarasota Chalk Festival attracted 250 renowned pavement artists from all over the world. Artists from France, Australia, Germany, Canada, Peru, Spain, Mexico, Netherlands, Japan, Italy, France, and Brazil as well as from almost every state in the United States traveled to participate in the week-long festival that drew 200,000 visitors.

Three-dimensional A museum gallery displaying works by Kurt Wenner, the innovator of three-dimensional (3D) pavement art, was held and Wenner presented six lectures and demonstrations as well as creating a street painting with students as an instructional lesson on perspective during the event. Wenner had started the first street painting festival in the United States more than 25 years previously.

Dutch artist Leon Keer returned to the festival and, along with other members of Planet Street Painting, executed a 3D depiction of China's Terracotta Army in Lego. This piece attracted international media attention including videos on the work. It was painted in conjunction with the appearance of a 9-feet-tall Lego man, by artist Ego Leonard, that washed up on Siesta Key in Sarasota on October 25, 2011, with the words, "No Real Than You Are", emblazoned on his green T-shirt. The giant Lego man was "arrested" on charges of "loitering" by the Sarasota County sheriff, and many attempts were made to release Ego Leonard in time for him to attend the festival. Unfortunately, these attempts failed and he missed the entire festival. The sheriff stated that the sculpture must be kept for ninety days so that its owner had time to claim it. With no one coming forward as his owner, finally, he was released to Denise Kowal after the ninety-day period had elapsed. Ego Leonard stayed in Sarasota at historic Burns Square until July 2012, when he "swam" to Los Angeles, California where he was invited to show his artwork.

Another 3D installation created at the festival was a 30' x 60' opera set by the Baltimore artist, Michael Kirby. The piece was a mix of 3D art painting and real props and it was created for a performance of Madame Butterfly by the Sarasota Opera. This undertaking was the first of its kind.

Among the many 3D installations at the festival others included, a 30' x 60' piece entitled Avatar by German artist Gregor Wosik, a 15' x 20' piece depicting mermaids by USA artist Melanie Stimmell, a 15' x 15' piece entitled Four Continents by USA artist Julie Kirk-Purcell, a 15' x 30' circus piece by Spanish artist Eduardo Relero, a 15' x 20' piece entitled Books by Brazilian artist Eduardo Kobra, a 30' x 40' piece entitled Augmented Realty by USA artists Art for After Hours, a 12' x 24' piece entitled Pirate Ship by USA artists Wayne and Cheryl Renshaw, and a 15' x 30' piece entitled Skatepark by USA artist Rod Tryon.

Cellograff

The 2011 festival introduced Cellograff to the United States. It is a form of graffiti executed on cellophane wrapped between poles. More than five of these temporary installations were created by iKanoGrafik.

Going Vertical

The 2011 Sarasota Chalk Festival also added Going Vertical as an additional feature of the festival and invited graffiti artists and muralists from around the world to participate. French artist MTO from Berlin, Kanos, Astros, and Katre from France, ChorBoggie and Max Ehrman from California, Eduardo Kobra from Brazil, A mural depicting a historic scene of the busy downtown in Sarasota at the turn of the twentieth century was created by Eduardo Kobra that covered the entire eastern side of a prominent building in Burns Square. It has become the background for photographs of the main events and primary drawings of each succeeding festival. Anat Ronan, Sunny Miller from Lafayette, Indiana, Dutch artist Remko Van Schaik, and many regional artists including Truman Adams completed works in different areas of the city. The artists were assigned to create murals on the walls of several buildings selected in the city, including both private and public properties, but visually accessible to the public. The pieces were created in cooperation with the artists, the city, and the property owners.

Following the festival, on November 30, the architect and the city held a reception atop its dramatic new parking garage on Palm Avenue to celebrate the murals that had been painted on each of its five floors as part of Going Vertical. Each floor has a unique mural celebrating the arts in Sarasota, representing dance, film, music, opera, and theatre. The garage murals were funded through a public art fund that is created with donations required of the developers of new buildings in the city who do not provide public art for their project.

=== — 2012 — Circus City USA ===
In January 2012 the dates of that year's annual event were announced on the festival's web site as, October 28 through November 6, and the theme, Circus City, USA, was declared. The theme of the festival was chosen to celebrate the 1920s in Sarasota, when the city became the winter home of the Ringling Brothers and Barnum and Bailey Circus.

Throughout the year announcements of celebrity artists and performers who would be featured included Sarasota resident and tight rope walker Nik Wallenda, 3D pavement art innovator Kurt Wenner, Ego Army artist Leon Keer, and Sword-swallower Johnny Fox. Performers from Circus Sarasota, Sailor Circus, Big Cat Habitat, and Fuzion Dance were scheduled to participate. The 2012 festival also would feature international acrobats and performers alongside the artworks and two life-size sculptures of Indian elephants, as well as two performance stages and a music stage.

A publisher of several local newspapers created a free, forty-page guide to the ten-day festival (right) that provided a map of the 2012 festival, a timeline for its events, articles featuring most of the special events, documentation of donors and volunteers, as well as a history of the festival and the street art it presents. This free publication was made available in the Sarasota Observer, at many local stores and venues throughout the county, at the offices of the festival, and it was handed to attendees as they entered the festival gates as well as at refreshment and souvenir sales booths among the artworks on the street. The Observer is a newspaper that is distributed for free at newsstands, museums, libraries, government offices, stores, and sidewalk literature boxes in neighborhoods throughout the county.

International coverage of the 2012 festival began with the start of the three-dimensional artwork and this news report, Chalk street art festival heads to Florida, discusses the Kurt Wenner piece extensively. Numerous videos about the 2012 chalk festival, have been released in the United States and various native countries of the artists, as well as by fans and producers of similar festivals.

Ego Leonard, who appeared on a Sarasota beach in 2011 and became ranked as the Number 2 oddball story of the year 2011 according to Time, was featured at the festival. He missed last year during his protective custody "incarceration" by the Sarasota county sheriff.

Snowflake and Surus, two life-sized sculptures of Indian elephants, were created to mark the entrances to the festival. They quickly became a favorite of the crowds. After the close of the festival, they were retained on the private property of the founder of the festival, at her historic building that was built by Owen Burns at the point defining the Burns Square section of town that hosts the festival each year. The elephant pair took on a life of their own, becoming a community favorite for photographs and regular visits. When removed for restoration before being integrated into the 2013 festival, they became a topic of concern, until reassurances that they would return were published.

Going Vertical also accompanied the festival in 2012 for a second season with Pixel Pancho, Entes y Pesimo, MTO, and many more national and international street artists participating. Many dramatic and colorful murals were created and under the leadership of its manager, Kafi Benz, the project expanded to include a mural in Manatee County. The final mural of the 2012 project, Go, Go, Denise, Go!, was painted in December by MTO and featured an image of the chalk festival director as a boxer, presumably in response to the skirmishes in which she acted to defend the street artists when a few people criticized the cutting-edge-street-art nature of some of the artwork, and about which MTO produced a documentary movie, FL: unpremeditated movie, that was released in March 2013.

The festival and the murals received accolades in the community and planning for the 2013 season began quickly in January with conferences with city officials about early approvals for essential logistical details for the event scheduled for mid-November.

=== — 2013 — Legacy of valor ===
Honoring veterans for the 2013 Chalk Festival was suggested by its official photographer since 2011 and a veteran of the Vietnam War, David Taylor. Choosing the suggestion enabled the festival to receive a sponsorship by the Patterson Foundation, which donated extensive additions to the Sarasota National Cemetery and kicked off its celebrations leading up to the opening of the planned amphitheater. Partnering with the foundation resulted in the adoption of its theme, Legacy of Valor: honoring veterans, inspiring patriotism, and embracing freedom and planning on the adaptation to events scheduled for the festival began. The poster for 2013 (right) carries the festival theme to a universal level, emphasizing the "heart" felt by veterans, support personnel, and citizens alike in a legacy of valor.

More than 500 artists and thousands of people participated in the event embracing the theme as the festival began on November 13 and lasted six days through November 18.

The festival announced in July that it would expand significantly farther to the north for 2013, doubling its area, and the Sarasota Observer provided a map with a diagram of the new areas of Pineapple Avenue that would host portions of the event. The event extended across Main Street in the heart of downtown, past Five Points Park, to First Street. The southerly boundary of the festival remained in Burns Square where South Pineapple Avenue converges with South Orange Avenue.

Sculpture was featured at the festival again, but in a grander scale. A minimalist sculpture garden based on the Sarasota National Cemetery was featured prominently at one section of the festival, taking up an entire block that to emphasize the solemnity of the sacrifice fallen veterans made for their country. The garden consisted of headstones and memorial features. Participation by festival goers was planned to honor veterans known or related to them as well as to all working to defend the country throughout its existence, including Rosie the Riveter! Ceremonies in the garden were held throughout each day, ending with "Taps" at dusk.

In August the festival responded to the extensive concern in the community about the two elephant sculptures being removed from Burns Square by explaining that they would return and be integrated into the 2013 festival.

In September the festival organization made an announcement that a curated exhibition of studio artworks by major artists participating in the chalk festival and Going Vertical, Reimagining the Sarasota Chalk Festival Artists, was planned. Although recognized as street artists, their studio works also hang in museums around the world. Some of these studio works were featured and available for sale during the chalk festival as the premier exhibit on tenth street of the Ice House. The VIP premier opening event was November 12, 2013 and the closing event of the festival November 17, 2013. Shortly after the close of the exhibit, many of these paintings became featured at the Sarasota Chalk Festival gift shop and gallery, opened at 529 South Pineapple Avenue. The shop is connected to the festival office at 530 South Orange Avenue via a passage through the historic building and it will remain open throughout the year.

During the first week of November the Sarasota Observer published a complete guide to the 2013 festival and distributed it within its weekly paper edition. This was the second year the free publication issued a guide to the festival. It featured a map of the festival events and their locations as well as articles on many aspects of the festival. Distribution at the festival and to many outlets in the city made the guide available to visitors.

The November 22, 2013 Sarasota News Leader published a nine-page spread of images from the festival and the publication also featured one of the drawings, portraying John F. Kennedy, on its cover.

Going Vertical projects and associated chalk festival events occurred throughout the year. The first mural painted for the 2013 festival season, however, appeared during the end of October on the long, western wall of the Ice House. The mural was painted by JBAK, which is the team of James Bullough and Addison Karl. They are known internationally for combining the vastly different styles into one painting. The final mural of the season, "Road Trip 2" by MTO, was painted on the northern wall of The Players Theatre. It was completed on November 27.

=== — 2014 — Extinct and Endangered Species ===
The 2014 festival moved to Venice, Florida after six seasons in Sarasota, Florida, USA. The founder, Denise Kowal, organized artists from around the world to create a Guinness World Record for the Largest Anamorphic (3d) Pavement Art in the world. Kurt Wenner, the innovator of the 3d pavement art form created the design composed of 11 square sectors, each sector was 42 feet on a side and composed of 14 tiles- three feet square each. This makes a total footage of 19,404 square feet. Wenner wrote Kowal, "As I was composing the work I became very aware of the implications of the size. It is really an almost impossible task. A single extra row of plain (unbroken) tiles painted around the work would put this size over 22,000 square feet." The artists led by Julie Kirk-Purcell, one of the first female pioneers of the art form, finished the piece in 11 days with one rain day. Artists even added fossils in the rocks and signed their names to make the 1/4 mile walk around the painting interesting to viewers. The final measurements was measured at 22,747.6 square feet by Strayer Survey & Mapping in accordance with the National Surveying Standards meeting the accuracy standards required for the record.

In February 2015 Guinness World Records, the global authority on record-breaking achievements, announced that the Sarasota Chalk Festival, a 501c3 nonprofit cultural arts organization, secured the title for the 'Largest Anamorphic Pavement Art' in the world during the November 2014 Chalk Festival in Venice, Florida, U.S.A. Anamorphic (3D) pavement art that involves tricking the brain into seeing something rise above or sink below a flat surface was invented by KURT WENNER in 1982 by combining traditional street painting with his classical training and understanding of illusion.

Artists traveled from all over the world to participate, including past record holders, Remko van Schaik from the Netherlands, Marion Ruthardt, Gregor Wosik and Lydia Hitzfeld from Germany. Other notable pavement artists included Matthew May from the Netherlands, Roberto Carlos Treviño Rodriguez, Carlosalberto Gh, Adry del Rocío and Ruben Arriaga from Mexico, Frederike Fredda Wouters from Germany, Tomoteru ToMo Saito from Japan, Alex Maksiov from Ukraine, JM Navello from France, Vera Bugatti, Ketty Grossi, Luigi Legno, Tony Cuboliquido and FabioFedele ItalianStreetpainting from Italy, Philippenzo Madonnaro, Darya Sharova and Victorio Puzzini from Russia, Sergio Nino from Columbia, Sharyn Chan Namnath, Genna Panzarella, Lori A. Escalera, Lorelle Miller from California, Cathy Gallatin and Mera Oliveria from Oregon, Anat Ronen from Texas, Kitty K Dyble Thompson from Wisconsin, Craig Thomas from Missouri, David Brancato, Jane Durandj, Ilona Fries, Julie Graden, Jamie Sealander, Janet Tombros, Michele Rayner-Altenbernd and Michele Michelle Clinton from Florida. The attempt was made possible because of hundreds of people that included the support of all the artists, volunteers, visitors and major sponsors such as the City of Venice, Fairfield Inn & Suites of Venice, Sharky's On The Pier, Suncoast Air Center, Safway Scaffolding, Sherwin Williams Paint, Pro Paint, Venice Fire Department, LandShark Lager, Venice Gondolier Sun, Clothesline Tees and Kenyon Kowal.

=== — 2019 — Museum in Motion ===
On April 5–7, 2019 the chalk festival returned to Burns Square Historic District in downtown Sarasota. This special date for a festival was created to take the place of the November 2018 festival that was cancelled due to a red tide event in southwest Florida involving the Gulf of Mexico and the bays along Sarasota County.
