= Avenida de Colores =

Producer of the Sarasota Chalk Festival

Avenida de Colores, Inc. was founded in 2010 by Denise Kowal as a 501(c)(3) nonprofit corporation, based in Sarasota, Florida in the United States. The corporation produced the Sarasota Chalk Festival, a cultural event designed to celebrate the sixteenth century performance art of Italian street painting.

== First international street painting festival in the U.S. ==
In 2010, Avenida de Colores coordinated the first international street painting festival in the United States, called the Sarasota Chalk Festival. The festival had notable Guinness World Record holders Edgar Mueller from Germany, Leon Keer from the Netherlands, and Tracy Lee Stum from the USA. Genna Panzarella, the first woman to receive Italy's honorable Maestra Madonnari title at the International Grazi di Curtatone competition, participated as well as Vera Bugatti, who also holds the Maestra Madonnari title. Maestro Madonnaro Edgar Mueller created a 100' x 40' 3D street painting that is the first known contemporary street painting that metamorphosed from one image to another with the change from day to night because the painter used photoluminescent paints. The Sarasota Chalk Festival was also the first street painting festival to have a Halloween theme for the artist's work as well as three oversized 3-D installations, one of which incorporated a two-point perspective.

== Sarasota Chalk Festival History ==
As president of the Burns Square Property Owners Association, Inc., in 2007, Kowal founded a nonprofit corporation, the Avenida de Colores Chalk Festival, a street painting festival held on South Pineapple Avenue in the downtown Sarasota historic area known as Burns Square. Only twenty-two artists participated in this first festival. Lori Escalera, a leading modern Madonnari from the USA was the only professional street painter who participated.

In 2009, the second Avenida de Colores Chalk Festival was held with approximately one hundred street painters participating, who were from across the USA, and more than two hundred local stage performers.

In 2010, the Burns Square Property Owners Association relinquished the Avenida de Colores Chalk Festival to the Avenida de Colores corporation. The street painting festival was renamed the Sarasota Chalk Festival.

The festival has since been relocated to Venice (also in Sarasota County).
