= Melanie Stimmell =

American artist

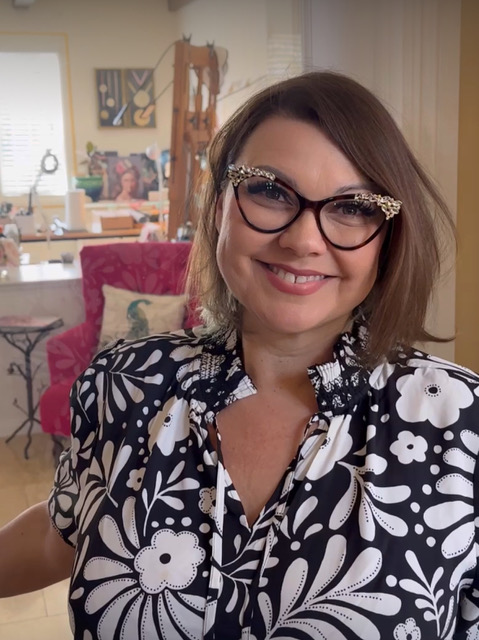
- Melanie Stimmell in 2024
- Born: 1975 (age 50–51); Los Angeles, California
- Education: ArtCenter College of Design
- Known for: Fine art, street painting, murals, 3D street art, fine art painting, chalk festivals, whimsical art
- Website: melaniestimmell.com

Melanie Stimmell Van Latum, born 1975 in Los Angeles, is an international 3D street painter and fine artist specializing in large scale chalk art and Renaissance-style inspired imagery.

A Signature member of the Pastel Society of America, she began street painting in 1998 and has painted at festivals throughout the United States and internationally. Melanie Stimmell works with clients in Turkey, the Netherlands, Canada, France, Thailand, Israel, The Republic of Georgia, China, The Netherlands Antilles, and throughout the US. Commissioned by corporations and advertising agencies for special events, performance art and interactive media which includes TV, film, and print, Stimmell's street paintings convey the spirit of creativity, art, and culture.

== Career ==
Melanie Stimmell Van Latum is a graduate of Art Center College of Design with a degree in Illustration and was she was trained as an oil painter and digital media artist. After graduating she worked as a lead technical director for the feature film South Park: Bigger, Longer & Uncut and then for the South Park TV series for 8 years. She made her Park West debut during the gallery's New Year's Weekend auctions. 12 original paintings by Stimmell were featured, and all 12 sold out during the weekend’s auction events. An additional three paintings in progress were also sold during the event.

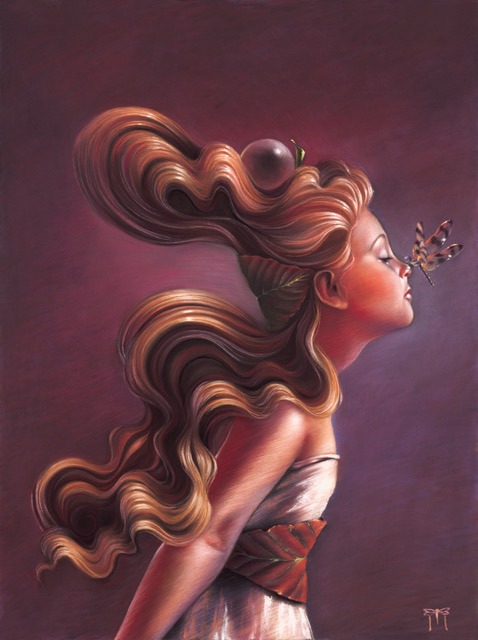
The Messenger by Melanie Stimmell.

During the auctions, two new graphic works were introduced: "The Countess Ova Rose" sold 48 times, and "The Messenger" sold over 120 times, setting a gallery record for single-day sales of a single image.

In 2024, Stimmell collaborated with fellow Park West Gallery artist Kat Tatz on a new project that blended their distinct artistic styles. Stimmell stated that the collaboration led her to explore different artistic methods, a sentiment supported by Tatz. The project resulted in pieces designed to focus on collaborative visual themes.

=== Fine Art ===
Stimmell is a fine artist who creates works in soft pastels and oils, exhibiting primarily through Park West Galleries. Her work frequently features subjects centered on the feminine form combined with elements of nature, animals, and stylized hair designs. In 2021, Stimmell and her team (We Talk Chalk) created the murals in the domed ceiling of the new Grand Entrance in Caesar’s Palace in Las Vegas.

Stimmell is also a fine artist creating works in soft pastels and oils that she shows in Southern California galleries under her married name, Melanie Van Latum. Stimmell has created street painting artwork and led workshops for eleven years for cultural and children's charity events around the world including Youth in arts, Children's Creative Project, Larimer Arts Association, Bakersfield Museum of Art Educational Programs, New Technology High School, Kayoo, Imadon Group, Visual Arts Scholastic Event, Les Craies d'Azur, and The Center for Hearing and Speech. She offers street painting workshops to children through the Orange County Performing Arts Center and the Los Angeles Music Center. She is currently teaching students from English classes at South Gate High School to street paint (Ms. Bell, Mr. DeLeon and Mr. Stelzreid's classes), and how to incorporate art into the core curriculum.

Stimmell has worked in conjunction with online Photoshop guru Mark Monciardini of Photoshop Top Secret to create Photoshop tutorials for photographers and artists.

In an interview, Stimmell discussed her artistic journey and philosophy.

=== Chalk art ===
In 1999, while at South Park, Stimmell began street painting for festivals in the United States including the I Madonnari Festival in Santa Barbara and the Sarasota Chalk Festival, America's first International chalk festival, in Sarasota, Florida. In 2006 she was commissioned to create the festival's 20th Anniversary featured painting at the steps of the Mission Santa Barbara. She was chosen as one of 3 American artists to paint in Istanbul, Turkey for their first street painting festival in 2004. Having painted for several cultural events in the Netherlands, Melanie returned in the summer of 2007 to work with an international group of street painters from Italy, Germany, and the Netherlands to paint a tribute to the churches and cathedrals of Utrecht. Stimmell's painting, 'The Entombment', was on display in the Augustinus church of Utrecht.

Stimmell is co-founder of 'We Talk Chalk', a company that offers solutions to event or marketing needs through the use of (3D) street painting and multimedia. Led by Melanie and Remco Van Latum, We Talk Chalk introduced the art of 3-D street painting to countries such as Israel, Thailand, Colombia, and The Republic of Georgia. The city of Chiang Mai hosted their first street painting festival in March 2012, with the help of Melanie, Remco, and 3 other We Talk Chalk artists. To celebrate the ninetieth anniversary of Tel Aviv suburb Ramat Hasharon, Israeli and 8 International artists from 'We Talk Chalk,' including Melanie, used 3-D chalk drawings to transform Bialik Street into an urban art compound. The festival had as many as 50,000 visitors, including Israel’s President Shimon Peres who posed with paintings by Melanie Stimmell and Ruben Poncia.

In August 2013, Stimmell and We Talk Chalk created the longest anamorphic painting in the world. The piece, commissioned by Smirnoff and developed in partnership with Index Creative Village and Nannapas Publisher Co., may be found in Asia’s famous Siam Center. Total length, an astounding 165 meters (543 feet). Total square footage measured just under 3,000.

In 2009, under Stimmell's artistic direction, Expressions in Chalk Street Painting Festival in London, Ontario, Canada, recreated the central ceiling of the Sistine Chapel at 18 x 92 feet. Stimmell also worked as a featured artist on the 2002 San Rafael Sistine Chapel Project. Since then, Stimmell has secured her Maestro status in Europe with her second win in the Netherlands and the highest honor a street painter is bestowed, Italy's Maestro Gold Medal in Grazie di Curtatone.

Stimmell returned to the prestigious "Meeting of the Madonnari" in Italy in 2024, joining over 100 artists to create interpretations of Dante's "Divine Comedy".

In 2024, she earned the Paradiso Maestro Bronze Medal at the 50th annual Meeting of the Madonnari in Italy.
