= Alexandre Renoir =

French impressionist painter, relative of Pierre-Auguste Renoir

Alexandre Renoir (born 1974) is a French-born artist who paints in a contemporary impressionist style. He is the great-grandson of Pierre-Auguste Renoir.

== Early life ==
Alexandre Renoir was born in Cagnes Sur Mer and moved to Canada at the age of four. His great-grandfather was French painter Pierre-Auguste Renoir.

== Artistic career ==
Renoir's paintings have been displayed in Park West Gallery, Ocean Galleries, the Museum of Fine Arts (St. Petersburg, Florida) and others, though he currently works through Park West Gallery.

In 2018, the Monthaven Arts and Cultural Center in Hendersonville, Tennessee hosted Beauty Remains, an exhibition of his works.
