= Kat Tatz =

American visual artist

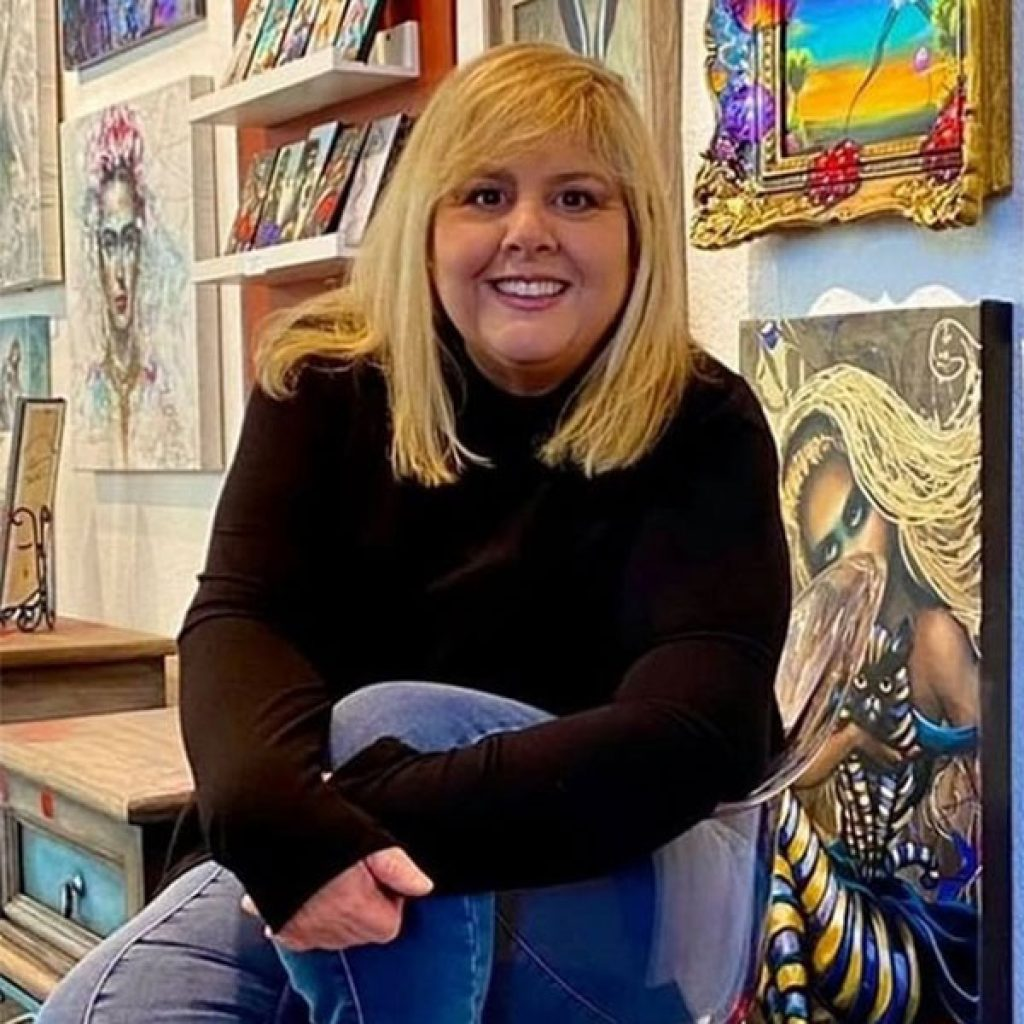
- Kat Tatz at Wonderland Gallery, 2022
- Born: Las Vegas, Nevada, U.S.

Kat Tatz is an American visual artist based in Las Vegas, Nevada. She is known for surrealist and whimsical artworks that combine anthropomorphic figures with ornate vintage frames. Her work often reflects themes of transformation and identity, influenced by the entertainment culture of Las Vegas.

== Early life and education ==
Tatz was raised in a family of artists. Her father and grandfather were painters and sculptors, and her mother made porcelain dolls. She moved to Las Vegas in 1966, and was exposed to the city's live entertainment scene during her youth, experiences that later shaped her visual style.

She studied at the University of Nevada, Las Vegas and participated in art workshops around the country. Her media include oil, acrylic, colored pencil, and mixed media sculpture. A distinguishing feature of her work is the use of antique or historic frames, often integrated into the artwork's narrative.

One of her earliest memories is drawing portraits at the kitchen table alongside her father, who also worked as a sign maker and woodworker. According to Tatz, some of his handcrafted birdhouses were later commissioned for Michael Jackson's Neverland Ranch.

== Career ==
Tatz was the winner of the inaugural Made in Vegas art competition hosted by Park West Gallery in 2021, selected from nearly 500 entries. Her work is exhibited through Park West Gallery's events and venues, including cruise ship auctions and gallery spaces in Las Vegas.

Prior to joining Park West Gallery, Tatz operated the Wonderland Gallery in the Las Vegas Arts District, where she exhibited her work locally and built a collector following. Her artwork has been featured on HGTV's "DIY to the Rescue" and exhibited in Laguna Beach, California, and at Art Space & Design in Canada.

In Las Vegas, her creations have been displayed at multiple locations, including the Grand Canal Shoppes at the Venetian, Tivoli Village, Mandalay Bay, Centennial Hills Hospital, and Allegiant Stadium. Her inclusion in Allegiant Stadium's art collection was curated by artist Michael Godard, the venue's art director.
