= Edgar Müller =

German painter

Edgar Müller (born 1968, Mülheim, Ruhr, Germany, often transliterated Mueller) is a 3D street artist,

== See also ==
- Kurt Wenner
- Leon Keer
