= Burns Square Historic District =

Mixed-use area, mostly commercial, in Sarasota, Florida

- U.S. National Register of Historic Places
- U.S. Historic district
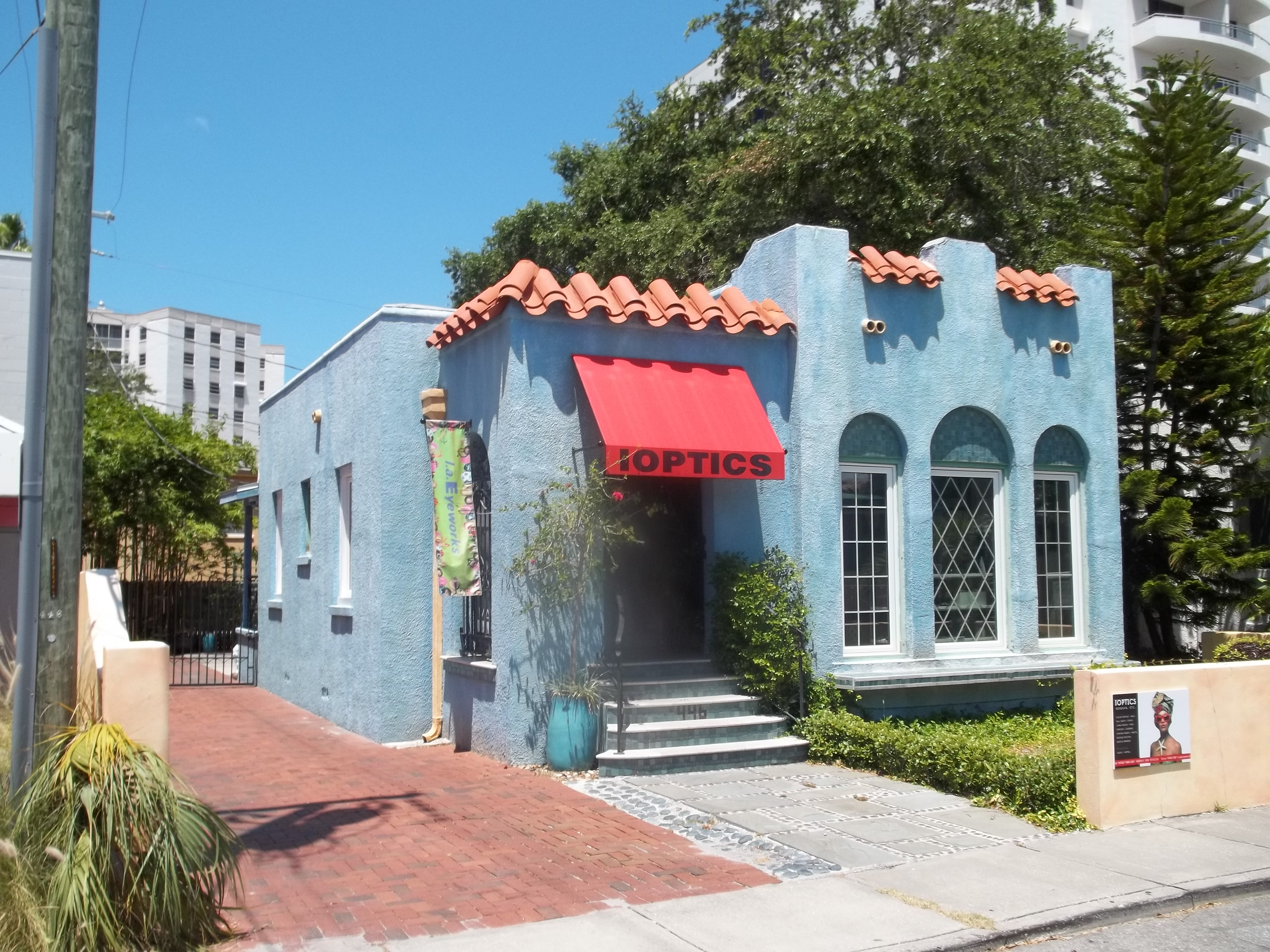

- Location within Florida
- Location: Sarasota, Florida
- Coordinates: 27°20′03″N 82°32′23″W
- Area: 20 acres (0.081 km^{2})
- MPS: Sarasota MRA
- NRHP reference No.: 84003830
- Added to NRHP: 22 March 1984

Burns Square Historic District is a historic district located in Sarasota, Florida, United States. The area runs from Ringling Boulevard to Mound Avenue along South Pineapple and South Orange Avenues. Burns Square is bound by Laurel Park Historic District to the east, Palm Avenue residential neighborhood to the west, and Hudson Bayou to the south.

== History ==
In 1925, Owen Burns developed and built the Burns Court subdivision in the area. Plans for it were designed by architect Thomas Reed Martin. The Burns Court Historic District was given historic designation by the National Park Service in 1984. The cottages of Burns Court subdivision were located at 400-446 Burns Court and 418, 426, and 446 South Pineapple Avenue. This historic street is located one to three blocks to the northwest of the triangular Pineapple Apartments site.

Between 1925 and 1929, the landscape of this district changed drastically. In 1925, the Sanborn Insurance Map of Sarasota showed no structures on the triangular property at South Orange and South Pineapple Avenues. Across the street on South Orange Avenue, the only structure was a single-family residence and its garage. The Seaboard Air Line Railway went from Lemon Avenue down Pineapple, and by 1929, the neighborhood was developed. In its edition of December 15, 1926, the Herald Tribune showed photographs of its new business home that opened on October 4, 1925, complete with advertising and business offices, a press room, and linotype and composing rooms. Also, a two-page segment ran with the headline, "The Ringling-Burns Interests Have Shown Their Faith". In addition to photographs of the El Vernona Hotel, The Broadway Apartments, and The Colson Hotel for "the colored population and colored tourists". The surrounding area became known as Herald Square after the Sarasota Herald building was completed by Owen Burns across Orange Avenue that same year.

Owen Burns built the triangular Pineapple Apartments at a cost of $75,000. The building sits between the most southerly point of Pineapple Avenue where it intersects with Orange Avenue. The design for the building began in the New York offices of architect Dwight James Baum. In 1924, Baum discovered Sarasota and, after meeting Owen Burns, determined that he wanted to recreate the architecture he had seen in Europe and the Mediterranean. The building had seven apartments on the second floor. Stores occupied the first floor, including Tee Gee, a five-and-dime type shop, and Freeman's Drugs, a drugstore operated by Clarence and Nellie Freeman.

In 1950, Paul Rudolph, from the Sarasota School of Architecture, designed a modern addition to the triangular Burns building. The Rudolph addition increased the number of one-bedroom apartments to 18, with additional retail space on the ground floor. The 1960 City Directory reflects that by this time the Sarasota Herald-Tribune had moved to 801 South Tamiami Trail and Privett's Drugs was located at 1605 Third Street with a new owner.

In 1986, Denise Kowal bought the triangular building and its 1950s addition to save them from demolition by speculators who wanted to build a high-rise on the property. She made extensive interior and exterior renovations. A cupola, wrought iron balconies, awnings, and tile address signs were also added. Three of the original studio apartments were converted to a single apartment that Kowal occupied with her two sons in 1996. In 1997, the residence was featured in the Sarasota Alliance for Historic Preservation annual Historic Homes Tour. Later, she restored the Burns building, removing many of the new features she had added. In April 2025, Kowal was awarded a 2025 Sarasota County Heritage Award at a presentation by the Sarasota Alliance for Historic Preservation that recognized her recent restoration of the building as an outstanding contribution to the preservation and understanding of the resources of the community.

In 1999, the area was renamed to "Burns Square Historic District" by the area stakeholders, replacing Herald Square, as an honor to Owen Burns and the history of this triangularly shaped district.

== See also ==
- LaHurd, Jeff (2006). "IV, Setting the Stage". Sarasota: A History. Charleston, S.C.: History Press. p. 221. ISBN 978-1-59629-119-5.
- LaHurd, Jeff (2005). Gulf Coast Chronicles: Remembering Sarasota's Past. Charleston, S.C.: History Press. ISBN 1-59629-029-3.
- Owen Burns, Sarasota History Alive!, video linked to March 14, 2012 edition
