= Via Colori =

Via Colori is a street painting festival held in several cities in the United States to raise funds for not-for-profit organizations. Hundreds of artists, usually sponsored by a business or individual, gather and create large-scale artworks on the street using chalk. After expenses, the money raised goes to the not-for-profit organization to help further its mission.

== History ==
Street painting was first recorded in Italy in the 16th century when artists would paint religious icons in the courtyards of cathedrals. Known as "madonnari", these artists were "the visual arts counterpart of minstrels" and would most commonly paint icons of the Madonna. Street painting festivals are now held throughout the world.

In 1994, Via Colori was founded by author, playwright, and performer Rick Compton in Naples, Florida. Via Colori is owned, supported, and licensed by Compton and is licensable by any not-for-profit with a widely supported mission.

== Festivals ==
According to Via Colori's website, "more than 100 Via Coloris have been held in 14 cities." Cities that have previously hosted a Via Colori festival include Fredericksburg, Virginia; Elizabethtown, Kentucky; Harrisburg, Pennsylvania; Glendale, Arizona; Sandestin, Florida; and Houston, Texas. They are hosted by "beneficiary hosts", 501(c)(3) organizations that license Via Colori and coordinate the festival to further its mission.

== Artists ==
One artist is featured amongst the volunteer artists who draw in each Via Colori. They are typically well-known in the field and usually create a larger square artwork.

Artists may be full-time professional artists, "talented hobbyists," or "art enthusiasts." Occasionally squares will be painted together, such as in a family or school group.
