= Park West Gallery =

Commercial art gallery in Michigan, United States

Coordinates: 42.50378°N 83.31532°W

- Type: Private
- Founded: 1969; 57 years ago
- Founder: Albert Scaglione
- Headquarters: Southfield, Michigan, U.S.
- Website: www.parkwestgallery.com

Park West Gallery is a commercial art gallery based in Southfield, Michigan, United States. Park West Gallery claims to be the largest private art gallery in the world, but that is largely disputed, and that it has sold hundreds of works of art for thousands of dollars. Park West specializes in mass-produced reproductions of original paintings. It exhibits work from historic artists such as Renoir, Picasso, Rembrandt, and Durer as well as contemporary artists such as Peter Max, Michael Godard, Melanie Stimmell, and Mark Kostabi. The gallery derives the majority of its revenue from auctions that take place aboard cruise ships. The company's sales tactics have led to several lawsuits and media investigations.

== History ==
In 1969, Albert Scaglione opened Park West Gallery in Southfield, Michigan, after being a Wayne State University teacher of mechanical engineering. Park West Gallery has a large facility in Oakland County, Michigan and offices in South Florida from which the company processes a high volume of art.

Since 1993, Park West Gallery has been conducting fine art auctions aboard cruise ships, and is the largest business in this field. It has sold art on: Carnival, Celebrity Cruises, Disney Cruise Line, Holland America Line, Norwegian Cruise Line, Oceania Cruises, and Royal Caribbean International. Park West claims that it is "the world's largest art dealer" based on its volume of sales, though independent analysts dispute that claim. It uses various techniques for its mass-produced reproductions, such as giclée prints and—using a trade term coined by Park West Gallery—"seriolithograph" described as a "combination of the two print making processes — serigraphy and lithography."

Park West Gallery does not reveal financial reports, as it is privately owned, but it has reported selling nearly 300,000 artworks a year with a revenue in excess of $300 million. Half of its revenue comes from 85 auctioneers on cruise-ships, and the rest of the revenue is from promotions in hotels and sales in its gallery. It funds the philanthropic Park West Foundation.

=== Locations ===
Park West Gallery is headquartered in Southfield, Michigan. The 63,000-square-foot flagship location holds 23 individual exhibition spaces. Alongside contemporary and historic artwork, Park West's collection also sports memorabilia, and rare production cels.

In 2021, Park West expanded its locations to include gallery spaces in Las Vegas, Nevada in January 2021, and in Waikiki, Honolulu, Hawaii on the Beach Walk. The Las Vegas location is housed inside the Forum Shops at Caesars Palace hotel and casino.

In December 2022, Park West opened an additional location in New York City's SoHo arts district. For the grand opening, guests included Walter Robinson, Carlo McCormick, and Madeline Follin of the indie rock band Cults.

Their fulfillment center is based in Miami Lakes, Florida. This facility handles the gallery's framing, International shipping, art transport, and houses executive offices.

=== Philanthropy ===
Park West launched its philanthropic organization, The Park West Foundation, in 2006, which provides assistance for youth aging out of the Foster Care system in southeast Michigan. The foundation helps with housing, employment, tuition aid and scholarships, transportation, clothing, and more. The Gallery has been involved in charitable giving as well. In 2022, Park West Gallery hosted an auction telecast that raised over $500,000 for the Ukrainian Red Cross Society.

== Cruise auction disputes ==
In 2008, complaints were reported by The New York Times and other media about the conduct of auctions, and a class action lawsuit has been filed concerning the valuation of items sold. The company has dismissed these complaints as unfounded. One buyer said he later discovered that a Picasso print which he had been advised by Park West was a "good investment" at $35,000 (he won it for $24,265) had been sold at Sotheby's two years previously for $6,150. USA Today and other media carried similar reports. In July 2008, The New York Times published an article citing complaints by six individuals, concerning sales tactics, certification and valuation of work, and money-back promises. Some refunds have been made to customers with a confidentiality clause. Scaglione said the gallery had spent "hundred of thousands of dollars" on establishing valuations through independent consultants. Most of all claims against the gallery had been settled or dismissed.

In April 2008, a Florida and a California resident filed class action lawsuits, accusing Park West of misrepresenting the value of artwork. In September 2008, the gallery instituted a policy where any item bought from them could be returned for a refund (less the buyer's premium) or exchanged for another artwork within specified timeframes.

Royal Caribbean announced in May 2010 it would not renew its concession contract with Park West, after more than 15 years of partnership. However, the agreement was renewed and Park West currently operates on Royal Caribbean ships.

In December 2014, the Michigan Court of Appeals reinstated a lawsuit filed by a woman who claims she bought $165,000 in faked Salvador Dalí artwork that had been overturned by a lower court decision in 2012 over a technicality.
