= Sanctuary of the Beata Vergine delle Grazie, Curtatone =

Church in Province of Mantua

Coordinates: 45.15729°N 10.69456°E

Santuario delle Beate Vergine delle Grazie
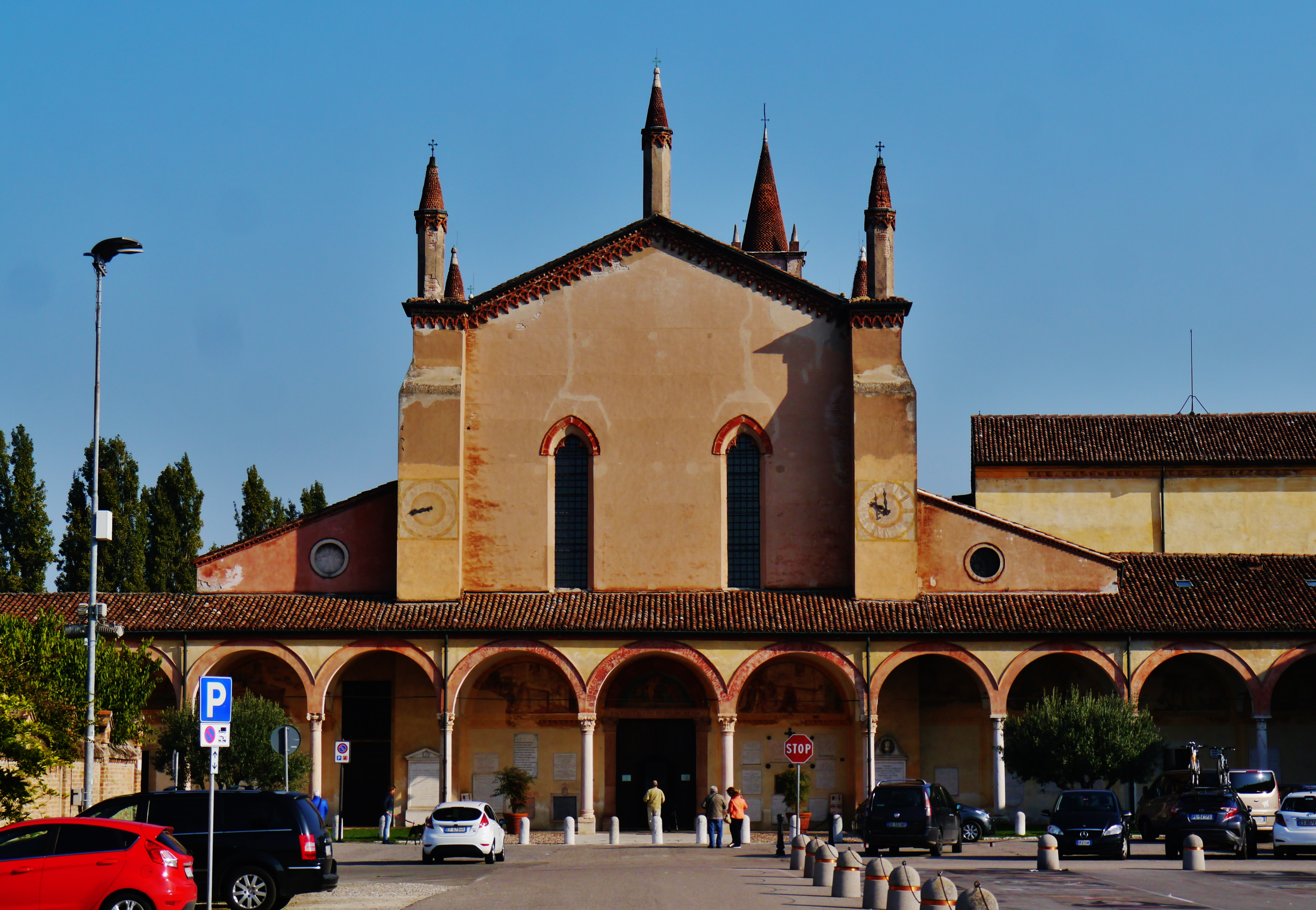
- Facade of the Sanctuary

Religion
- Affiliation: Roman Catholic
- Festival: Feria delle Grazie

Location
- Location: Piazzale Santuario, Grazie
- Municipality: Curtatone
- State: Italy
- Country: Mantua
- Interactive map of Santuario delle Beate Vergine delle Grazie
- Administration: Diocese of Mantua

Architecture
- Type: Church
- Direction of façade: South

Santuario delle Beate Vergine delle Grazie (Sanctuary of the Blessed Virgin of the Graces) is a Roman Catholic church located in the hamlet of Grazie, a neighborhood of the town of Curtatone, province of Mantua, region of Lombardy, Italy.

== History ==
The sanctuary is located just south of the river Mincio, as it enters the lago Superiore of Mantua. An icon of the Virgin housed in a road-side aedicule had become a goal of local pilgrims. This led the church and locals to erect a sanctuary and Franciscan convent at the site in 1399; in 1406, to thank the virgin for stemming the plague that had assaulted the city, Francesco I Gonzaga, captain of Mantua, commissioned erection of the present basilica church with designs attributed to the architect to the Mantuan court, Bartolino da Novara. Previously, a portico encircled the entire plaza in front of the church. Under the occupation of Lombardy by Napoleonic forces, the convent was suppressed and much of it was torn down. The convent was restored to the Franciscan order, then to the Passionist order, and since the mid-20th century is associated with the diocese of Mantua.

The facade is simple and made in brick with a large portico sheltering frescoed lunettes. The interior has Gothic tracery and notable for the decorated side niches designed in 1517 by the monk Francesco da Acquanegra. The decorations are peculiar for a church, in that all along the walls the niches shelter individual statues donated by those who claim their prayers to the virgin were answered, including persons depicted facing various forms of capital punishment. Finally high above the entrance is a hoisted taxidermied crocodile.

The first chapel on the right, holds the mausoleum of the statesman and author Baldassarre Castiglione (1478–1529). The capel was designed by Giulio Romano. The sanctuary also once housed a collection of armor, now in the Museo Diocesano di Mantova.

The church was also near the site of the Battle of Curtatone and Montanara on 29 May 1848, where raw Tuscan and Neapolitan volunteers engaged the Austrian forces under General Josef Radetzky during the First Italian War of Independence. The Italians, in a long skirmish, were defeated and forced to retreat. On the facade, various plaques recall events from the Italian persepective.

A plaque installed by the general Cesare de Laugier, who led the Tuscan contingent, blames their defeat on lack of support, and finds some sense of victory in that his troops were not pursued further after the Austrian victory. He had a plaque written:

Glorious Italian memory. In these fields of Curtatone and Montanara on May 29, 1848, the Austrian Marshal Radetzky attacked with his powerful army a handful of young Tuscans completely deprived of any support, resisted for seven hours and finally, exhausted of ammunition, surrendered in Goito and Castellucchio. The enemies did not dare to pursue them and of the Tuscans their fellow citizen General de Laugier, blessing and memory to the martyrs of patriotic love.

A plaque by Napoleone Sforsi dedicated to two of his brothers, Temistocle e Aristide, from Livorno who died at the bridge of Osone, laments that the King Charles Albert of Sardinia, was unable enter the church and evacuate the wounded therein during his retreat, blaming the locals who feared the Austrian army.

In August 14–15, the square in front of the church is used for chalk decorations during the Fiera delle Grazie.

== Gallery ==
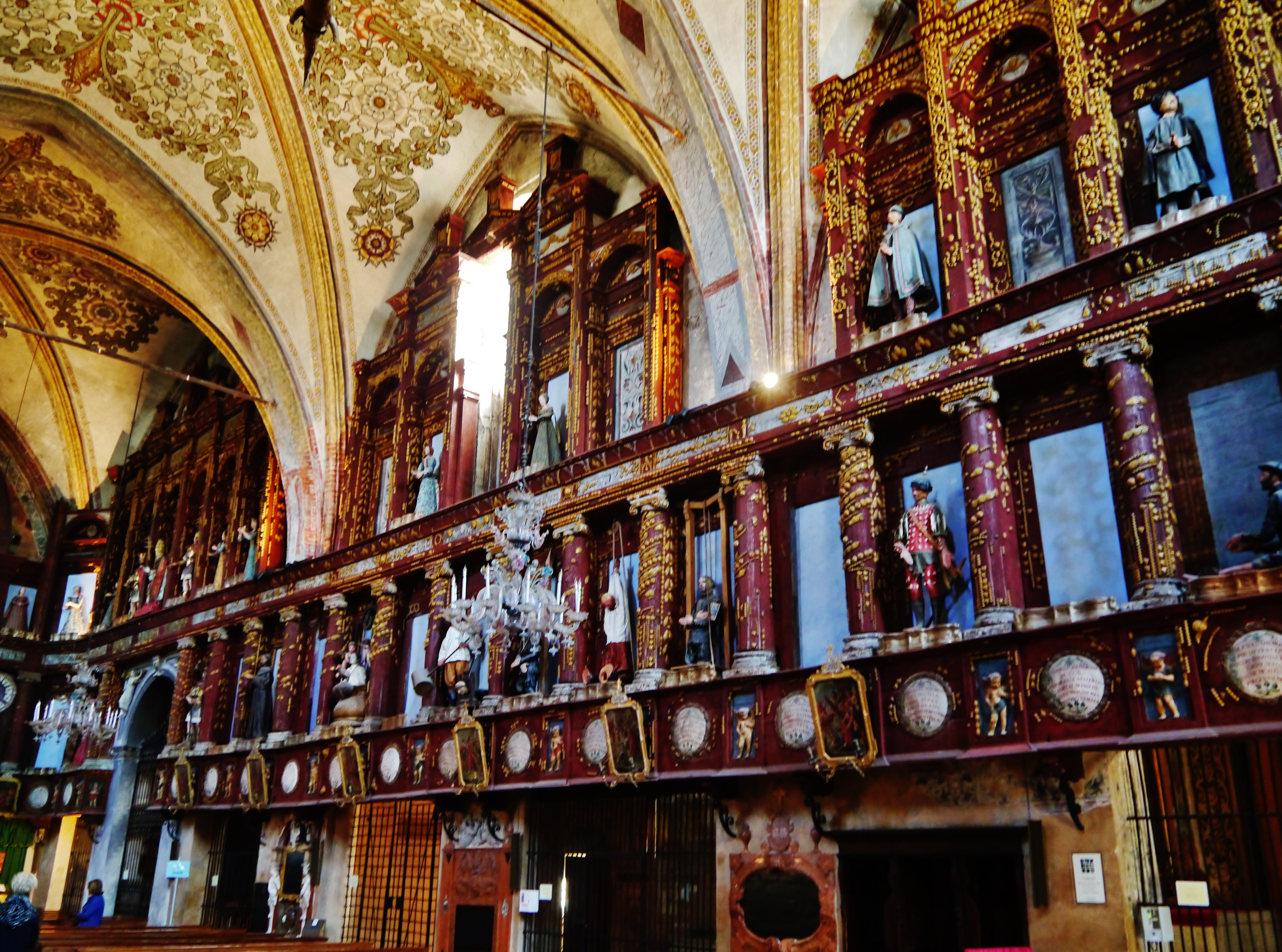
Flanking walls

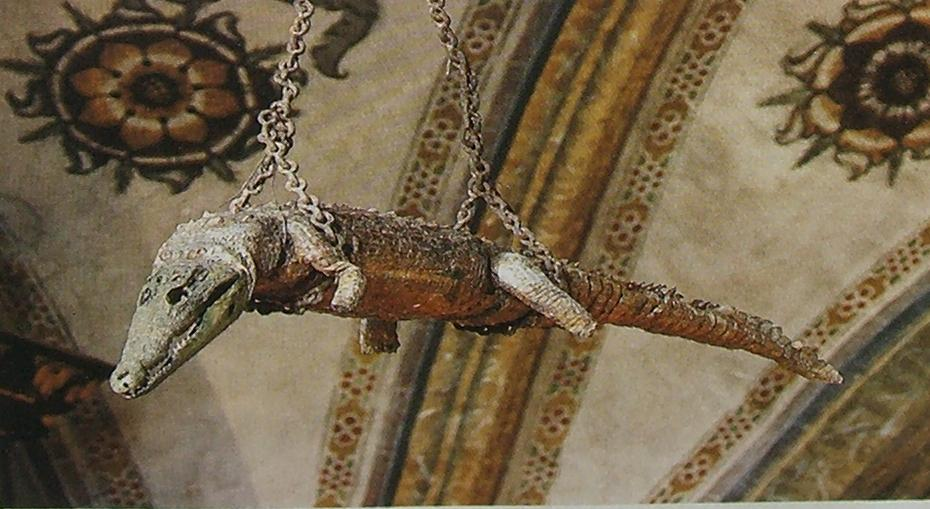
Crocodile

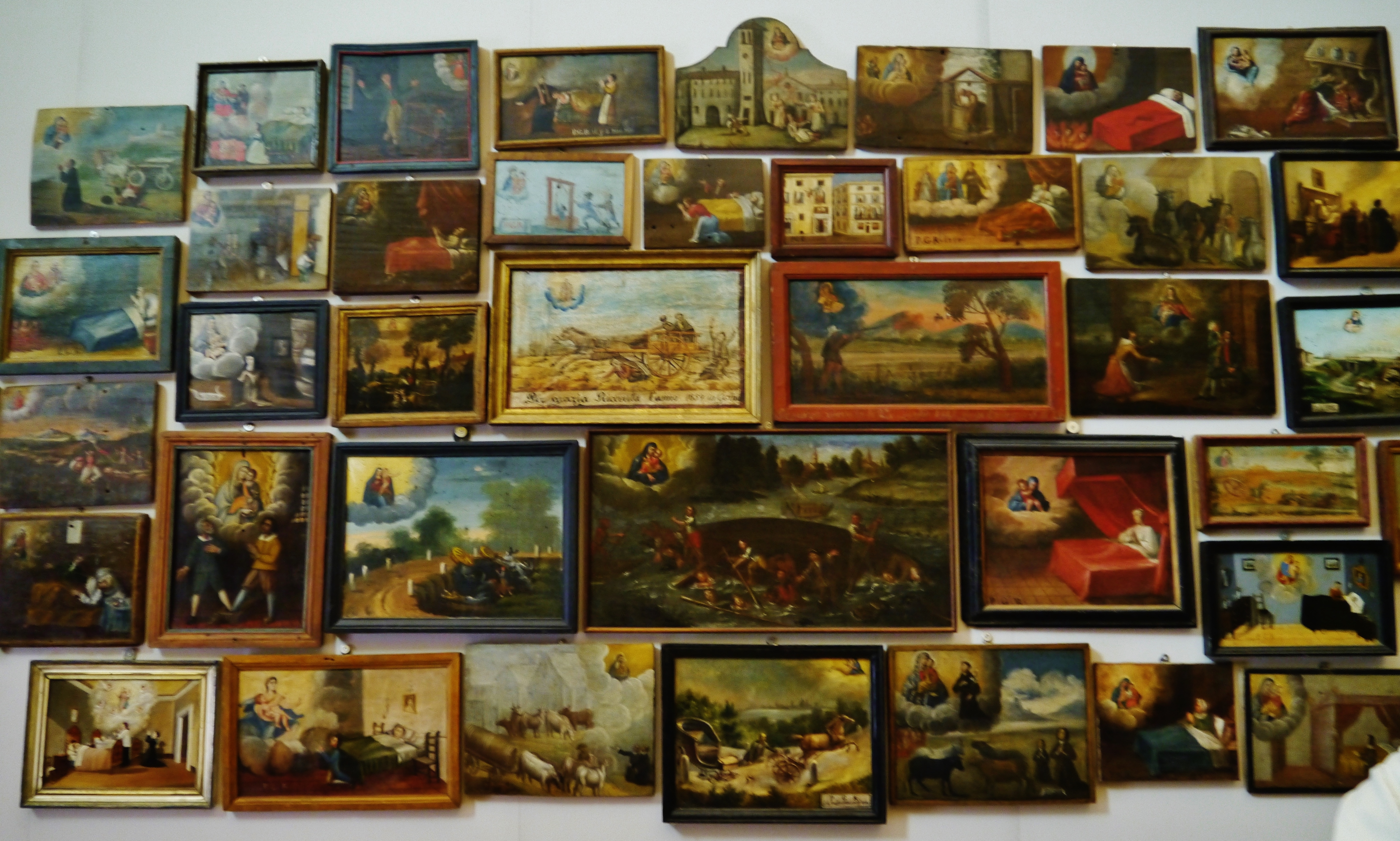
Ex Votos in chapel

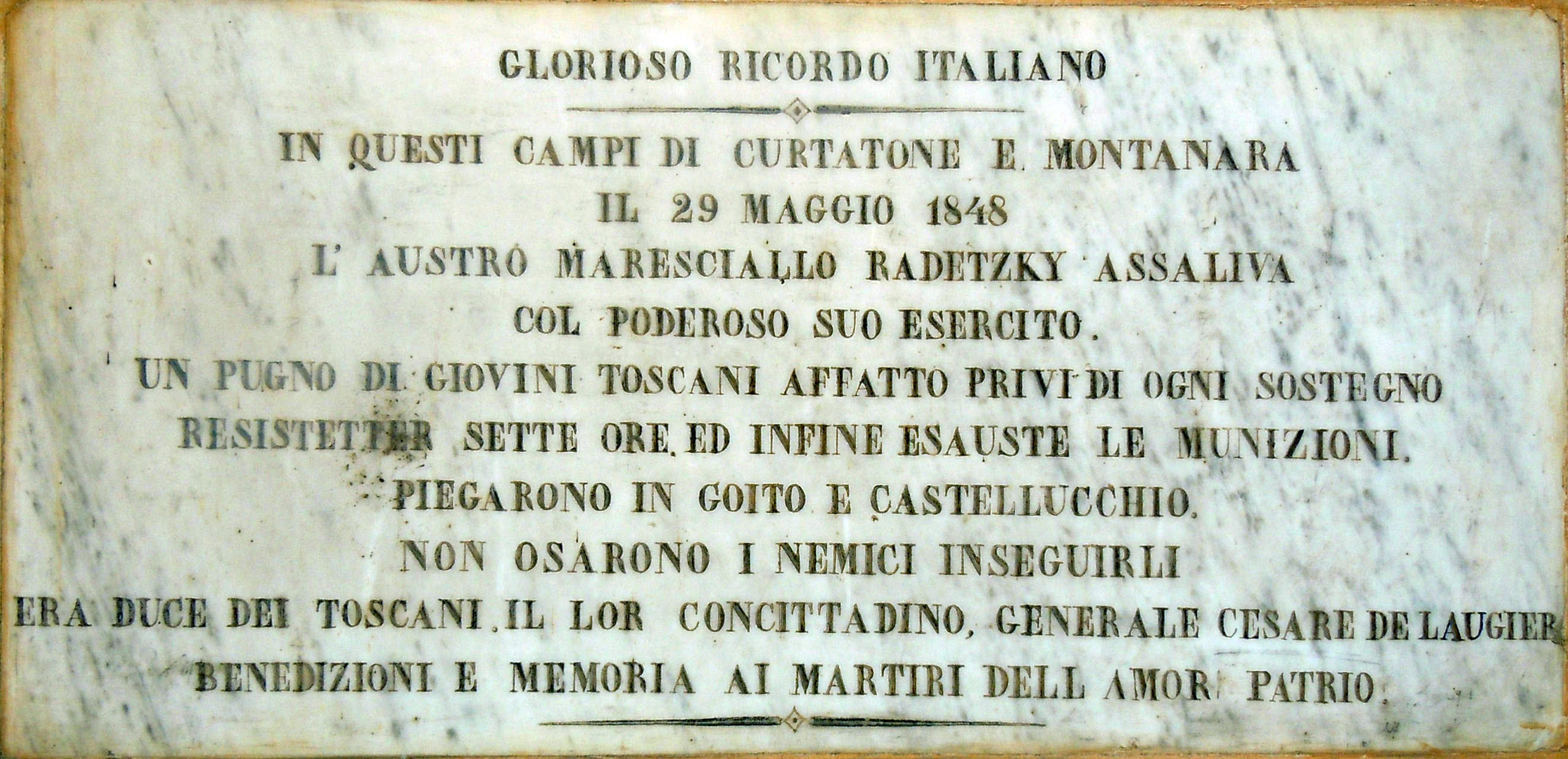
Plaque by General Laugier

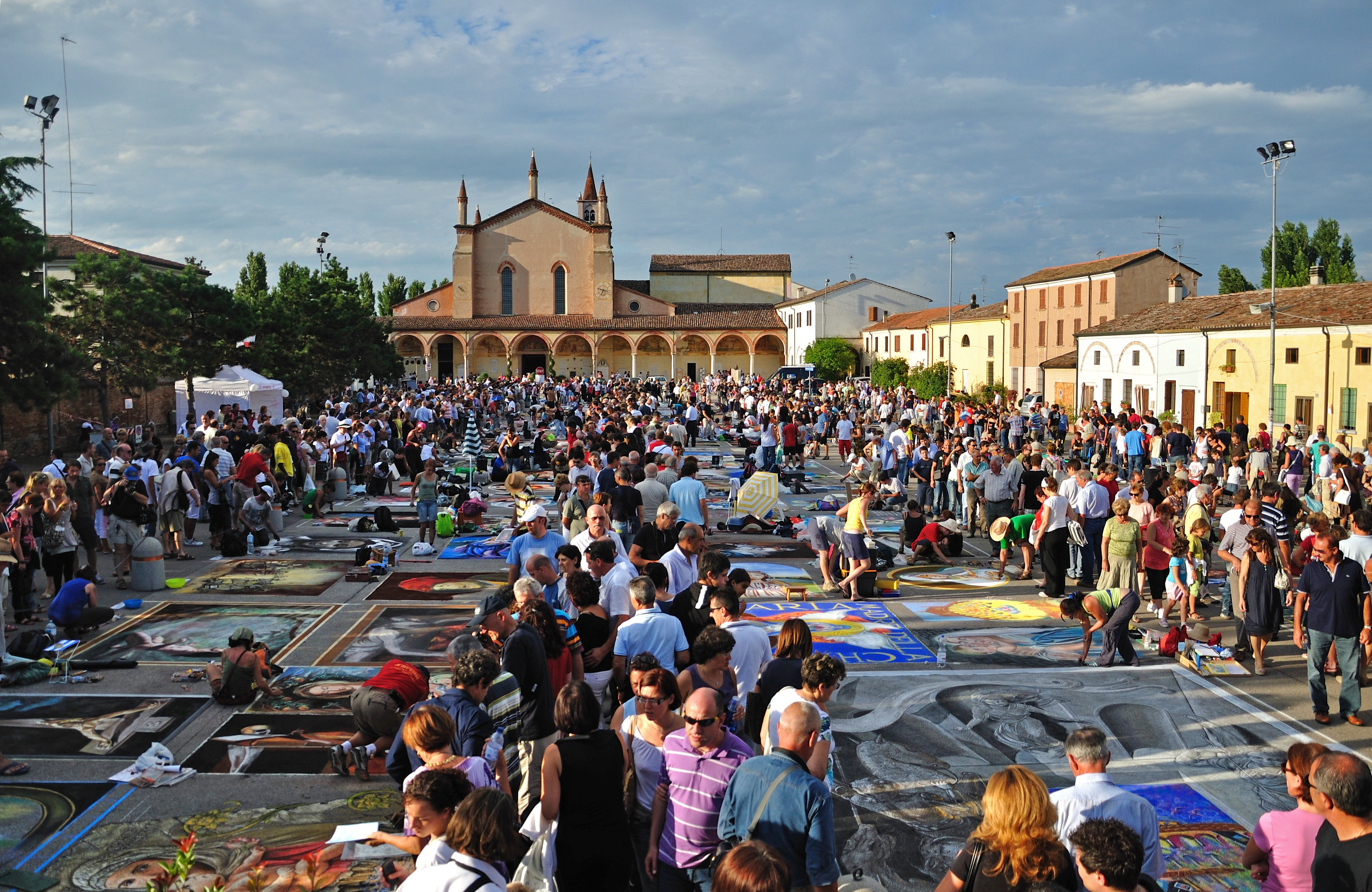
Ferie delle Grazie with chalk drawings
