= Leon Keer =

Dutch artist

- Born: 1980 (age 45–46)
- Known for: 3D Street Painting, Art
- Website: leonkeer.com

Painting 'Delicate' by Leon Keer

Leon Keer (born 1980) is a Dutch pop-surrealist artist.

He has created work on canvas and (3D) artwork on the streets across the world. Leon Keer is an artist in anamorphic street art. His art has been showcased in Europe, the United States, Russia, Mexico, the United Arab Emirates, Australia, New Zealand, and several Asian countries. In addition to using optical illusions, he often presents his art by adding new technologies, such as augmented reality and video mapping. The art is temporary, but the images are shared all over the world via social media.

Leon generally paints contemporary themes which involve environmental concerns and raise questions about the livability of the world.

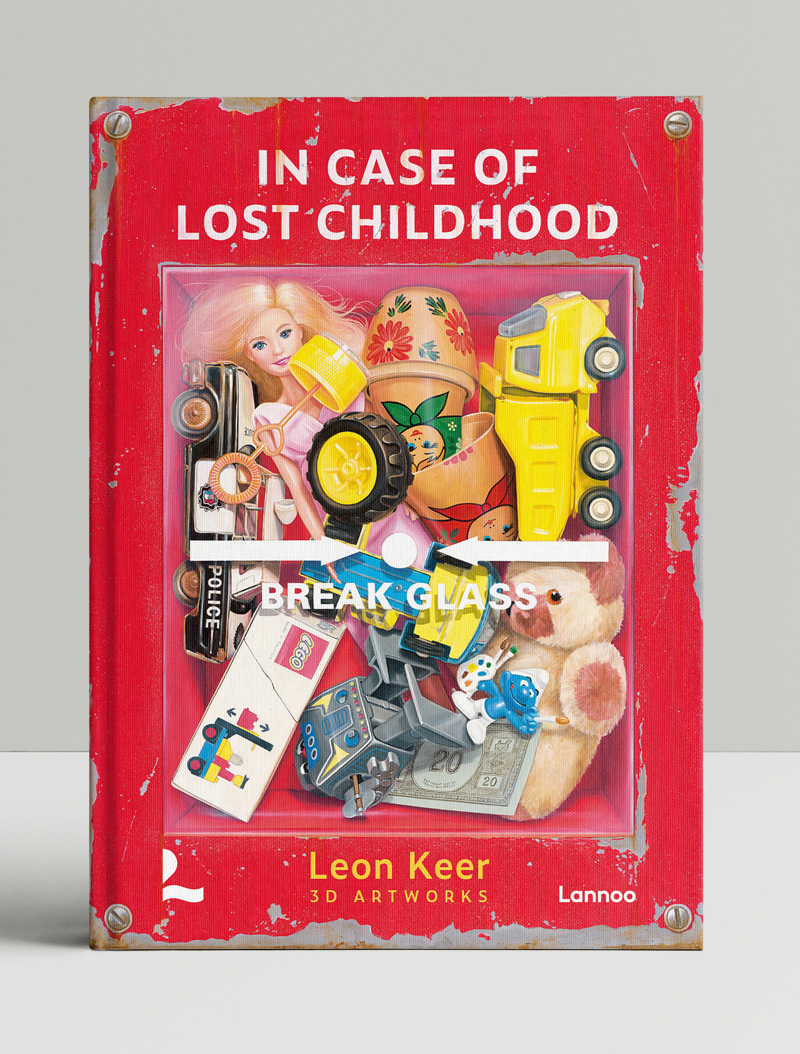
2020 book release In Case of Lost Childhood by Leon Keer

== Career ==
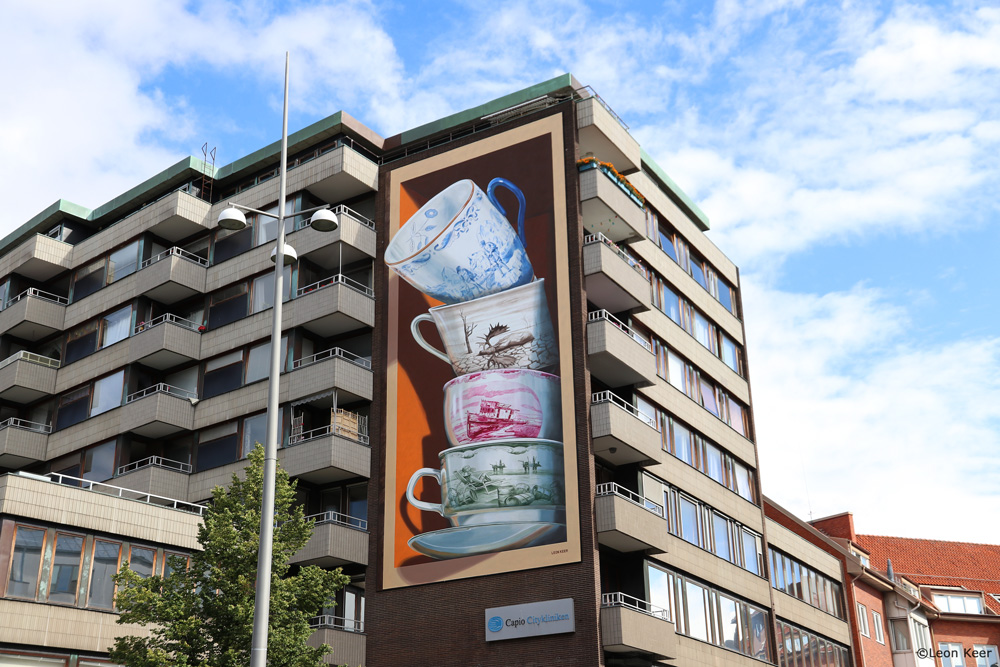
Leon Keer mural in Helsingborg.

Leon Keer designs and creates 2-D, 3-D and 4-D street art in the Netherlands and abroad. The 3-D Lego terracotta army is one of those creations. It was painted at the 2011 international Sarasota Chalk Festival.

At the 2010 festival in Sarasota, he made a surreal street painting with Little Red Riding Hood and Alice in Wonderland together, fighting against evil.

The anamorphic painting Piggy Bank was Keer's Japanese debut in 2013.

Keer created "Ego Leonard", a supposedly anonymous guerrilla artist.

Leon Keer exhibited a solo show, "Forced Perspective", at Wanrooij Gallery Amsterdam. Solo show 'Seeing Things' Wynwood Walls

Keer has exhibited at venues including the Fries Museum, Museum Arnhem, the Rijksmuseum Amsterdam, the Van Gogh Museum, Straat Museum Amsterdam, Escher Museum The Hague, the Long Beach Museum (CA), Princessehof Ceramics Museum , Science Museum Oklahoma, Wynwood Walls Miami, and GGA.
