= Ego Leonard =

Guerrilla art project by Leon Keer

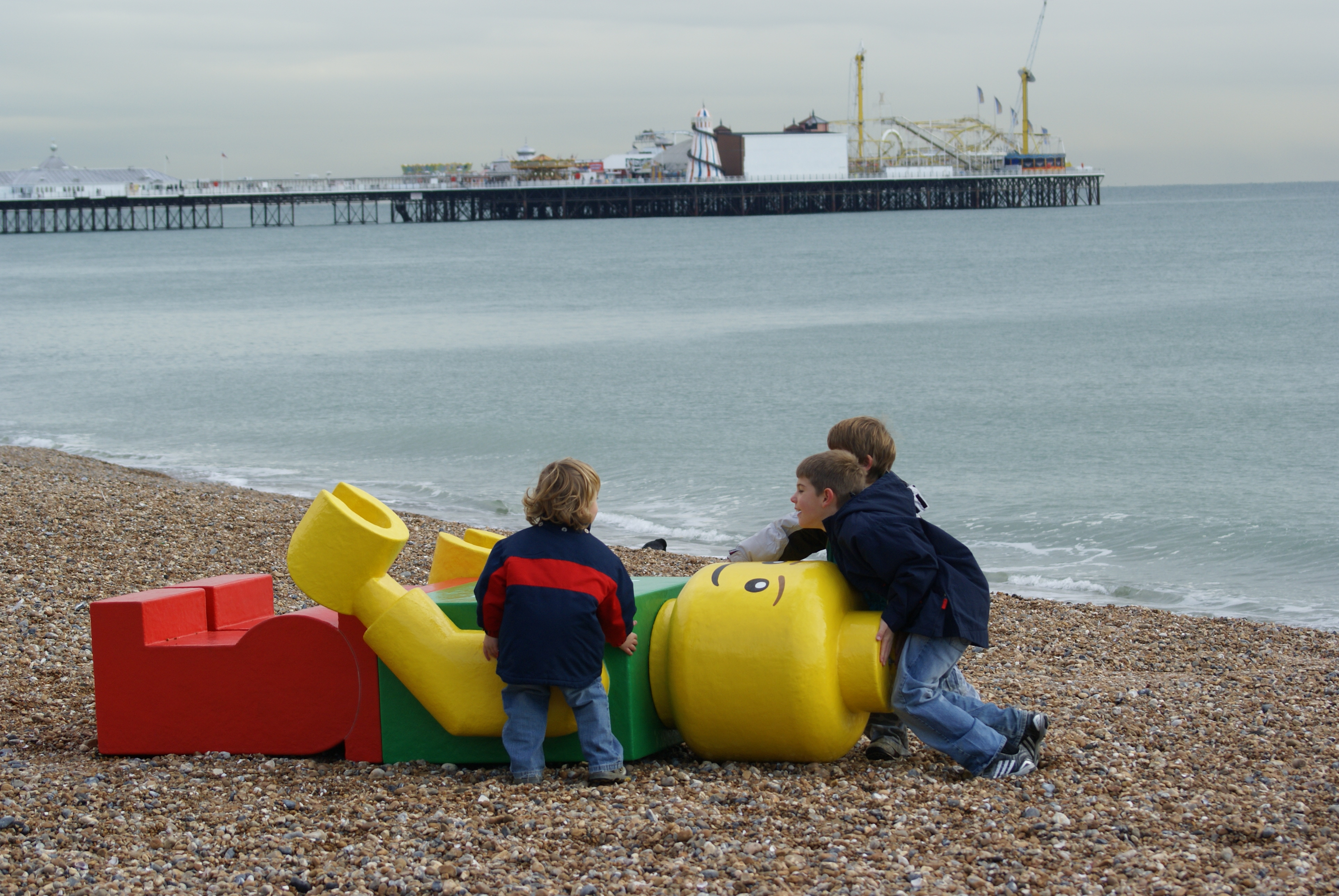
- Several children attempt to move the "Ego Leonard" appearing in 2008 at Brighton Beach near the Brighton Pier (visible in the background)
- Known for: Painting, sculpture
- Movement: Street art, performance art
- Website: https://www.leonkeer.com/ego-leonard/ http://www.egoleonard.nl/ego_gb.html

Ego Leonard is a guerrilla art project by Leon Keer, who also uses the name as a pseudonym, and Peter Westerink, founder of Planet Streetpainting and Streetpeter.com; the project consists primarily of outsized Lego figures. The name is also applied to sculptures, made by "Leonard", which have been found on beaches at various locations since the late 2000s. The sculptures are in the form of "minifigures", but are constructed from fibreglass enlarged to two and a half metres in height, and have the message "No Real Than You Are" in capital letters written on their torsos.

Ego Leonard can be reworked to read L, Ego or LEGO. The letters can also be rearranged to spell "A LEGO drone". The project received coverage in 2011, when it was found in Siesta Key Beach in Florida, United States.

== Lego sculptures ==
=== 2007 ===
The first oversized minifigure attributed to Leonard was retrieved from the sea off Zandvoort, Netherlands, on 7 August 2007. It had a yellow head and a blue torso. It was suggested at the time that "No Real Than You Are" might become a popular meme akin to "All your base are belong to us", or that a word is missing and it should read, "no more real than you are".

=== 2008 ===
A second giant Lego figure was found off Brighton Beach, United Kingdom, on 29 October 2008. The green, yellow, and red sculpture again bore the words "No Real Than You Are" on its torso. A spokeswoman for the Lego company stated that it was a surprise to the company, and perpetuated the idea that it may be related to a possible exhibition in the next few weeks held by "Ego Leonard" in London.

=== 2011 ===
Another similar Lego figure appeared in the sea off Siesta Key Beach, Florida, United States, on 25 October 2011. The sculpture is about 2 metres (6 feet) in height and weighs about 50 kilograms (110 lb). Its head and arms were yellow with a green torso and red legs, and it had the message "No real than you are" in capital letters on its front and "Ego Leonard" and the number 8 on its back. It was suggested that this may have been a viral marketing publicity stunt to advertise the newly opened Legoland Florida. A spokesperson for the Legoland and its parent company denied that there was any connection to the giant minifigure.

Sarasota authorities referred to the object as Mr. Leonard. Reporters from the local newspaper, Sarasota Herald-Tribune, sent an e-mail to Leonard and received a reply. It purported to be from the sculpture and stated that it had been "a hell of a swimm" [sic], but that it was enjoying the weather and friendly people, and was "gonna stay here for a while." The Sarasota County Sheriffs Office took the sculpture into custody, awaiting its release to Jeff Hindman, who first found it in October 2011. On 26 January 2012, however, the giant Lego figure was given to Denise Kowal, the founder of the Sarasota Chalk Festival.

Ego Leonard's painting in the Sarasota Chalk Festival featured outsized Lego figures with messages that were similar to, and included, "No real than you are". In reference to the 2011 appearance, the Spanish newspaper, El Mundo, noted that "Ego Leonard" could mean "I, Leonardo". It also could be read as, "I am Leonard". The paper noted that it has been reported that Ego Leonard may be associated with Dutch artist Leon Keer, who won second place in the 2010 Sarasota Chalk Festival and is due to compete again at the 2011 festival. Keer "admitted" to being a long-time friend of Ego Leonard's, and had designed his website. He also expressed concern that the publicity may have an adverse effect on "a person like Ego, who just wants to bring some kindness in the everyday life."

=== 2012 ===
A Lego figure similar to the Sarasota sculpture appeared on the beach at Topanga, Los Angeles County, California on 18 July 2012. After one day on the Topanga beach, the "Lego Man" was moved to "LAB ART", a Los Angeles City art gallery specializing in street art.

=== 2013 ===
Ego Leonard returned to Europe via plane. Area filmmaker Vincent Dale responded directly to the Lego man's message in a short film.

=== 2014 ===
An Ego Leonard minifigure washed up on Yugaihama beach in Kamakura, Japan, on 5 December 2014.

=== 2015 ===
An Ego Leonard minifigure was found floating on the river Danube in the City of Linz, on 2 June 2015. It was placed on the lawn in front of the concert hall Brucknerhaus. According to the Oberösterreichische Nachrichten, this minifigure "swam in the Danube" to participate in an Arts Festival in Linz.

== See also ==
- Rubber Duck (sculpture)
