= The Garbage-Men =

US musical group

- Origin: Sarasota, Florida, USA
- Genres: Surf rock; experimental rock; busking; performance art; culture jamming; comedy music; harmolodics
- Years active: 2010–present
- Members: Wesley Backer; Jack Berry; Trent Berry; Harrison Paparatto; Jamie Tremps; Syndie Pennavaria; Jamieson Martel
- Past members: Ollie Gray; Zach Zildjian; Alex Eiffert; Evan Tucker; Austin Siegel; Jackson Cacioppo; Akiem Esdaile; Paul Colin
- Website: http://www.thegarbagemen.com

The Garbage-Men is an American musical group of youths from Sarasota, Florida teaching sustainability through music. The band promotes recycling, a green eco-friendly message, by playing music on instruments they make from garbage and recycled materials. The Garbage-Men perform their instrumental interpretations of classic hits for audiences large and small at various venues including street festivals, science museums, and charity events. They can often be seen busking on street corners, including a show in Times Square, NYC.

The band has appeared on America's Got Talent, CNN, NPR's Science Friday, TIME Magazine for Kids, The Blue Man Group's Invent an Instrument Contest, and PBS Gulf Coast Journal with Jack Perkins], the latter of which received an Emmy. The band is also referenced in the paperback edition of Garbology: Our Dirty Love Affair with Trash by Pulitzer Prize–winning author, Edward Humes.

They have volunteered to perform and help charitable non-profit organizations such as The New York Hall of Science, The Marie Selby Botanical Gardens, Giving Hunger The Blues, Sarasota County Public Library, Mote Marine Laboratory, The Museum of Science and Industry, The South Florida Museum, The Orlando Science Center, Mayors' Feed the Hungry Program, Mothers Helping Mothers, WMNF and WSRQ community radio, and others. The band donates 100% of the proceeds from the sale of their CD to Heifer International and other charities. The band was founded in 2010 by Ollie Gray and Jack Berry.

== Personnel ==
- Wesley Backer: 7-Piece Trash Can Drums, Baking Sheet Gong
- Jack Berry: 1-String Lucky Charms Lead Guitar, Fax Machine Handset Vocal Microphone
- Trent Berry: 1-String Frosted Flakes Bass Guitar
- Harrison Paparatto: Hula Horn, Fisher Price Corn Popper Toy Saxophone
- Jamie Tremps: Glass Bottle Marimba, Walker Whistle, Rotary Dial Telephone Vocal Microphone
- Syndie Pennavaria: Cigar Box Rhythm Guitar, Push Button Telephone Vocal Microphone
- Jamieson Martel: Tin Can Timbales, A/C Vent Washboard, Bottle Cap Tambourine, Spoons, Vocals

== Instruments ==
All instruments are constructed from every day items found in the trash or recycle bin.

=== Strings ===
Electric guitar - The electric guitar is a 1-stringed, plucked string instrument featuring a cereal box body, yard stick neck, bottle cap pick-up, lipstick bottle bridge, tooth pick frets, and shoelace strap. It is the lead instrument and is used to play melodies.

Electric Bass Guitar - The electric bass guitar is a 1-stringed, fretless bass featuring a cereal box body, yard stick neck, comb bridge, soda can thumb rest, and duck tape strap. Occasionally the upright bass is used in place of the electric bass for songs that require a more jazz-like feel. It is made from a wooden box and a PVC pipe.

Electric Violin - The electric violin is a 1-stringed chordophone played with a shoe horn bow and made from a cereal box body, paint stick neck, clothespin bridge, and cassette tape tailpiece. It plays harmonies and leads.

=== Winds ===
Trombone - The trombone is made from re-purposed PVC pipe and an oil funnel bell. It uses a slide made from PVC and a mouthpiece made from a bottle.

E♭ Contrabass Bugle - The bugle is made from re-purposed PVC pipe and a traffic cone for the bell. It is limited to notes within the harmonic series because the embouchure controls the pitch.

Flute - The flute is made from a small section of PVC pipe with drilled holes to play an E♭ pentatonic scale. It is keyless.

Alto Saxophone - The saxophone is a keyless aerophone with holes drilled to play an E♭ pentatonic scale. It uses a Corn popper toy for the body, a balloon for the reed, and a medicine bottle ligature. A recent addition is a microphone made from an ear bud.

Contra-alto Clarinet - The clarinet plays chromatically in the key of E♭. It features a re-purposed PVC pipe body, bottle cap keys, and a balloon reed.

=== Percussion ===
Drum kit - The drums include various items found in the garbage. The kit features a paint bucket snare, water jug toms, compost bin bass drum, metal trash can lid cymbals, tin can cowbell, and a porcelain bowl gong. The drum kit is used to keep time and fill empty measures.

Chromatic Percussion - The glass bottle idiophone is made from recycled glass bottles and uses tooth brush mallets. It can play chords and melodies.

== Awards ==
The Garbage-Men have won several awards for their benevolent efforts throughout the community and the world, including Heifer International Pass on the Gift, The City of Sarasota, The Sarasota County Commission, the Keep Sarasota County Beautiful environmental organization, and their WEDU segment won an Emmy from the National Academy of Television Arts & Sciences.
