= Youth in arts =

Youth in Arts is a non-profit organization that provides visual and performing arts instruction to public and private school students and enriches the community with cultural events. Youth in Arts has been providing arts education to students in the San Francisco Bay Area since 1970. It is based in San Rafael, Ca. The Artists in Schools program brings artists into classrooms to teach visual and performing arts in extended residencies or shorter workshop programs and also provides training for teachers and parents in supporting students' learning and development through the arts.

Youth in Arts also houses the only children's art gallery in the Northern Bay Area. Youth in Arts reaches over 30,000 youth annually. Youth in Arts creates interactive public art works at the Marin County Fair. During July 2013, Youth in Arts worked with over 600 youth and professional artists to create the world's biggest pop up book spanning 48' long and 6' high.

An independent evaluation of the Artists in Schools program, funded by a grant from the California Arts Council, found that three-quarters of the students participating showed a more positive attitude toward learning in an arts-inclusive classroom. Some schools pay Youth in Arts for programming. The agency also fundraises to offset costs and to provide free programs to schools that cannot afford to pay.

In addition to the Artists in Schools program, Youth in Arts Presents offers live performances to thousands of local students through Theater Shows and Assemblies; VSA arts and "Arts Unite Us" provide tailored programs to special needs students and bring together students of differing abilities through the arts and 'Til Dawn is a teen a cappella program for advanced young vocalists.

Youth in Arts founded the Italian Street Painting Festival in downtown San Rafael and ran that event for 17 years, that event is now being continued by a separate organization, Italian Street Painting Marin.
