= Tracy Lee Stum =

American artist

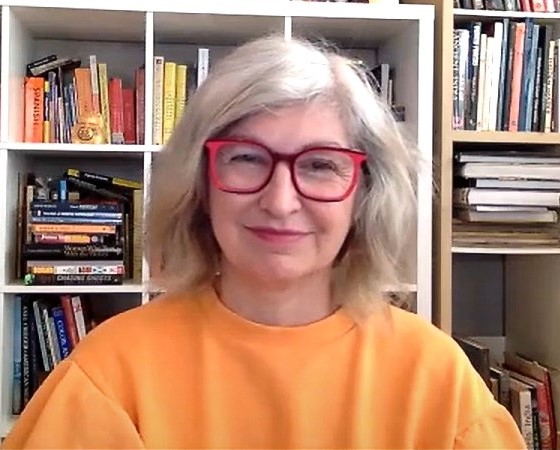
- Stum in 2021
- Born: Chambersburg, Pennsylvania, U.S
- Spouse: Sayak Mitra
- Website: www.tracyleestum.com

Tracy Lee Stum is an American artist best known for her 3D street paintings or chalk drawings making use of anamorphosis. In 2006, she held the Guinness World Record for the Largest Chalk Painting by an individual.

She is the founder of the Tilt Museums in New Jersey, USA and in Puerto Vallarta, Mexico,

== Early life and education ==
Stum taught herself to draw as a child, and later went on to earn a bachelor's degree at the Tyler School of Art in Philadelphia. She continued her studies in naturalism at the Florence Academy of Art in Italy.

== Career ==
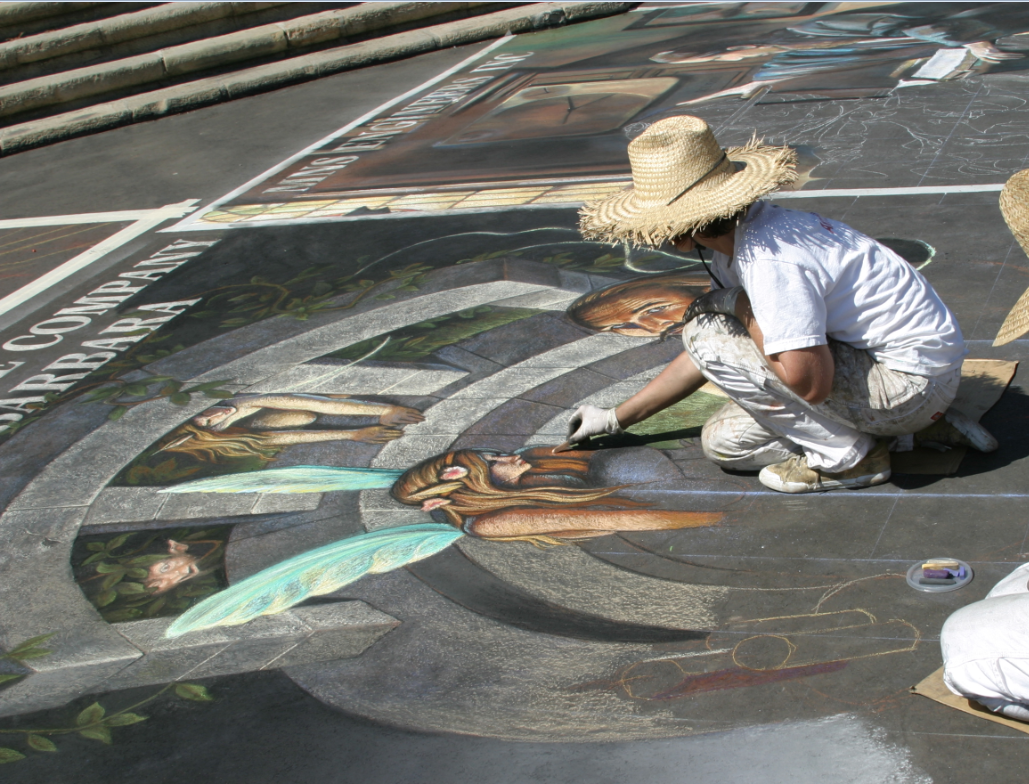
Stum at 2011 street painting festival

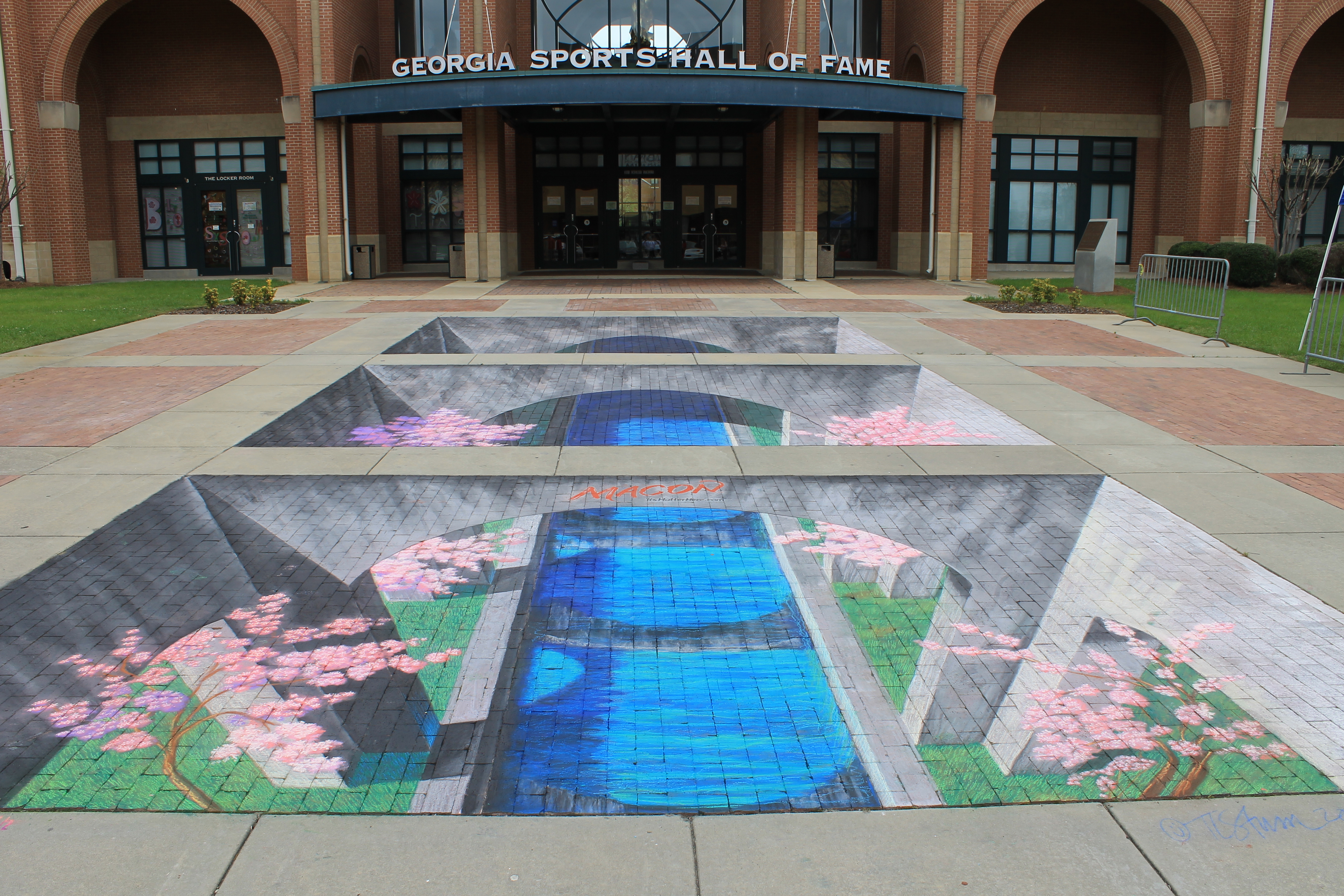
Interactive 3d sidewalk painting at the Macon, Georgia's International Cherry Blossom Festival in front of the Georgia Sports Hall of Fame

Stum is based in California and began street painting in 1998. She creates 3D optical illusion art using chalk. In 2006 she held the Guinness World Record for the Largest Chalk Painting by an individual after creating a 10 meter by 5 meter recreation of Leonardo Da Vinci's The Last Supper.

Later in 2013, she was a contributor to the Cannes Gold Lion award-winning team for their work in a Honda CRV commercial. That year, she curated the first annual DO/AC 3D Chalk Festival in Atlantic City, New Jersey, incorporating 14 international 3D street art & chalk artists.

She has developed street painting festivals in China, Mexico, India, Russia, and throughout the United States. She has taught workshops about street art at colleges and universities.

Stum is the creator of the Tilt Museum in East Rutherford, New Jersey. She opened a second museum in Puerto Vallarta, Jalisco, Mexico, in 2022.
