= Laurel Park Historic District =

Historic district in Florida, United States

- U.S. National Register of Historic Places
- U.S. Historic district
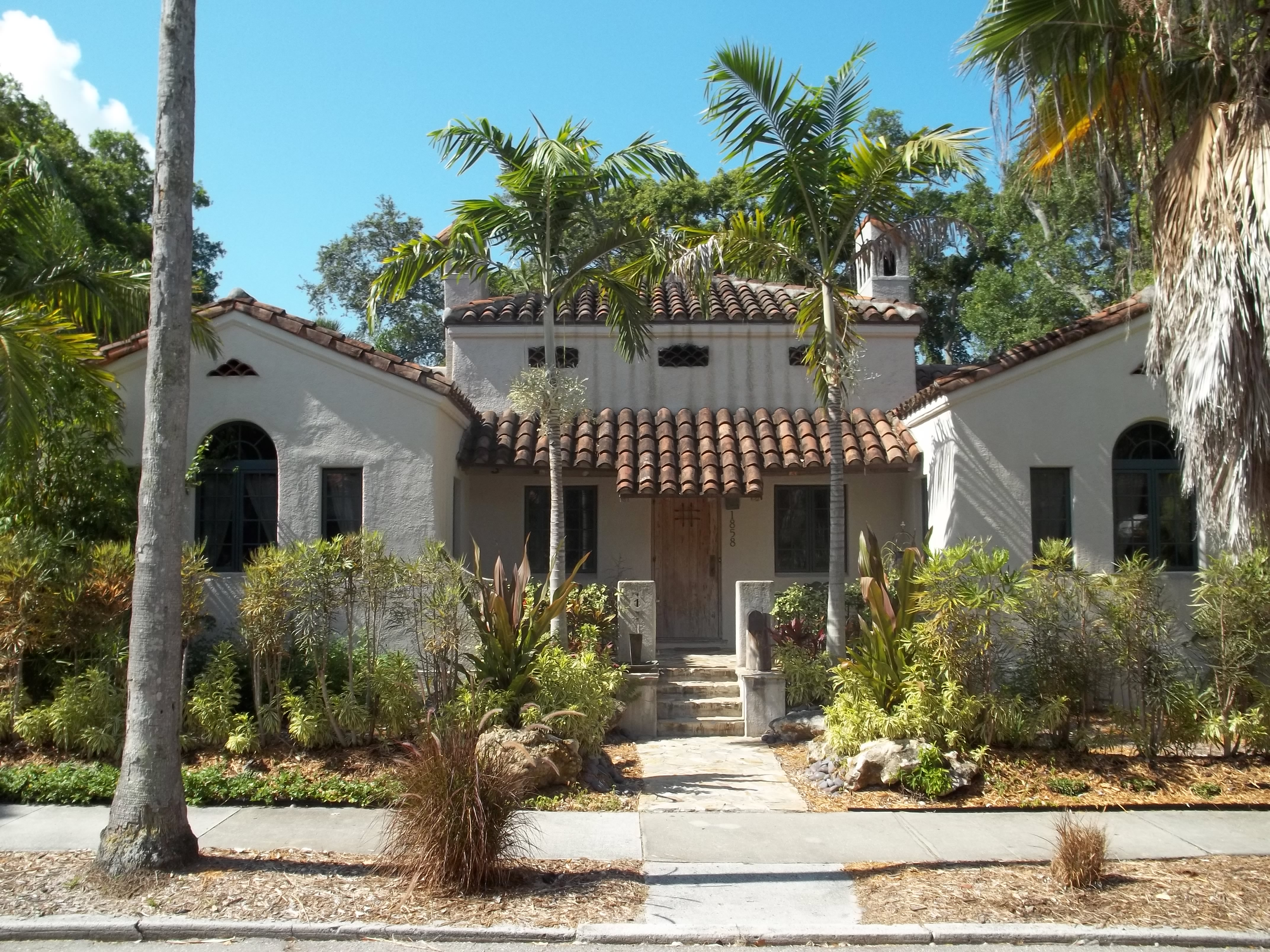

- Location within Florida Location within the United States
- Location: Sarasota, Florida, USA
- Coordinates: 27°19′52″N 82°32′5″W
- NRHP reference No.: 08000164
- Added to NRHP: March 11, 2008

Laurel Park Historic District is a historic district in Sarasota, Florida, United States. It is bounded by Morrill Street, Orange Avenue, Brother Geenen Way, Julia Place and Lafayette Court. On March 11, 2008, it was added to the U.S. National Register of Historic Places.
