= Street painting =

Pavement, street, or sidewalk art

Street Artist at Dusk in Swanston St, Melbourne

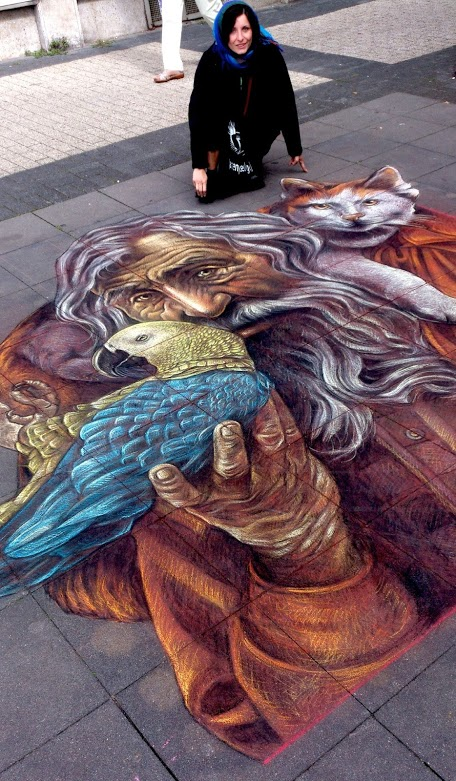
Vera Bugatti, "The Storytellers", 35th international street painting competition in

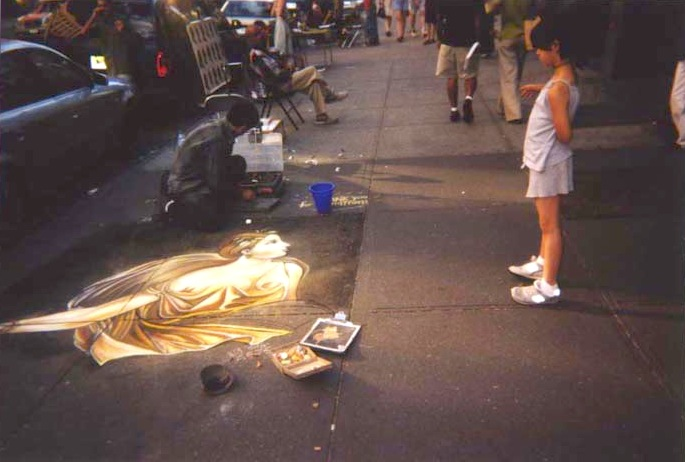
A street painter working in New York City

Leon Keer 'Lego Terracotta Army' Sarasota US

Street painting, also known as screeving, pavement art, street art, and sidewalk art, is the performance art of rendering artistic designs on pavement such as streets, sidewalks, and town squares with impermanent and semi-permanent materials such as chalk.

== Origin ==
The origins of modern street painting can be traced to Britain. Pavement artists were found all over the United Kingdom and by 1890 it was estimated that more than 500 artists were making a full-time living from pavement art in London alone.

The British term for a pavement artist is a "screever". The term is derived from the writing style, often Copperplate, that typically accompanied the works of pavement artists since the 1700s. The term screever has originated from 1875-1880

The Irish word for ‘writing’ is ‘scriobh’, (pronounced ‘screev’).

The works of screevers often were accompanied by poems and proverbs, lessons on morality, and political commentary on the day’s events. They were described as "producing a topical, pictorial newspaper of current event." They appealed to both the working people, who (on the whole) could not read or write, but understood the visual images; and to the educated members of the middle-classes who appreciated the moral lessons and comments. It was important for a screever to catch the eye of the ‘well to do’ and in turn attract the pennies donated for their efforts.

Street painters, (also called chalk artists) a name these performance artists are most commonly called in the United States are called I Madonnari in Italy (singular form: madonnaro or madonnara) because they recreated images of the Madonna. In Germany, the word is Straßenmaler (streets: "Straßen", painter: "Maler").

The Italian Madonnari have been traced to the sixteenth century. They were itinerant artists, many of whom had been brought into the cities to work on the huge cathedrals. When the work was completed, they needed to find another way to make a living, and thus often would recreate the paintings from the church onto the pavement. Aware of festivals and holy days held in each province and town, they traveled to join in the festivities to make a living from observers who would throw coins if they approved of the artist's work. For centuries, many Madonnari were folk artists, reproducing simple images with crude materials such as tiles, coal, and chalk. Others, such as El Greco, would go on to become household names.

In 1973, street painting was being promoted in Italy by the formation of a two-day festival in Grazie di Curtatone in the Province of Mantua.

In the 1980s, Kurt Wenner practiced '3-D pavement art', or one-point perspective art, otherwise known as anamorphic art, a 500-year-old technique, which appears in proper perspective only when viewed from a specific angle.

== Festivals ==
The first recorded street-painting competition and 'festival' was held in London in 1906.

In 1972 the first 'Italian' International Street Painting Competition was held in Grazie di Curtatone, Italy. It is part of festival celebrating the Assumption with the streets of the city being turned over to the festival.

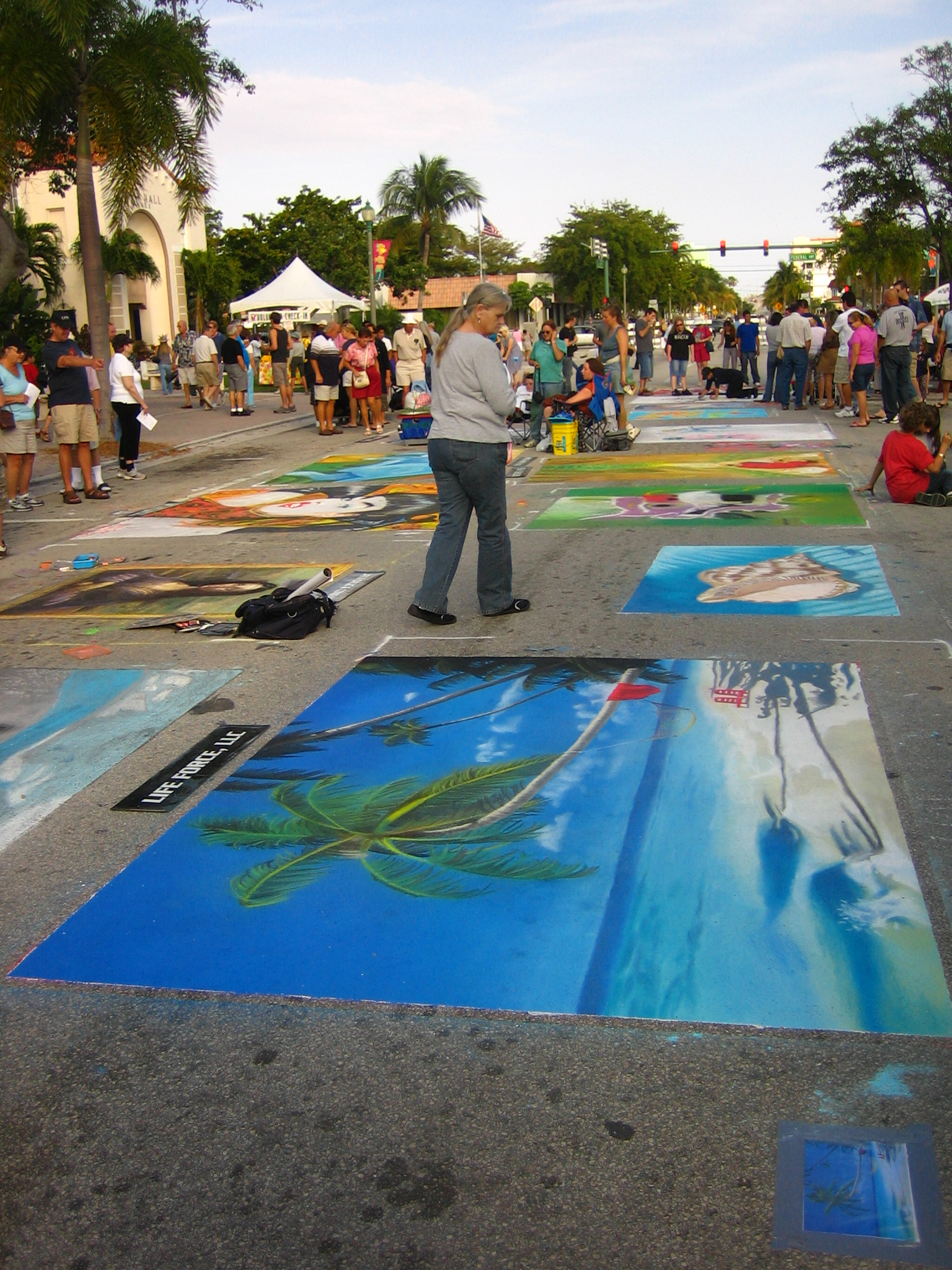
The Lake Worth Street Painting Festival in 2009, looking eastward along Lake Avenue near the City Hall Annex

In 1987, Wenner and Manfred Stader introduced street painting to Old Mission Santa Barbara, California.

One of the largest events in the United States is the Lake Worth Beach Street Painting Festival, held in Lake Worth Beach, Florida. Started in 1994, it attracts 100,000 visitors over the weekend to see 250 works of art by over 400 artists.

In 1993, Rosy Loyola created Festival Bella Via in Monterrey, Mexico, which has launched several Mexican artists into the international street painting field. Within the years it has become the most important street painting festival in Latin America.

Started in 2002, The Denver Chalk Art Festival on Larimer Square, located in Downtown Denver, is a free two-day street-painting festival. More than 200 artists spend hours during the weekend turning the streets of Larimer Square into a museum of chalk art. The Festival is produced by the Larimer Arts Association, a nonprofit organization dedicated to promoting arts awareness and education in Denver.

In 2008 Mark Wagner and 6,000 people (over 4,000 elementary school kids from Alameda, CA) set a Guinness World Record for the World's largest Pavement Art covering over 90,000 sq. ft. (8,361 sq. meters). A satellite photograph was taken of the artwork.

In 2010, the First International Street Painting Festival held in the United States was organized by Denise Kowal, president of the Avenida de Colores, Inc. 501(c)(3) nonprofit corporation that produces the Sarasota Chalk Festival. More than 250 street painters attended the Halloween-themed festival of 2010 that featured street painters from around the world and ran for eight and a half days.

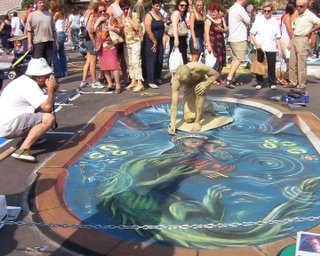
Painter Manuel Bastante, Pantomime Pablo Zibes, Festival Mantova, Italy

In 2011 the First International StreetArt was staged in Wilhelmshaven in Germany. The event was scheduled to return in August 2012.

At Sarasota's 2011 chalk festival Dutch artist Leon Keer and the team of Planet Streetpainting created the 3-D street painting of the Lego Terracotta Army. The chalk painting was inspired by Chinese Emperor Qin Shi Huang's Terracotta Army "in honor of the arrival of Ego Leonard and to support his release out of his custody.

In July 2011, the 3-Way-Split Project produced the First Annual in Southend-on-Sea, Essex, United Kingdom. The city of Lake Worth Beach, Florida, is cited as the source of inspiration, by the project director. Nine street artists from the United States came to Southend-on-Sea to support the launch of this new annual event. In 2012 the festival was held on the second Saturday in September.

In August 2012 the Second International StreetArt was staged in Wilhelmshaven in Germany. 37 artists from all over the world traveled to Wilhelmshaven in Germany. Also the largest anamorphic pavement art 3-D streetpainting picture was built by: Gregor Wosik, Lydia Hitzfeld, Melanie Siegel, und Vanessa Hitzfeld.

In 2012, A company called We Talk Chalk, led by Creative Director Melanie Stimmell, and Remco Van Latum, introduced the art of 3-D street painting to countries such as Israel and Thailand. The city of Chiang Mai hosted their first street painting festival in March 2012. To celebrate the ninetieth anniversary of Tel Aviv suburb Ramat Hasharon, Israeli and 8 International artists from 'We Talk Chalk' used 3-D chalk drawings to transform Bialik Street into an urban art compound. The festival had as many as 50,000 visitors, including Israel’s President Shimon Peres who posed with paintings by Melanie Stimmell and Ruben Poncia.

== See also ==
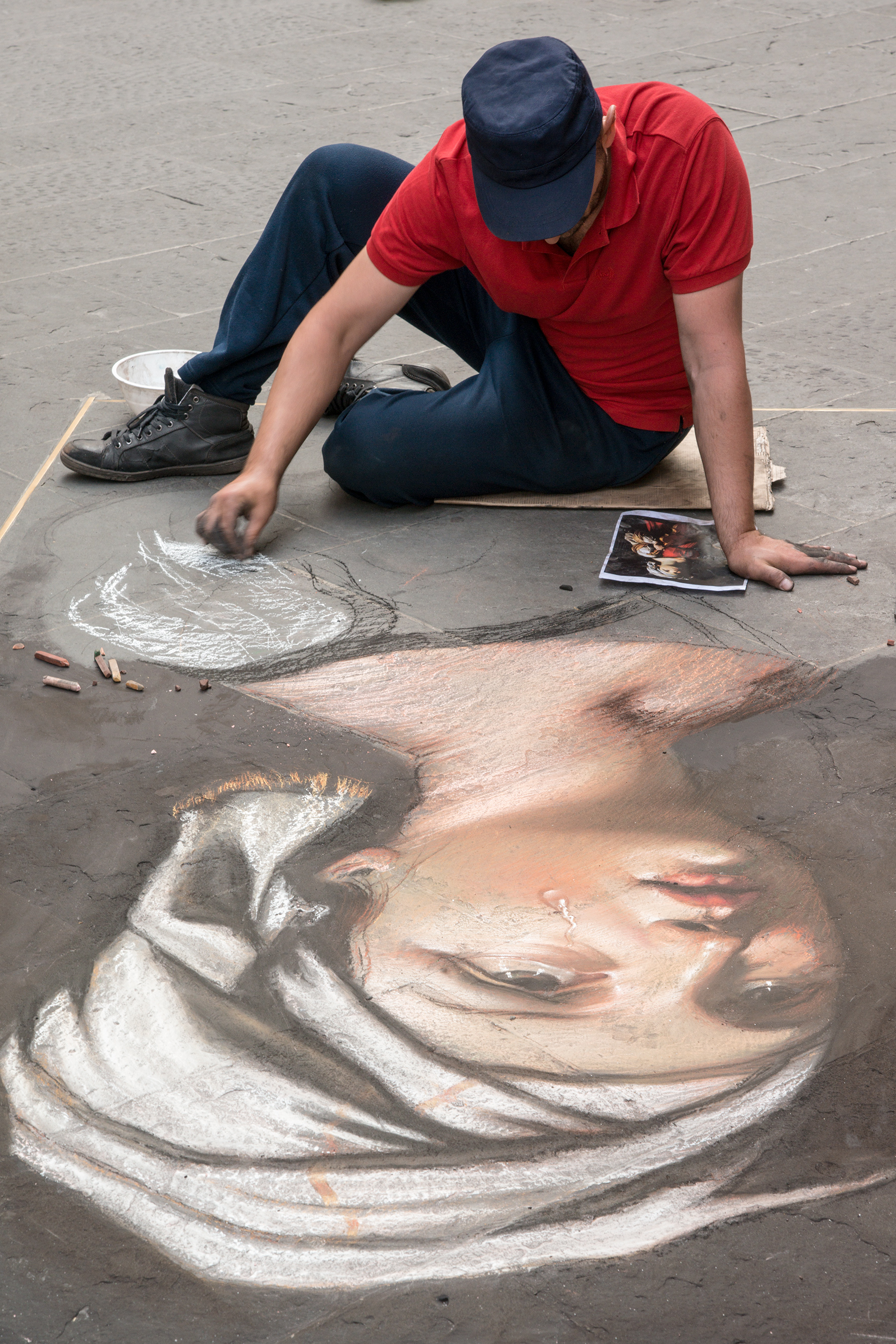
Street artist (chalks) in Florence, Italy

- Anamorphic art
- Art destruction
- Graffiti
- Kolam
- List of street artists
- Sidewalk chalk
- Street art
- Street artist
- Via Colori
- Rainbow crossing
