= Michael Godard =

American artist (born 1963)

- Born: Michael Godard; March 10, 1963 (age 63); Southern California
- Education: University of Nevada, Las Vegas; ArtCenter College of Design
- Movement: Pop art
- Website: michaelgodard.com

Michael Godard (born March 10, 1963) is an American artist. He is known for his flamboyant pop art of anthropomorphic olives and strawberries. His long-haired, rockstar-inspired public image has led to his nickname Rockstar of the Art World.

== Early life ==
Michael Godard was born on March 10, 1963, in Southern California. His parents were on welfare and food stamps and he had trouble making friends as a child. He attended the University of Nevada, Las Vegas, but dropped out due to his gambling addiction. He later attended the ArtCenter College of Design.

== Career ==
Godard originally worked in Orange County, California, creating architectural design plans for a firm. He was later hired as a drafter after faking his résumé, lying that he was an engineer, and signing his name on another person's plan. Godard learned engineering while on the job and went to night school to educate himself on metallurgy, geometric dimensioning and tolerancing. and calculus. He was laid off after working as a drafter for twelve years and rising to supervise 250 people.

After being laid off, Godard began painting while living out of his car to help raise his children. He attended "drink and draw" events at bars and restaurants, where he was paid in food. He first began painting his signature anthropomorphic olives and strawberries after he painted a martini for the birthday of one of his friends, an art collector who liked martinis with two olives. He took influence from the party lifestyle of Las Vegas, where he was living at the time. His art subsequently became popular with art galleries and celebrities such as Ozzy Osbourne, Mötley Crüe, and Criss Angel; the latter, in part, due to Godard's long-haired, rockstar appearance. He has painted custom guitars for Guns N' Roses, created the cover for Dishwalla's 2005 self-titled album, created a slot machine, Godard's Rockin' Olives, in collaboration with Aristocrat Leisure, launched a vodka and gin brand named after himself. He also appeared on shows such as Criss Angel Mindfreak, American Casino, Inked, and Cathouse: The Series. Godard was also commissioned by the Las Vegas Raiders to oversee the artwork at the then-under-construction Allegiant Stadium.

== Personal life ==
Godard married and divorced young and has three daughters, one of whom, Paige, died from brain cancer at 16 in 2006. He has philanthropized to charities such as the St. Jude Children's Research Hospital, Make-A-Wish Foundation, Nevada Cancer Institute, and Sharon Osbourne Colon Cancer Foundation whilst making continuous visits to children's hospitals across the country to paint for the disabled, injured, or terminally ill.
