= Owen Burns (developer) =

American businessman (1869–1937)

Owen Burns, a significant developer of Sarasota, Florida – Lillian Burns Collection, Sarasota History Center archive

Owen Burns (October 31, 1869 – August 28, 1937) was an American entrepreneur, banker, builder, and land developer who at one time owned the majority of the land comprising Sarasota, Florida. He developed or built many of its historic structures, developments, roads, seawalls, and bridges. He became a leader in the community, contributing to its growth and development. He was born in Fredericktown in Cecil County on the Eastern Shore of Maryland.

== Early life ==
He was born into a North Carolina family that dates to Francis Burns, who left Ayrshire, Ayr County, Scotland for America in 1734 with Gabrielle Johnston (who came to act as a colonial governor). Francis Burns was granted land by the king of England, which remains in family ownership. The county seat, Burnsville, North Carolina, is named for Owen's grandfather, Otway Burnes Sr., a privateer naval hero and legislator, and the town of Otway, in Carteret County, North Carolina also is named for him. As a visitor, Owen Burns had come to Sarasota from Chicago for its famed fishing and in 1910, settled there, and remained for the rest of his life. He also helped with the promotion of the developing community, contributing to the attraction of many around the country to Sarasota.

He married Vernona Hill Freeman, a woman he met while she was vacationing in Sarasota. As she was leaving town by rail to return to Massachusetts, Burns impetuously boarded the train as well and courted her as she was returning home. He successfully persuaded her to return to Florida in order to marry him. They were married in Sarasota on June 4, 1912, raising their five children in the community in a large home near the harbor. They also became the parents of the most important historian for the community, Lillian G. Burns.

Lillian became a significant benefactor for the community as well, donating a large collection of historical materials and artifacts related to her family and Sarasota to the county archives so that they would become resources that would be preserved and kept open to the public. She also taught researchers how to conduct effective interviews of historical figures and to create unbiased research, held free brown-bag luncheon lectures downtown, and conducted tours of the community that were enriched by her extensive, first-hand knowledge of its history. Her younger sister, Harriet Burns Stieff, continued the donations and participation in the historical community after the death of Lillian.

== Career ==
Not only did Owen Burns become the largest landowner in the city, but he founded its first locally owned bank, Citizens Bank of Sarasota, promoted the development of other businesses, participated in the founding of a board of trade that was the precursor of the Chamber of Commerce, and built its bridges, sea walls, landmark buildings, and mansions. He urged the paving of roads such as Main Street. The list of buildings he built that have been placed on the local and the National Register of Historic Places, is impressive. He platted the subdivisions of Inwood Park and Washington Park.

He dredged the harbor and around Saint Armand Key, Lido Key, and Longboat Key. He also created new bay front points with reclaimed soils, enlarging Cedar Point to Golden Gate Point. He created novel developments such as Burns Court as rental quarters to attract tourists who could afford to buy second homes in Sarasota after becoming familiar with the community and he built commercial establishments to generate additional impetus to the growing community, such as his Herald Square developments.

Now popularly known as Burns Square, Herald Square was on First Street before new street numbering and naming was introduced. The historic Burns building forms a triangle as Orange Avenue and Pineapple Avenue diverge in the midst of what also is called "Little Five Points". Architect Dwight James Baum was involved in the design. Although the building featured shops on the first floor, Burns entitled the triangular building as the "Pineapple Apartments". This is where downtown Sarasota began in the 1920s. The shops continue to thrive. To the east of the triangular building and across one of the diverging streets, on Orange Avenue Burns built the first Herald (newspaper) building that years after relocation of the newspaper became the home of the Sarasota Woman's Exchange, now just entitled, The Exchange. The presence of the newspaper building lent its name to the square at that time, which now is unknown to many, hence the popular drift toward calling the building and the square by Burn's name. In 2001, a historical marker was placed on the site by the county that relates many details about Burns and his square and a historic district has been designated for this enclave in this area of town that contains so many of his buildings and is entitled, Burns Square Historic District.

A youthful Owen Burns – Sarasota County History Center

The Owen Burns building at Herald Square, the Pineapple Apartments, has been restored recently, a second renovation by its owner of more than thirty years, Denise Kowal. In the first renovation she added new features to the exterior, such as balconies of wrought iron and stylish colors, replacing the wooden originals made with pecky cypress timbers. The second renovation was a restoration, going back to the historic character of the building. Added features were removed and the original finish of the building restored, including its color. The building contains shops, a restaurant, offices, and apartments. In 2025, Kowal was recognized for her restoration with an award by the county that was presented by the Sarasota Alliance for Historic Preservation.

On what currently is First Street, near the hotel he named after his wife and his real estate office, Burns built the second Times Building (another newspaper). Nearby stands the Belle Haven, originally named El Vernona Apartments, which was built as an apartment building and was renovated to contain office spaces before being emptied to make way for a development now gone bad. After all around it has been demolished, a glimmer of hope remained that the charming historic building would be maintained and as of 2023, that has been fulfilled. In 1911, Burns also built the first Saint Martha's Church, which was named for the patron saint of his mother, Martha A. Burns, on a lot she donated. Hugh Browning served as the contractor. It stood at the intersection of Adelia Street and Fruitville Road. In 1941, the current church building, directly to the west of the original church and at the intersection of Fruitville with Orange Avenue, was completed for its first mass on Easter in 1941. Burns assisted in the founding of the Sarasota Woman's Club, which now houses the Florida Studio Theatre, and, along with other community leaders such as Charles Ringling, encouraged the 1921 creation of Sarasota County by separation from Manatee County.

In 1925, Burns built the El Vernona Hotel, naming it after his wife. He also was the builder of Cà d'Zan, the residence of Mable and John Ringling. He had entered into a business partnership with John Ringling to develop offshore lands that Burns owned, a fateful decision that bankrupted him when that partner failed to live up to commitments on development agreements for the barrier islands (keys). Shortly after the opening of the hotel, a land boom crash in Florida struck a fatal blow to his finances because of the unfulfilled partnership agreement.

On November 2, 2009, the Sarasota municipal government officially proclaimed October 25 through October 31, 2010 as Owen Burns Week

Ironically, it was the same former partner, John Ringling, who took advantage of the situation and purchased the hotel for a small portion of its value, although several years later, he also would follow Burns into financial ruin. All of the real estate sales for development of Lido Key were transacted through the Burns real estate office that was adjacent to the hotel.

He then founded several businesses, including a citrus growing and jelly enterprise. Retaining his interest in game fishing and boating that had drawn him to Sarasota, Burns became the commodore of the Sarasota Yacht Club that he reorganized.

Burns died of a coronary thrombosis on August 28, 1937, at his home in Sarasota.

== Legacy ==
By a proclamation on November 2, 2009, that cited many of his achievements, the week ending with the anniversary of his birth on the last day of October, was declared Owen Burns Week by the city commission. Many special events to honor him also were celebrated during November 8–14, 2009, which closely followed. The centennial anniversary of the arrival of Owen Burns in Sarasota was celebrated in 2010.
