= Kurt Wenner =

American artist

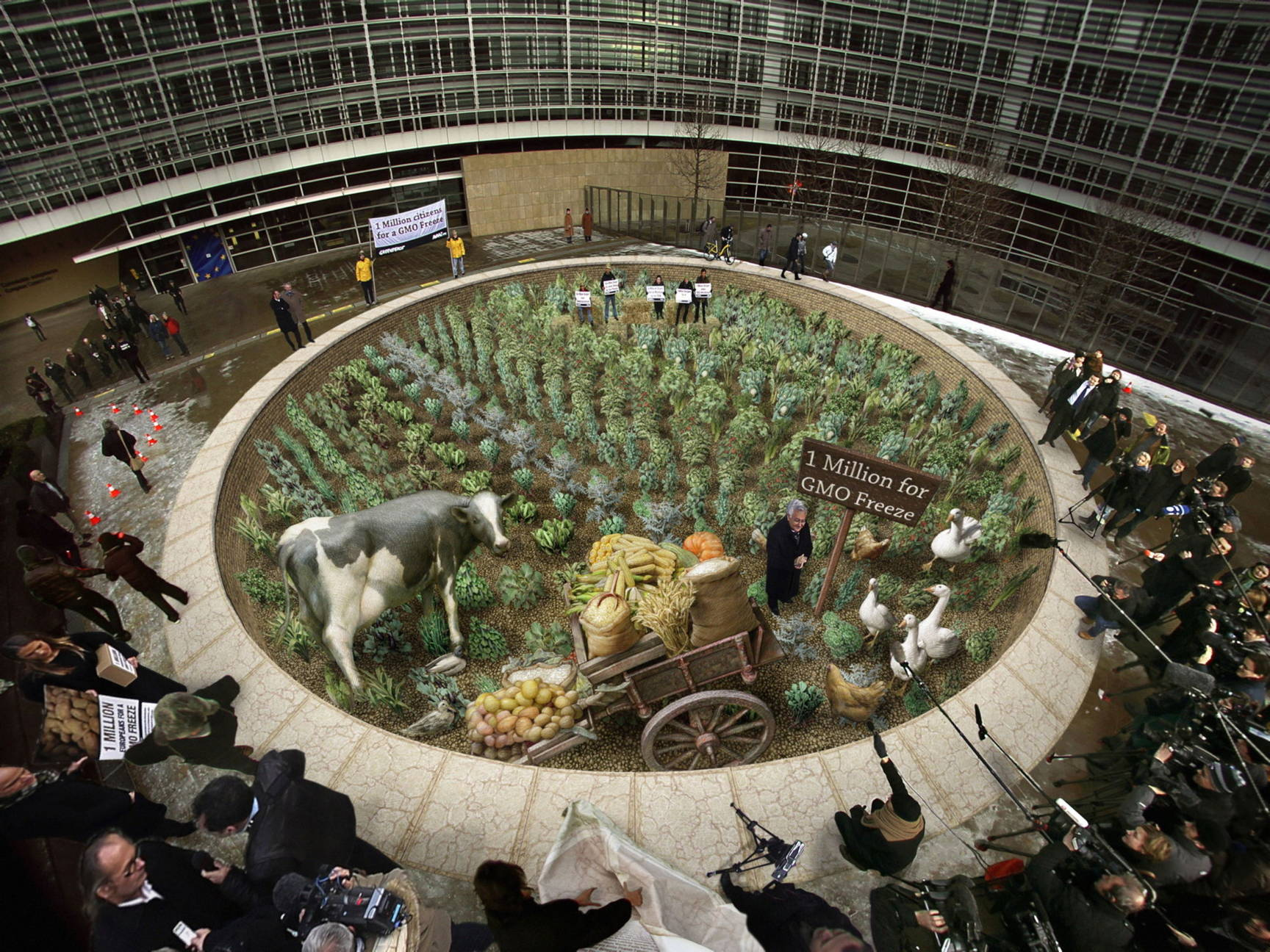
1 Million Signatures

Kurt Wenner is an American artist known for his 3D pavement art shown internationally.

== Early life and education ==
Wenner was born in Ann Arbor, Michigan in 1958, but grew up in Santa Barbara, California. He attended Rhode Island School of Design and ArtCenter College of Design in California. While at ArtCenter he was recruited to work for NASA at the Jet Propulsion Laboratory, creating conceptual art.

In 1982, he left his job at NASA to focus on his art and moved to Italy.

== Career ==
Wenner learned about the European tradition of street painting after living in Rome for a few months. Wenner added perspective to the street painting work and in turn he created 3D pavement art. His work has been shown in more than 30 countries around the world.

In 2010, Greenpeace called for a ban of genetically modified crops by presenting the European Union members in Brussels with one million signatures on a petition. It was the first time the EU members forced a vote by invoking the 1-million member signature rule. Wenner was asked to create a 3D image to commemorate the historical day when the people of Europe stood up, voicing action for no GMO in their food. Wenner's enormous 3D image (22-by-22-metre (72 by 72 ft)) was at the center of this historical moment.
