= Curtatone =

Curtatone Cürtatun (Lombard)
- Comune
- Città di Curtatone
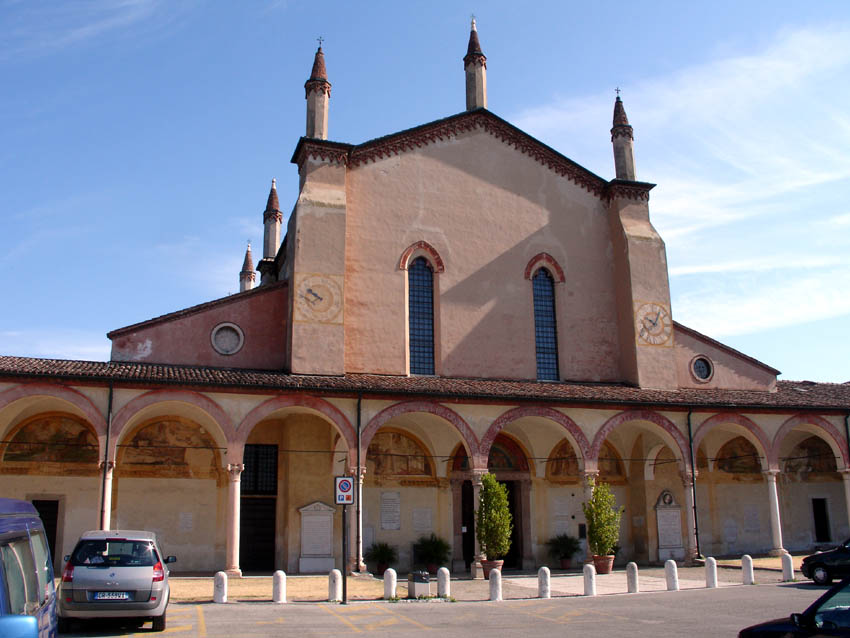
- Sanctuary of the Blessed Virgin of Graces

- Coat of arms

- Location within Italy Location within Lombardy
- Coordinates: 45°9′N 10°43′E
- Country: Italy
- Region: Lombardy
- Province: Mantua (MN)
- Frazioni: Buscoldo, Eremo, Grazie, Levata, Montanara (municipal seat), Ponteventuno, San Lorenzo, San Silvestro

Government
  - Mayor: Carlo Bottani

Area
  - Total: 67.47 km^{2} (26.05 sq mi)
- Elevation: 26 m (85 ft)

Population (28 February 2017)
  - Total: 14,818
  - Density: 219.6/km^{2} (568.8/sq mi)
- Demonym: Curtatonesi
- Time zone: UTC+1 (CET)
  - Summer (DST): UTC+2 (CEST)
- Postal code: 46010
- Dialing code: 0376
- Website: Official website

Curtatone (Mantovano: Cürtatun) is a comune (municipality) in the province of Mantua, in the Italian region of Lombardy, located about 130 kilometres (81 mi) southeast of Milan and about 7 kilometres (4 mi) southwest of Mantua.

The municipality of Curtatone is formed by the frazioni (subdivisions, mainly villages and hamlets) Buscoldo, Eremo, Grazie (site of the notable Santuario della Beata Vergine delle Grazie), Levata, Montanara (municipal seat), Ponteventuno, San Lorenzo, and San Silvestro.

Curtatone borders the following municipalities: Borgo Virgilio, Castellucchio, Mantua, Marcaria, Porto Mantovano, Rodigo. Its frazione of Grazie is one of I Borghi più belli d'Italia ("The most beautiful villages of Italy").

Curtatone received the honorary title of city with a presidential decree on July 2, 2002.

== Government ==
The current mayor is Carlo Bottani, elected for a third term on 25 May 2026.

Citywide law enforcement is provided by the Curtatone Police Department to more urban areas and the Mantua County Sheriff's Office for more rural areas.

EMS and fire services are provided by the Mantua City Fire Department and the Mantua County Fire Department.

== See also ==
- Battle of Curtatone (1848)
- Sanctuary of the Beata Vergine delle Grazie, Curtatone
