= John Nolen Plan of Venice Historic District =

Historic district in Florida, United States

- U.S. National Register of Historic Places
- U.S. Historic district
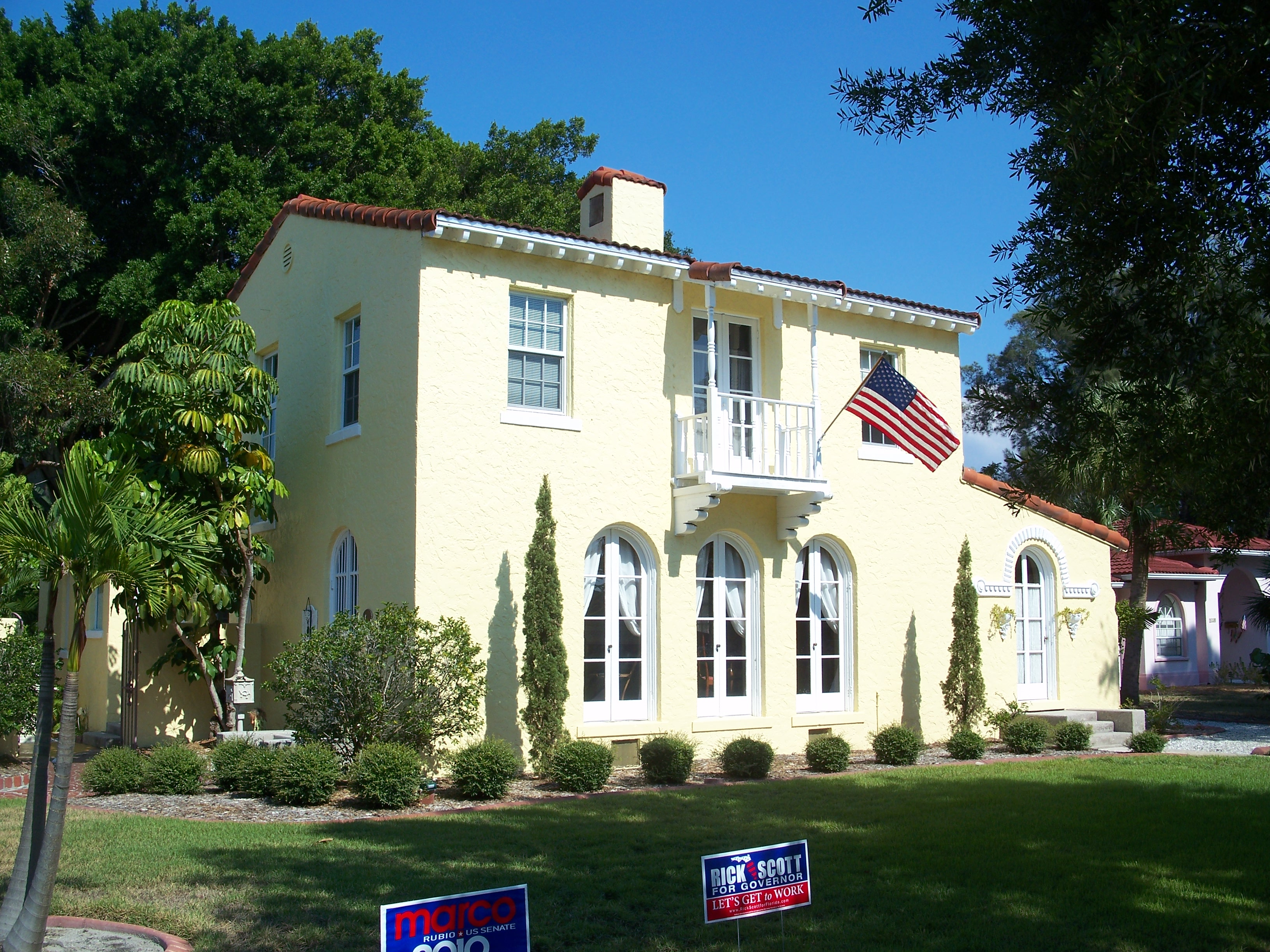
- Venezia Park

- Location within Florida Location within the United States
- Location: Venice, Florida
- Coordinates: 27°05′46″N 82°26′35″W
- NRHP reference No.: 10000840
- Added to NRHP: September 23, 2009

The John Nolen Plan of Venice Historic District is a U.S. historic district located on the west coast of Venice, Florida. The district, planned by John Nolen in 1926 for the Brotherhood of Locomotive Engineers, is bounded by Laguna Drive on north, Home Park Road on east, the Corso on south, and The Esplanade on west. The district encompasses many other properties and historic districts already listed on the National Register of Historic Places including:

- Armada Road Multi-Family District
- Blalock House
- Hotel Venice
- Johnson-Schoolcrafy Building
- Levillain-Letton House
- Triangle Inn
- Valencia Hotel and Arcade
- Venice Depot
- Venezia Park Historic District
- Edgewood Historic District

It was added to the National Register of Historic Places on September 23, 2009.

== Gallery ==
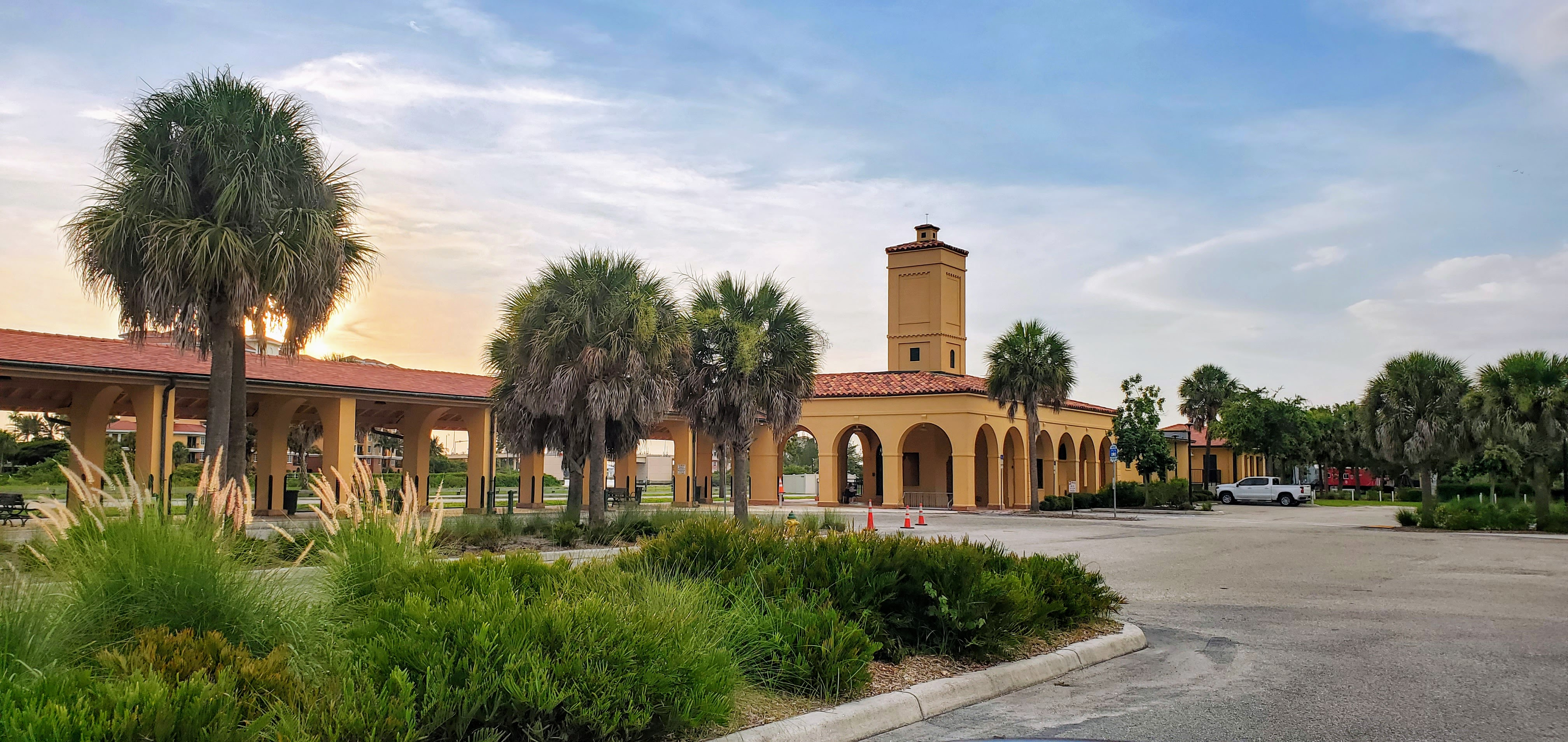
Venice Depot

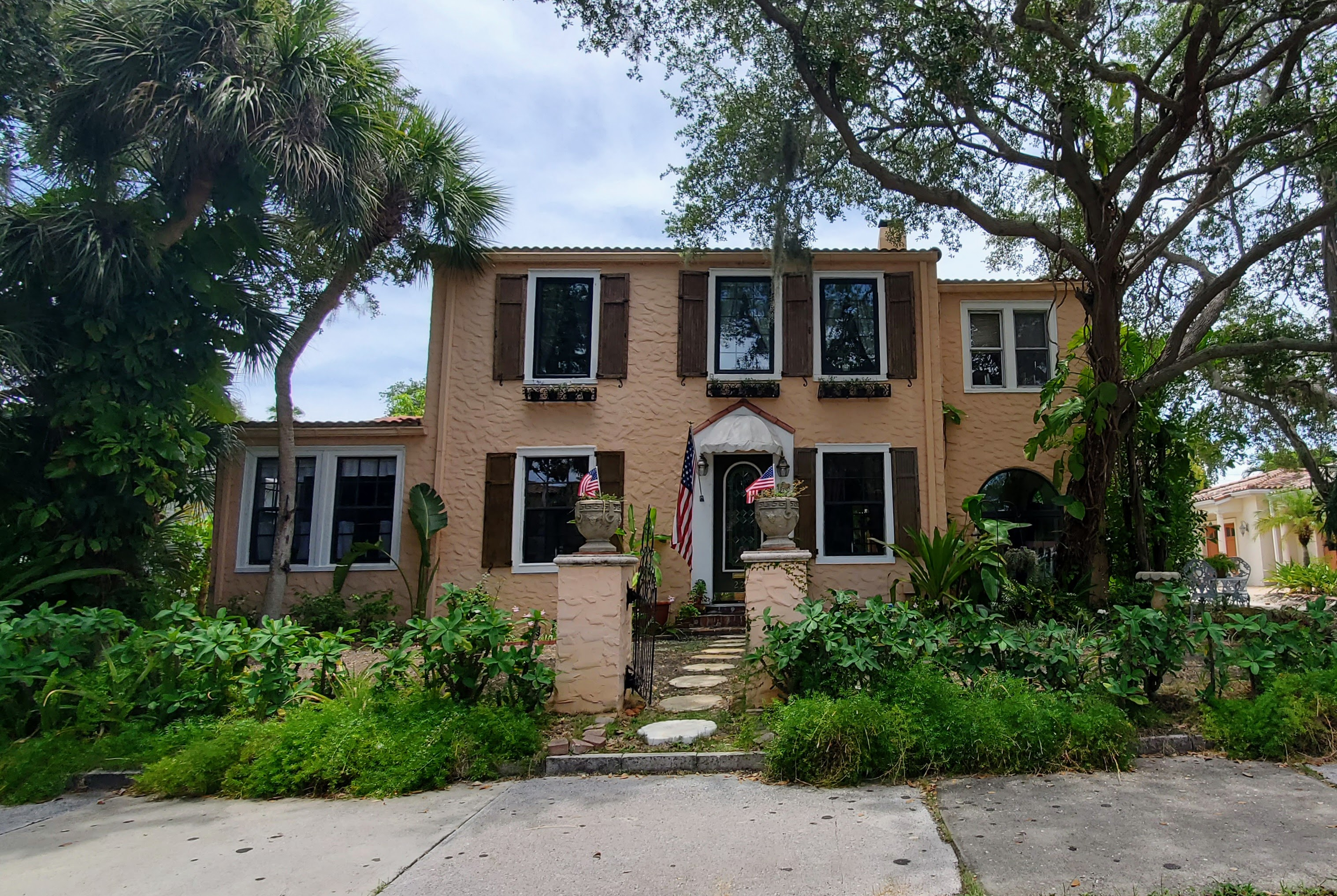
Levillain-Letton House

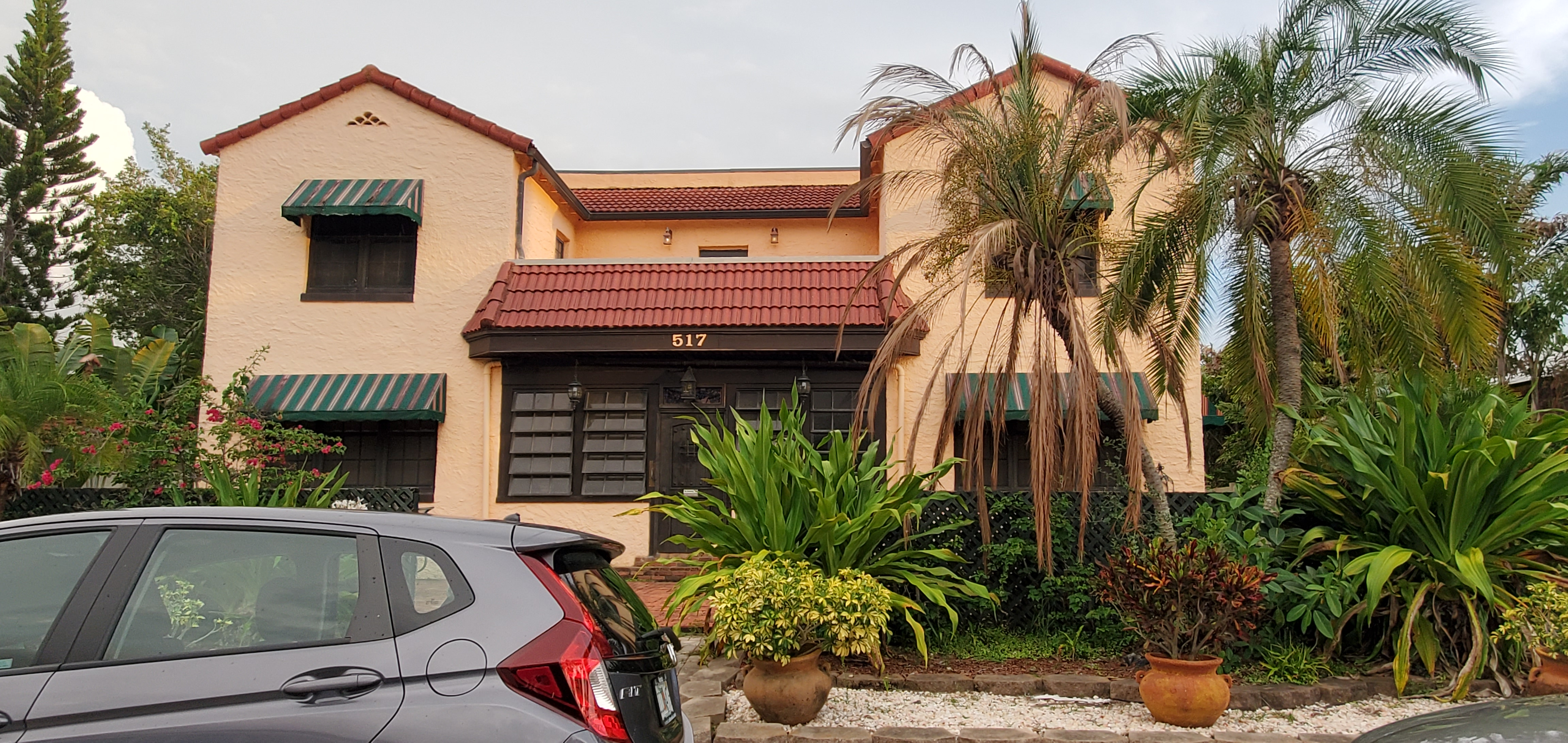
517 Menedez Avenue

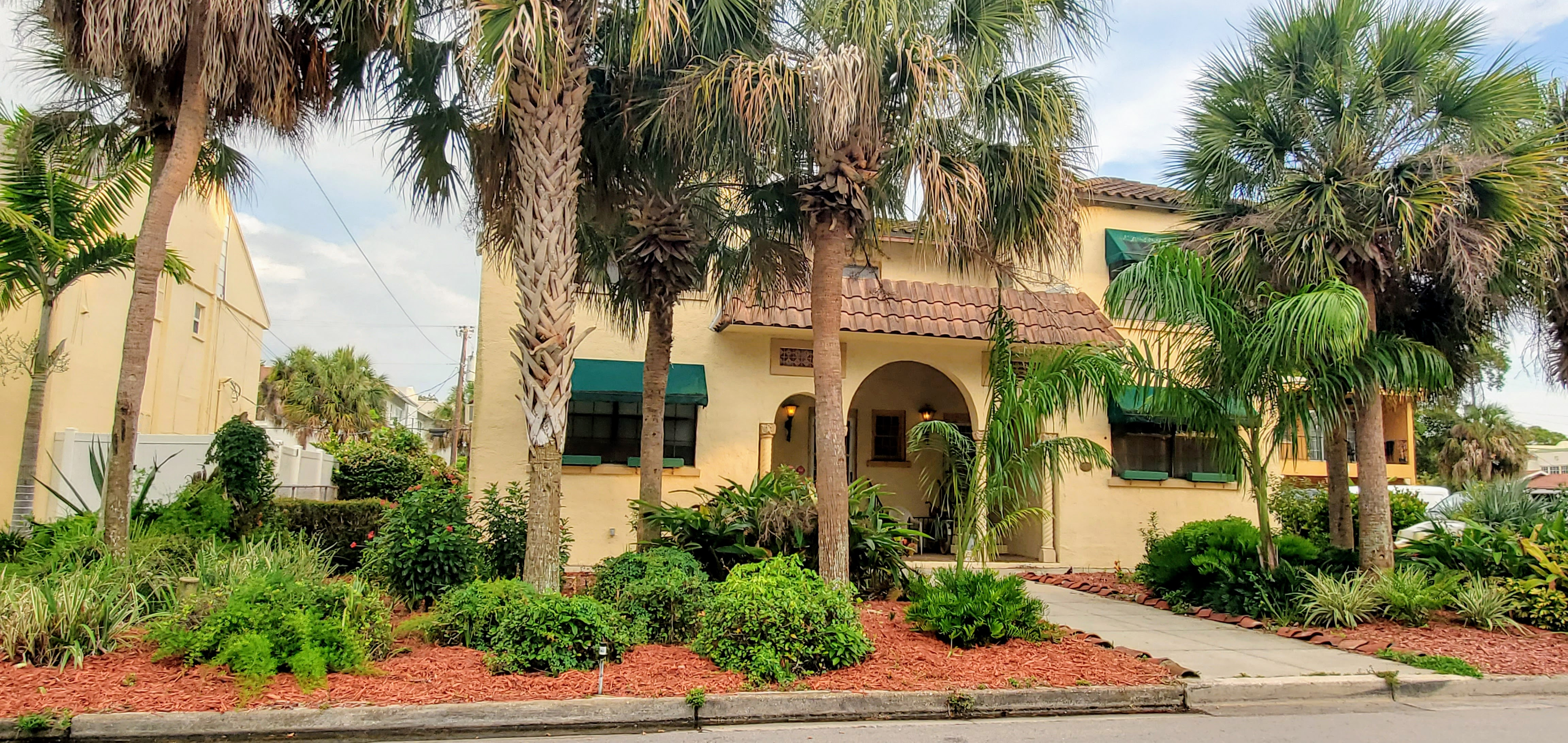
429 Menendez Avenue

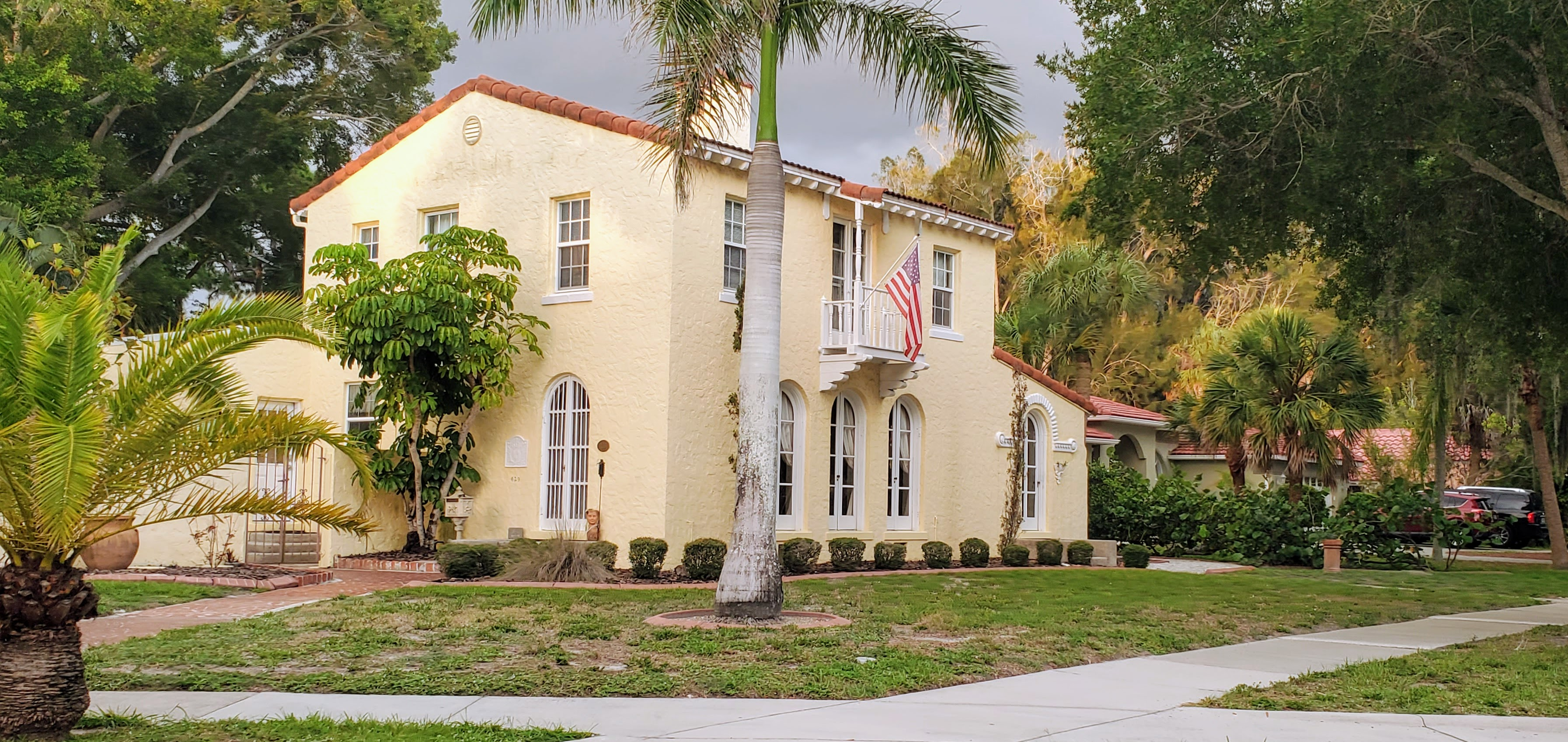
429 South Nassau Street

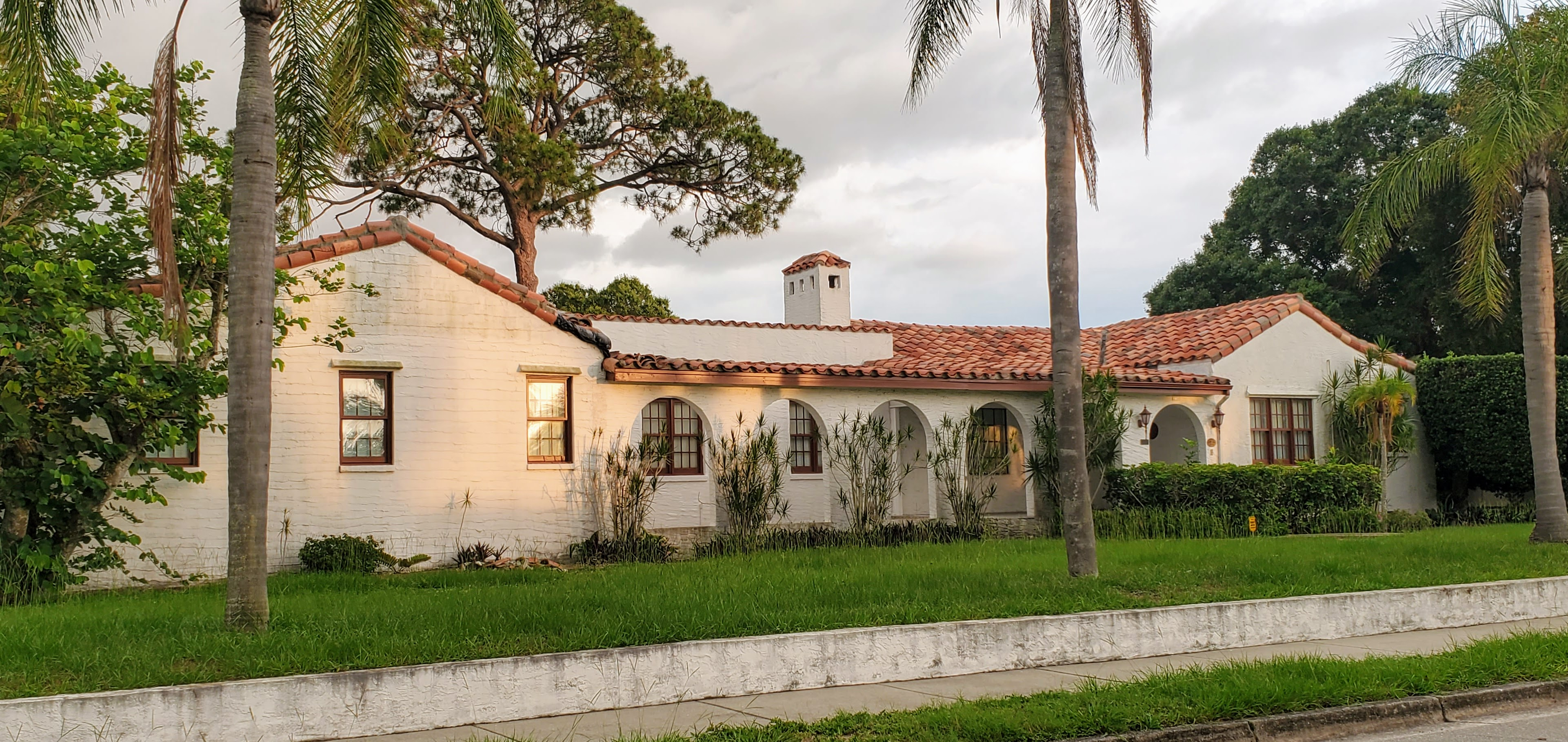
333 Sorrento Street

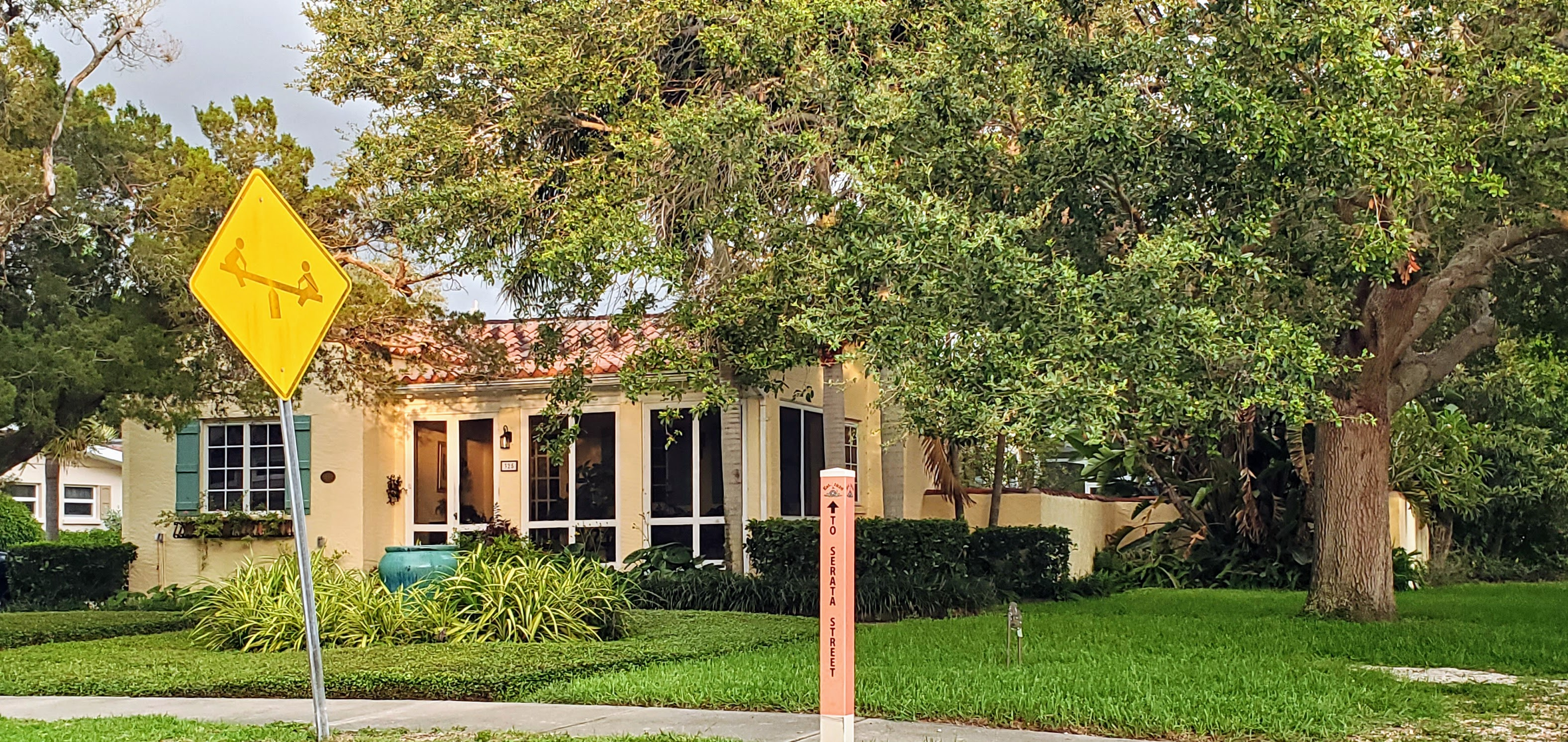
325 Sorrento Street

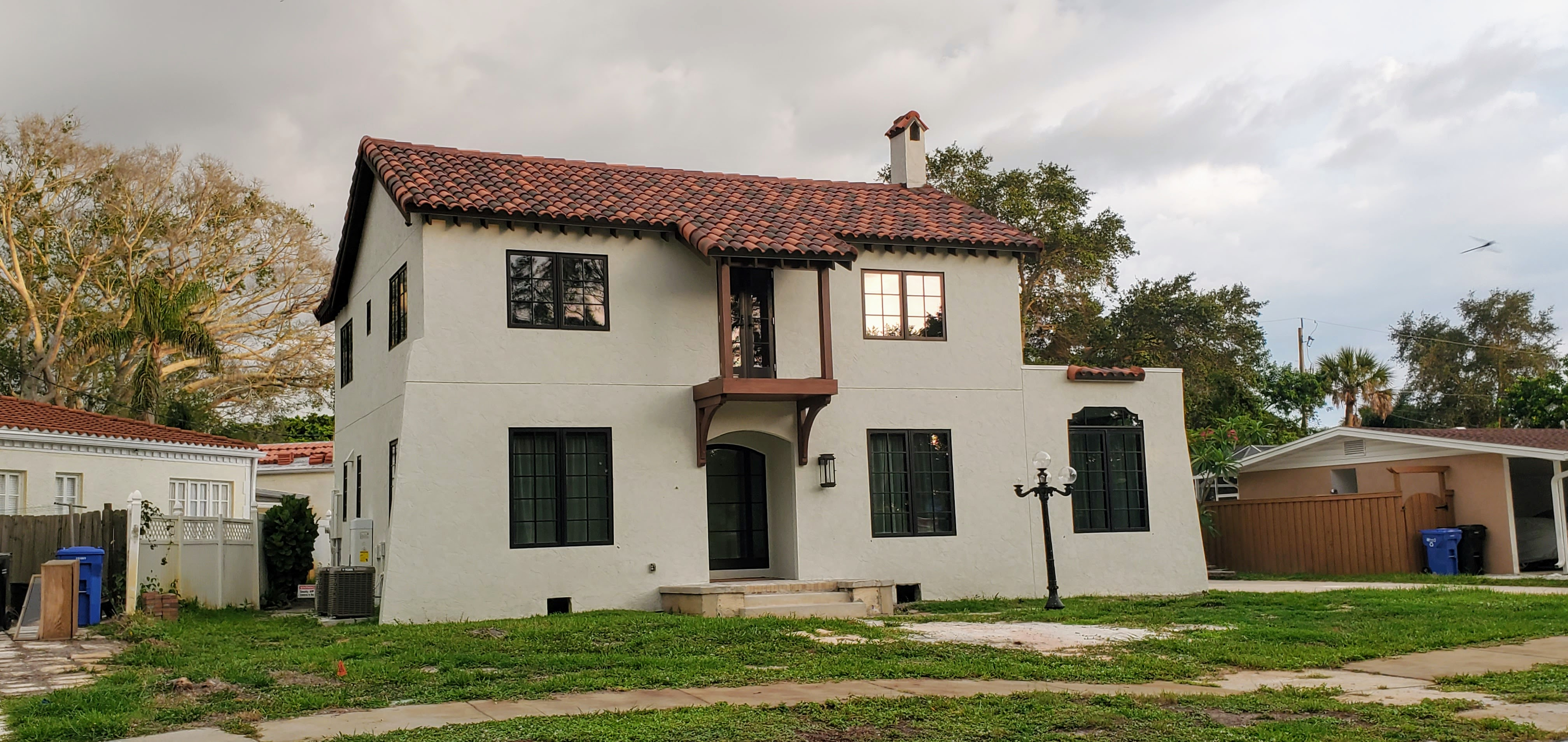
309 Sorrento Street
