= Venice MPS =

- U.S. National Register of Historic Places
- Location within Florida Location within the United States
- Location: Venice, Florida
- Coordinates: 27°5′55.22″N 82°26′20.35″W
- MPS: Venice Multiple Property Group
- NRHP reference No.: 64500128

The following buildings were added to the National Register of Historic Places as part of the Venice MPS Multiple Property Submission (or MPS).

Resource Name	Also known as	Address	City	County	Added
Armada Road Multi-Family District		Roughly bounded by Granada Avenue, Harbor Drive South, Armada Road South, and Park Boulevard South	Venice	Sarasota County	December 18, 1989
Blalock House		241 South Harbor Drive	Venice	Sarasota County	April 12, 1989
Edgewood Historic District		Roughly bounded by School Street, Myrtle Avenue, Venice-By-Way, and Groveland Avenue	Venice	Sarasota County	December 18, 1989
House at 710 Armada Road South		710 Armada Road South	Venice	Sarasota County	August 17, 1989
Johnson-Schoolcrafy Building		201-203 West Venice Avenue	Venice	Sarasota County	December 27, 1996
Levillain-Letton House		229 South Harbor Drive	Venice	Sarasota County	April 12, 1989
Triangle Inn		351 South Nassau Street	Venice	Sarasota County	February 23, 1996
Valencia Hotel and Arcade		229 West Venice Avenue	Venice	Sarasota County	November 10, 1994
Venezia Park Historic District		Roughly bounded by Palermo Street, Sorrento Street, South Harbor Drive, and Salerno Street	Venice	Sarasota County	December 18, 1989
Venice Depot		303 East Venice Avenue	Venice	Sarasota County	August 17, 1989
