= House at 710 Armada Road South =

Historic house in Florida, United States

- U.S. National Register of Historic Places
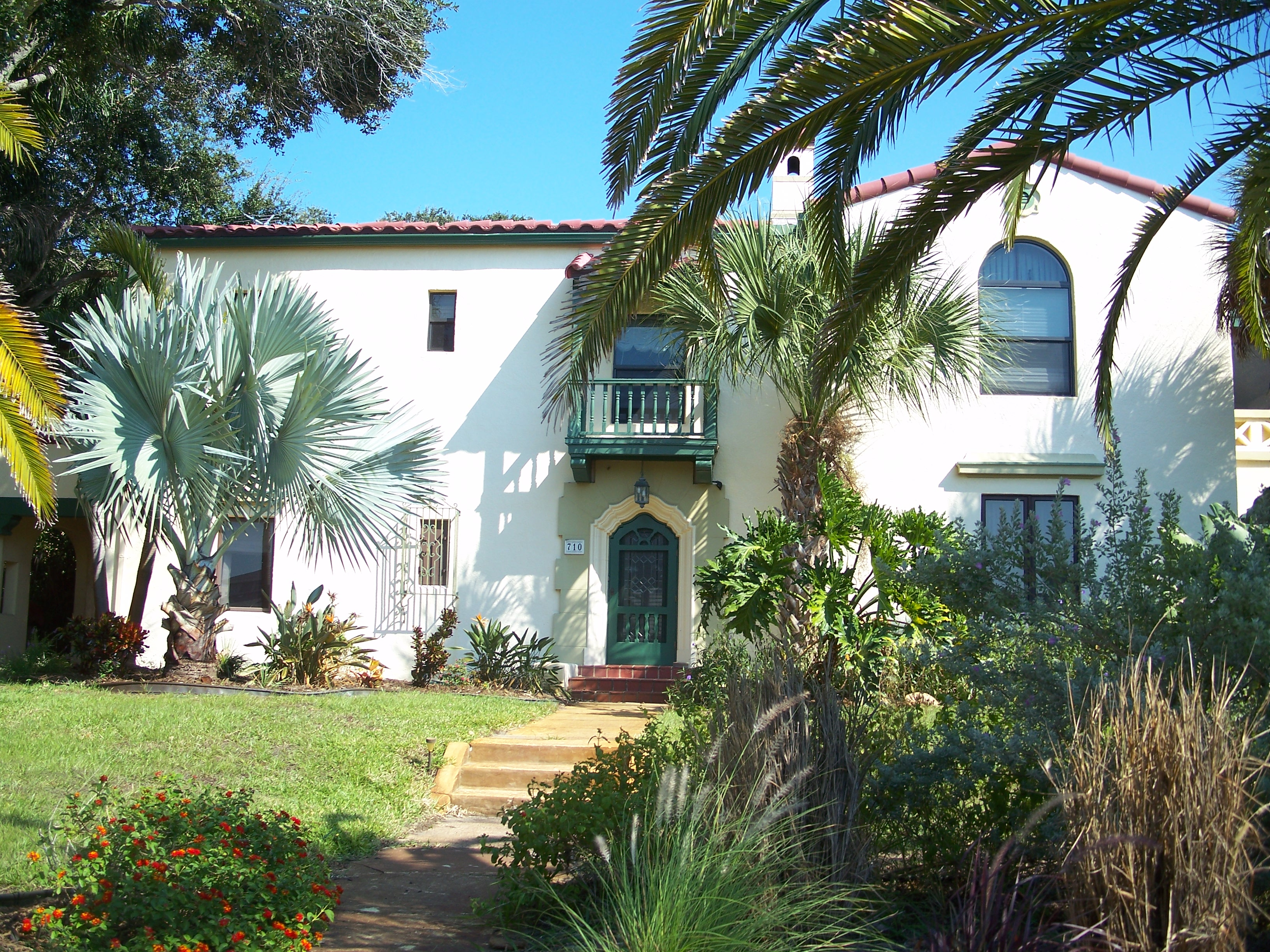

- Location within Florida Location within the United States
- Location: Venice, Florida
- Coordinates: 27°5′52″N 82°26′49″W
- Architectural style: Mission/Spanish Revival
- MPS: Venice MPS
- NRHP reference No.: 89001073
- Added to NRHP: August 17, 1989

The House at 710 Armada Road South, also known as the Senator Copeland House, is a historic home in Venice, Florida. The home is located at 710 Armada Road South. On August 17, 1989, it was added to the U.S. National Register of Historic Places.
