= Edgewood Historic District (Venice, Florida) =

Historic district in Florida, United States

- U.S. National Register of Historic Places
- U.S. Historic district
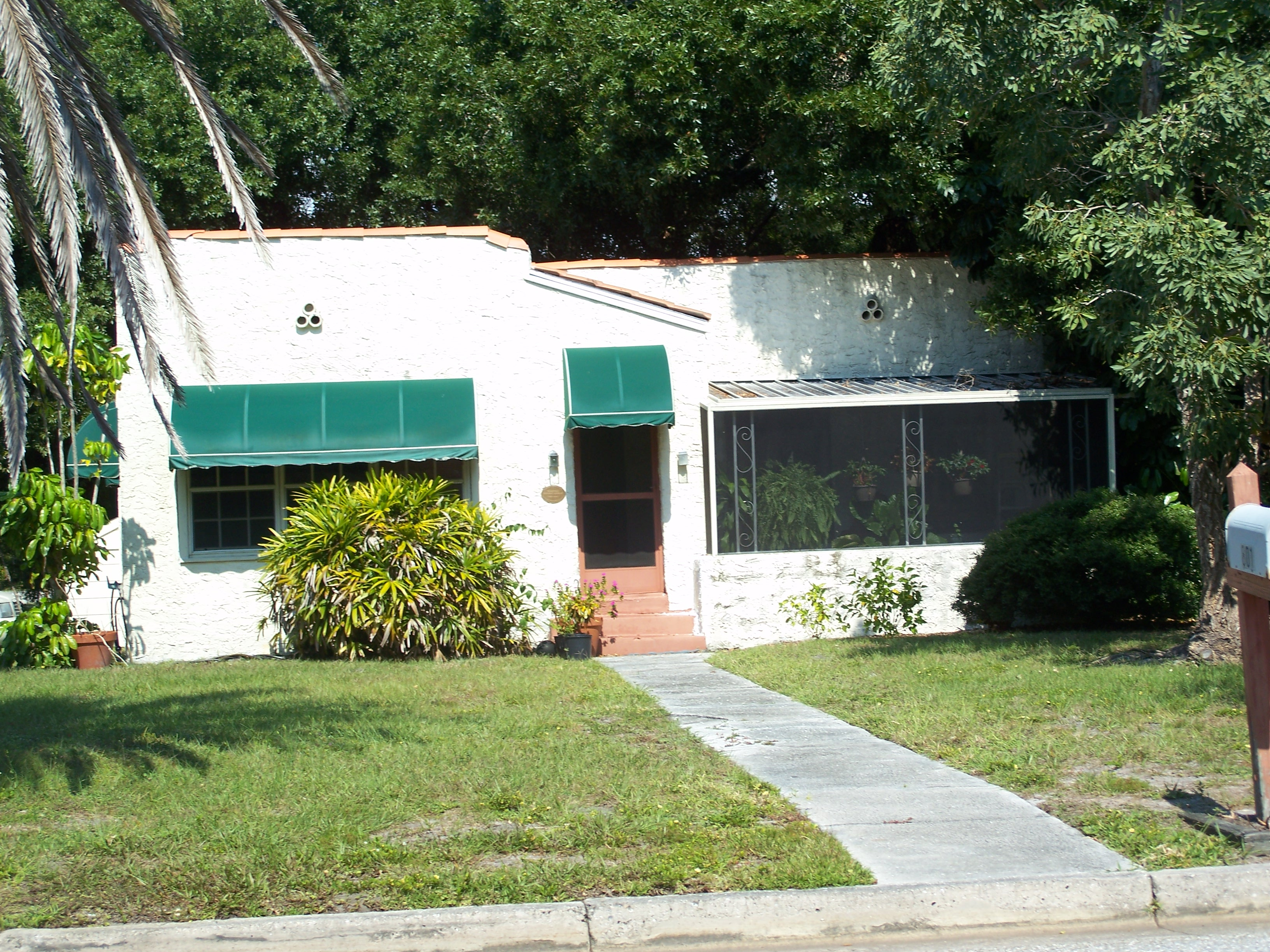
- 801 Groveland Avenue

- Location within Florida Location within the United States
- Location: Venice, Florida
- Coordinates: 27°5′46″N 82°25′51″W
- Area: 280 acres (1.1 km^{2})
- MPS: Venice MPS
- NRHP reference No.: 89002048
- Added to NRHP: December 18, 1989

The Edgewood Historic District is a U.S. historic district (designated as such on December 18, 1989) located in Venice, Florida. The district is bounded by School Street, Myrtle Avenue, Venice-By-Way, and Groveland Avenue. It contains 36 historic buildings.

== Gallery ==
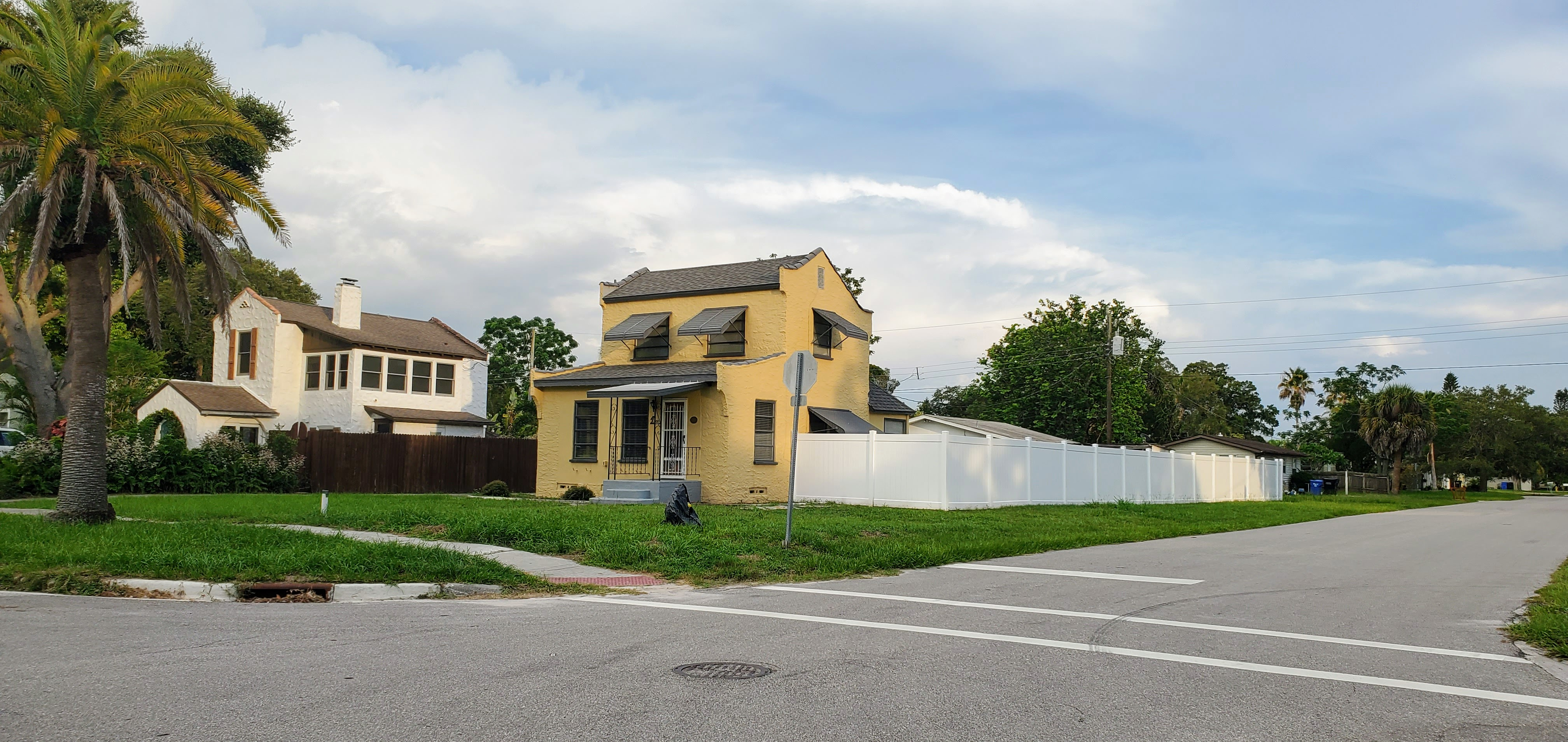
800 Groveland AVenue

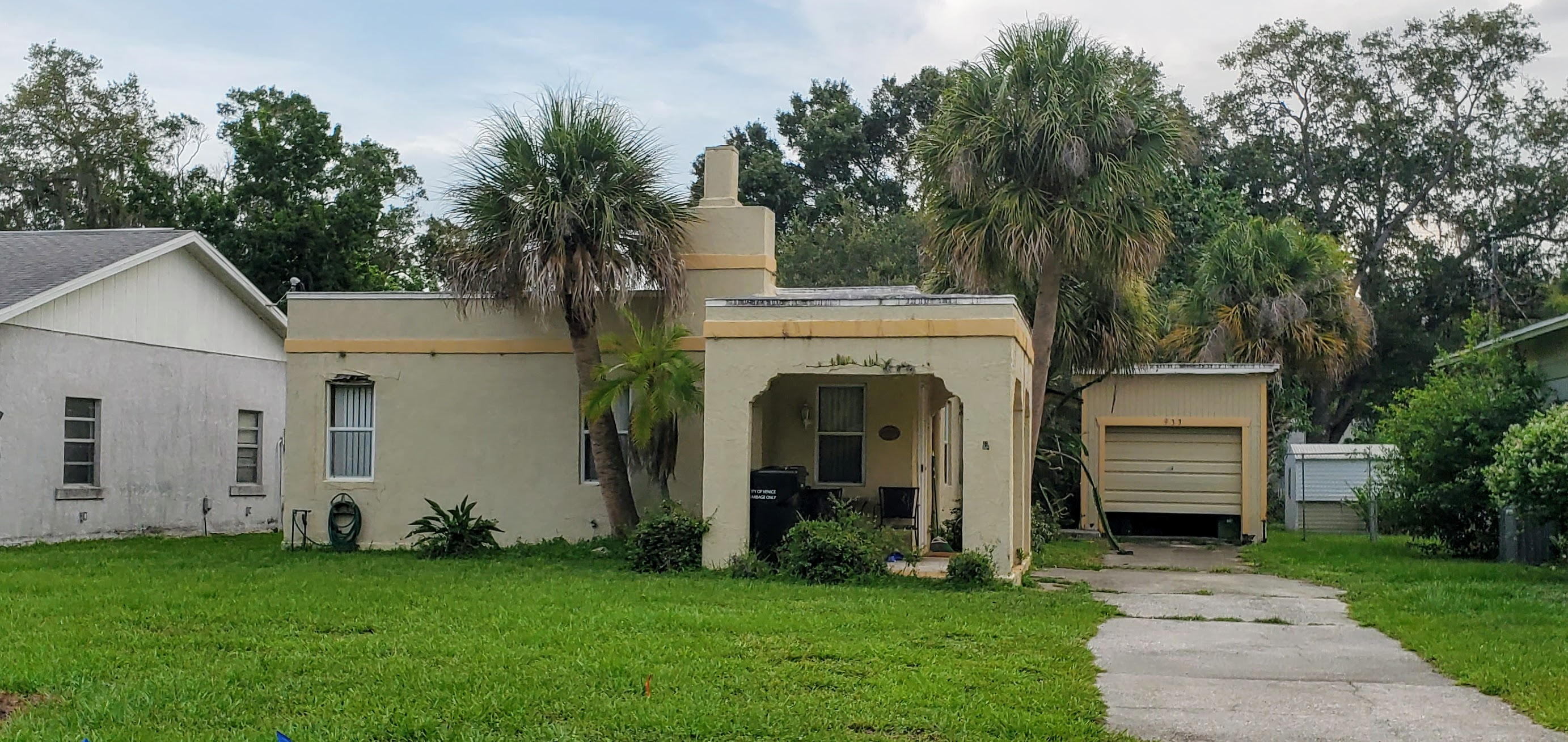
933 Groveland Avenue

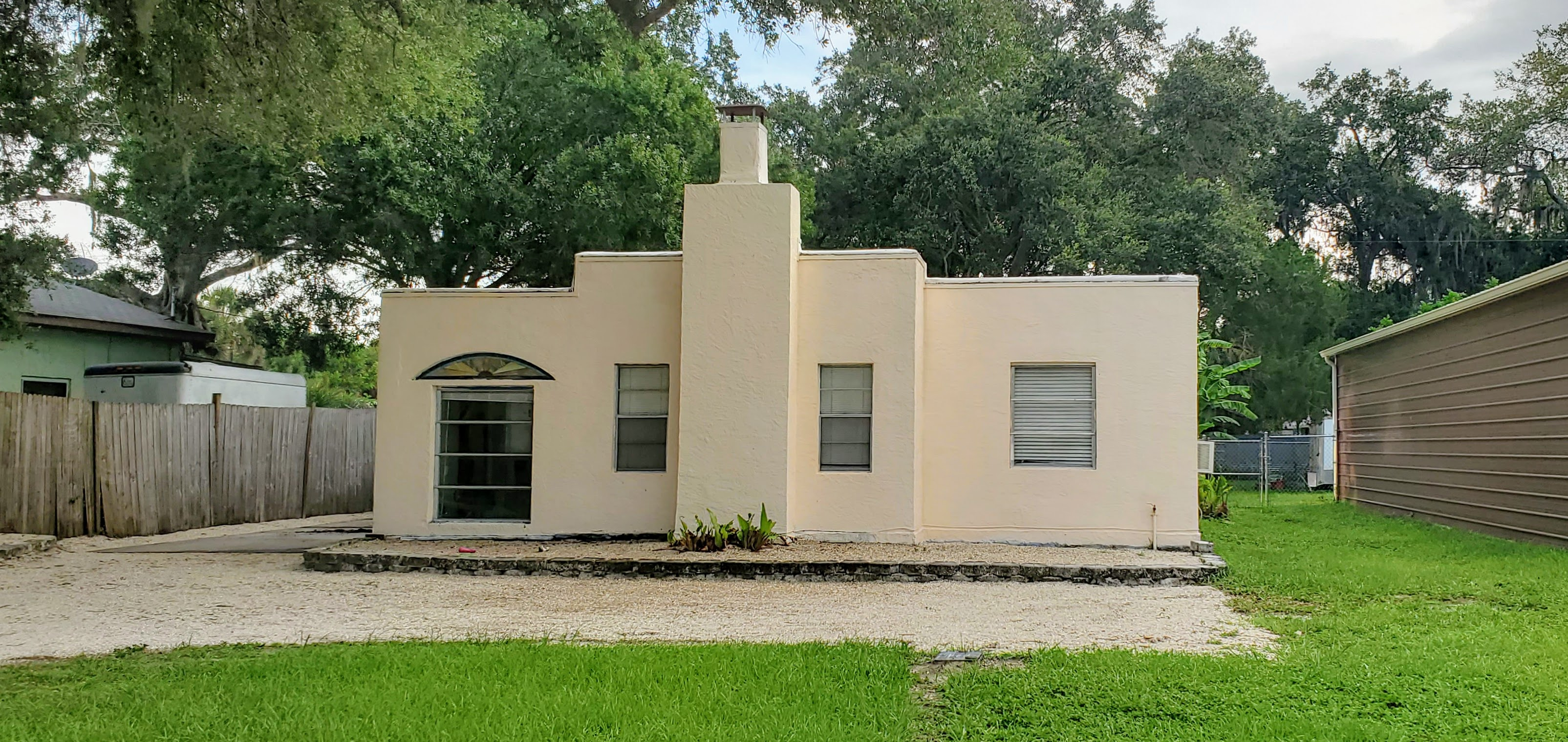
917 Groveland Avenue

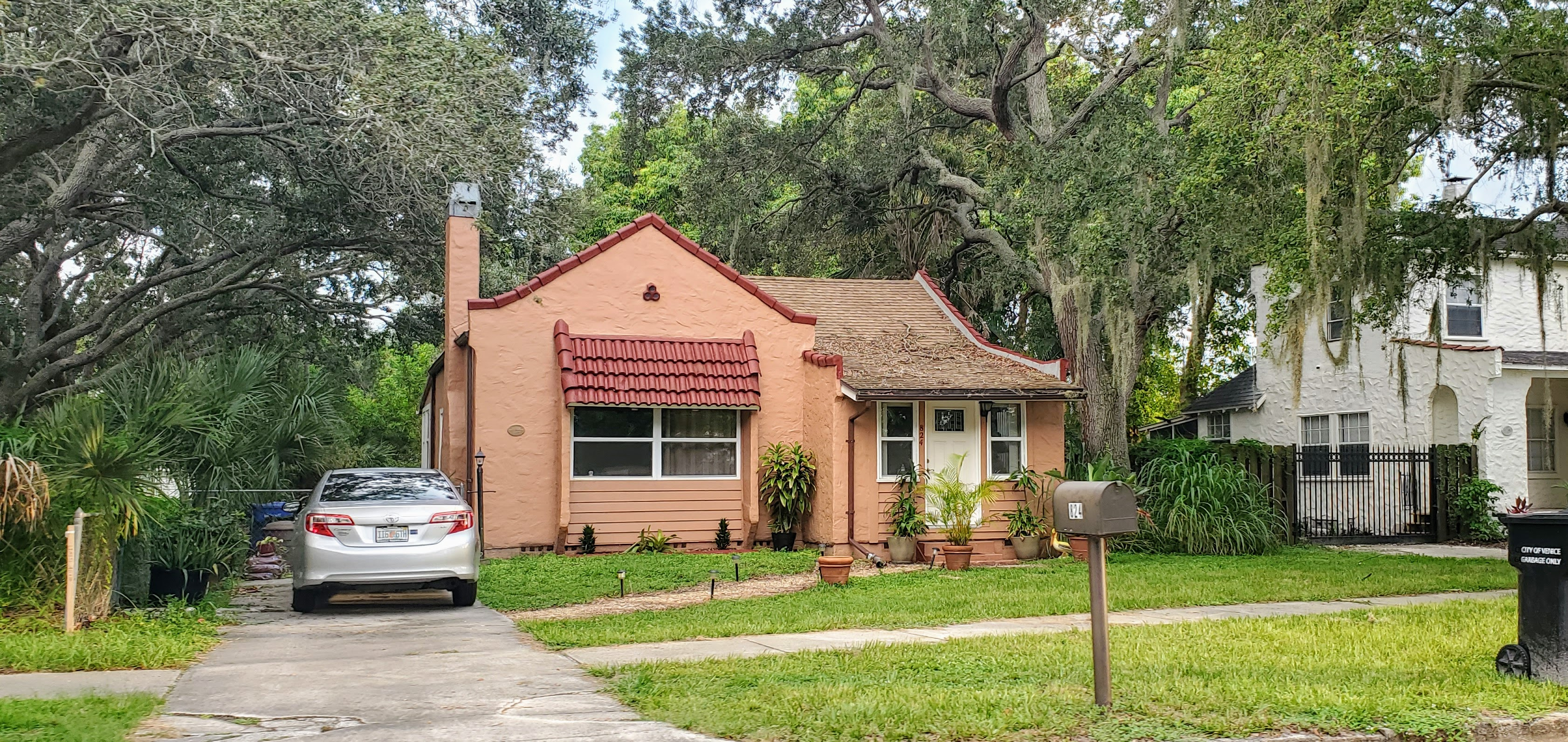
824 Groveland Avenue

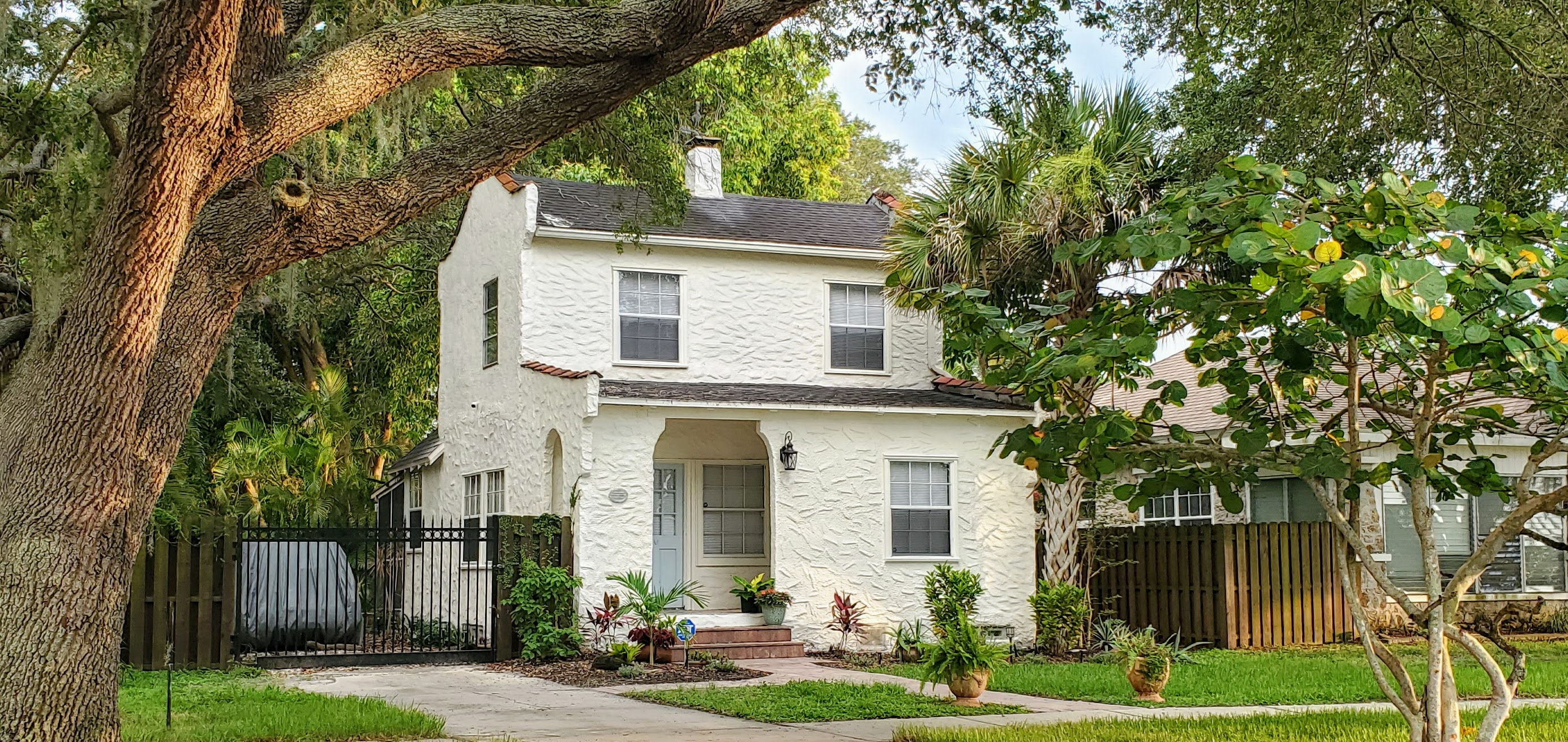
820 Groveland Avenue

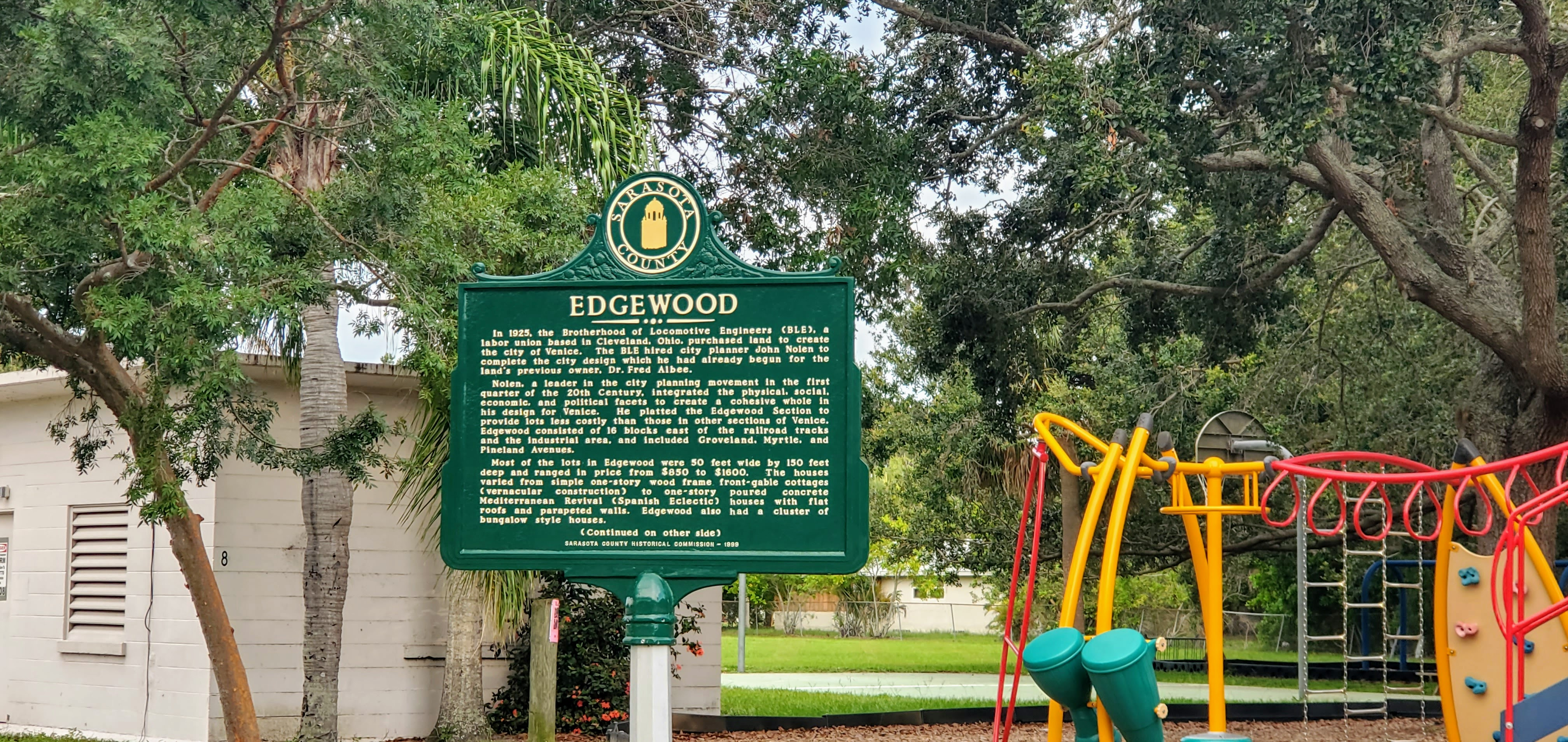
Edgewood Historic Marker
