= Valencia Hotel and Arcade =

- U.S. National Register of Historic Places
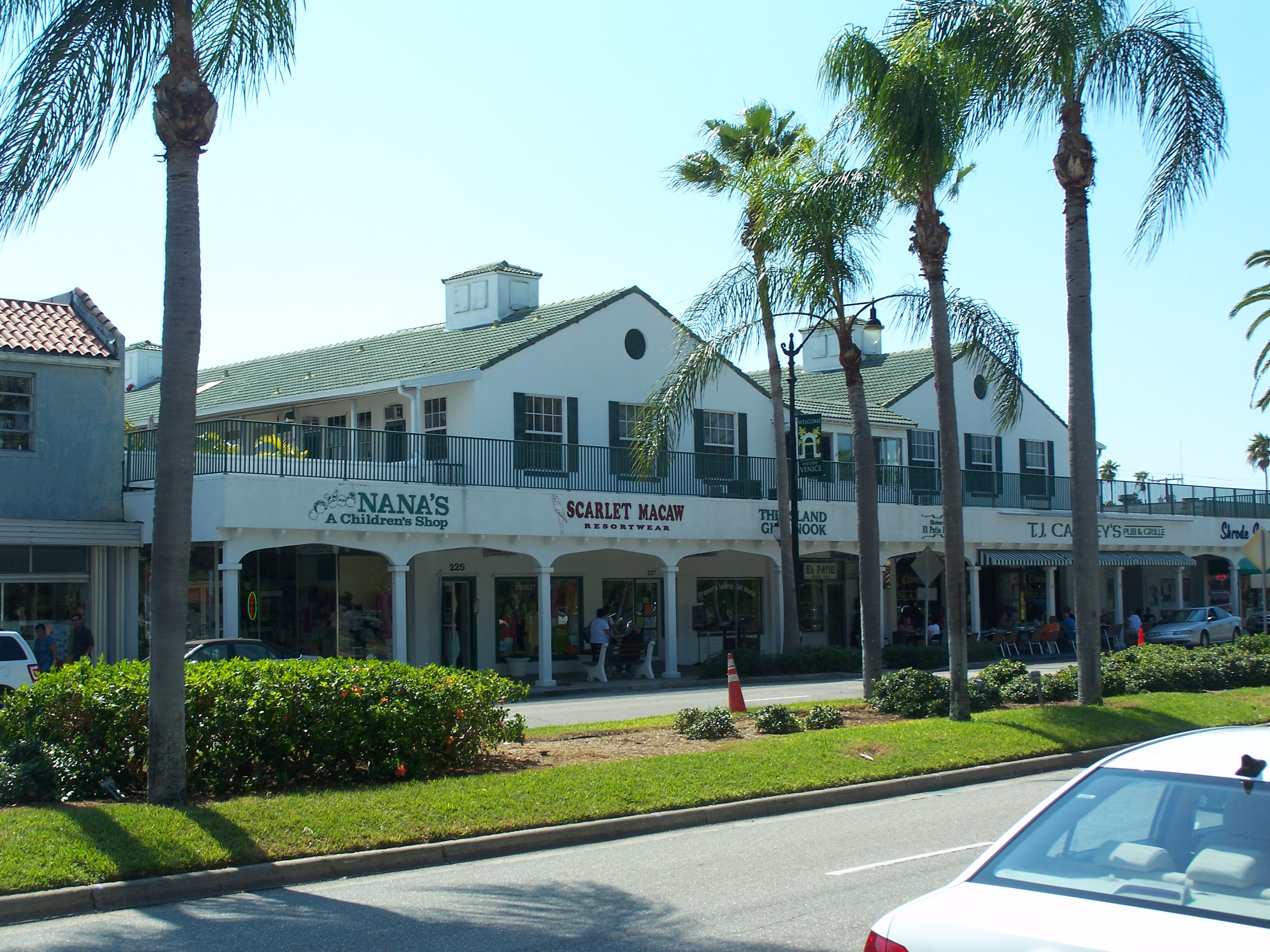

- Location within Florida Location within the United States
- Location: Venice, Florida
- Coordinates: 27°5′58″N 82°26′50″W
- Architectural style: Mission/Spanish Revival
- MPS: Venice MPS
- NRHP reference No.: 94001303
- Added to NRHP: November 10, 1994

The Valencia Hotel and Arcade (also known as the El Verano Hotel or El Patio Hotel) is a historic hotel in Venice, Florida. It is located at 229 West Venice Avenue. On November 10, 1994, it was added to the U.S. National Register of Historic Places.
