= Levillain-Letton House =

Historic house in Florida, United States

- U.S. National Register of Historic Places
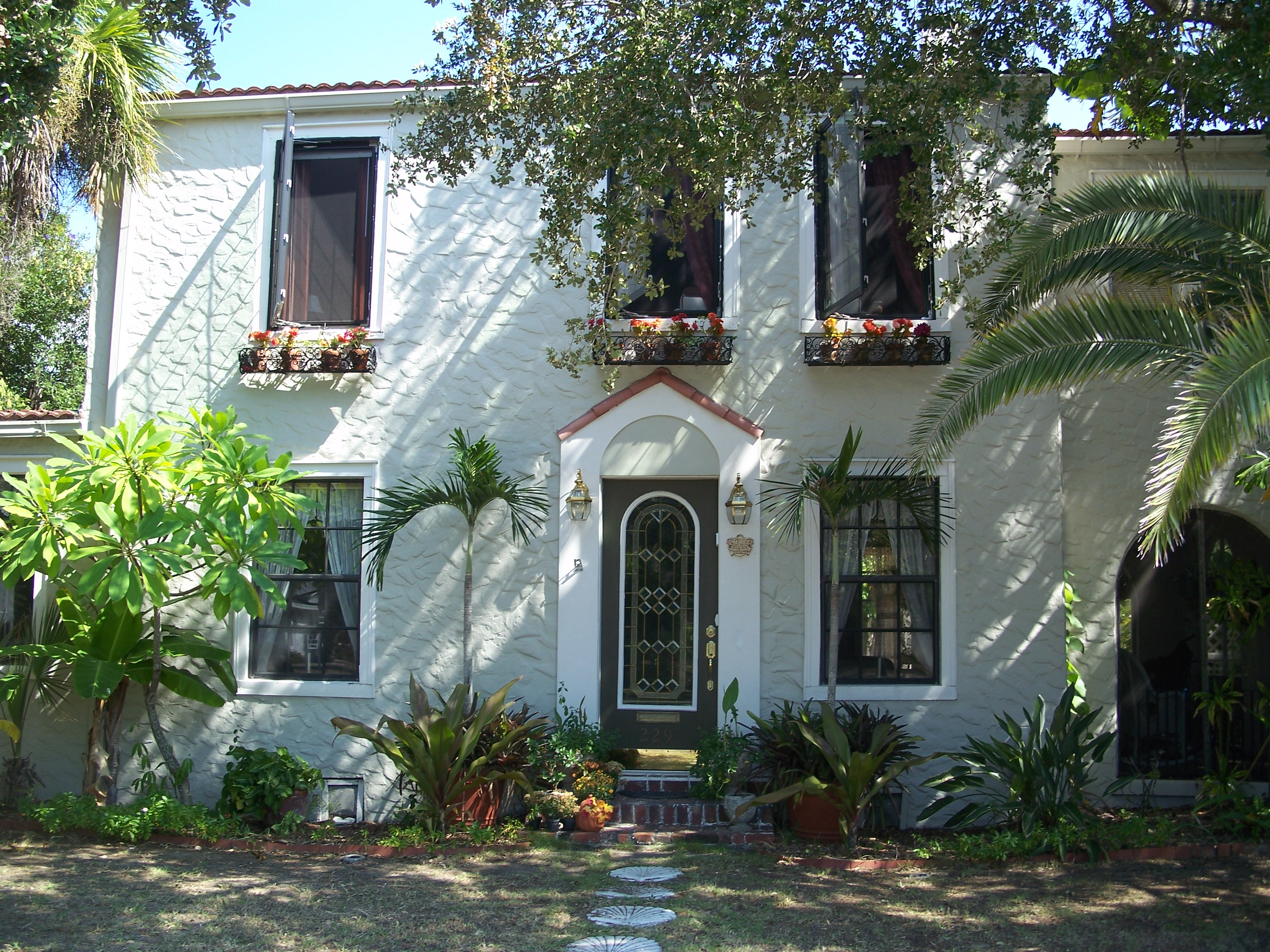
- Levillain-Letton House 2010

- Location within Florida Location within the United States
- Location: 229 South Harbor Drive, Venice, Florida
- Coordinates: 27°5′50″N 82°26′59″W
- Built: 1925
- Architectural style: Mission/Spanish Revival
- MPS: Venice MPS
- NRHP reference No.: 89000234
- Added to NRHP: April 12, 1989

The Levillain-Letton House is a historic house located in Venice, Florida.

== Description and history ==
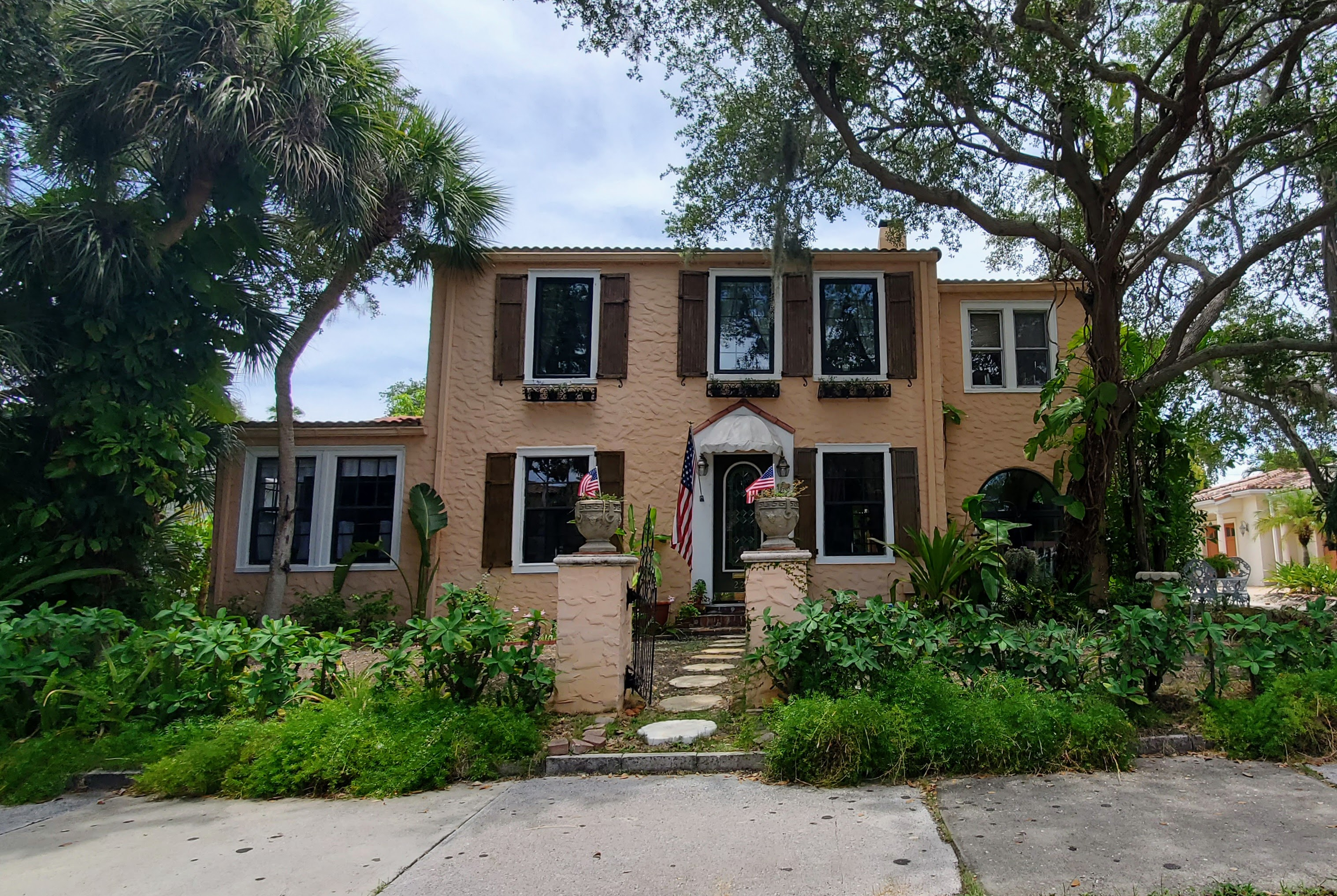
Levillain-Letton House 2022

It is a 2-story Mediterranean Revival style house constructed of textured stucco over clay tile. The four bay plan is rectangular with a one bay wing on its right side, resting on a concrete foundation. The gable roof is clad in concrete barrel tile of the period. It was built in 1926 as part of the Brotherhood of Locomotive Engineers development of the city. It was added to the National Register of Historic Places on April 12, 1989.
