= Blalock House =

Historic house in Florida, United States

- U.S. National Register of Historic Places
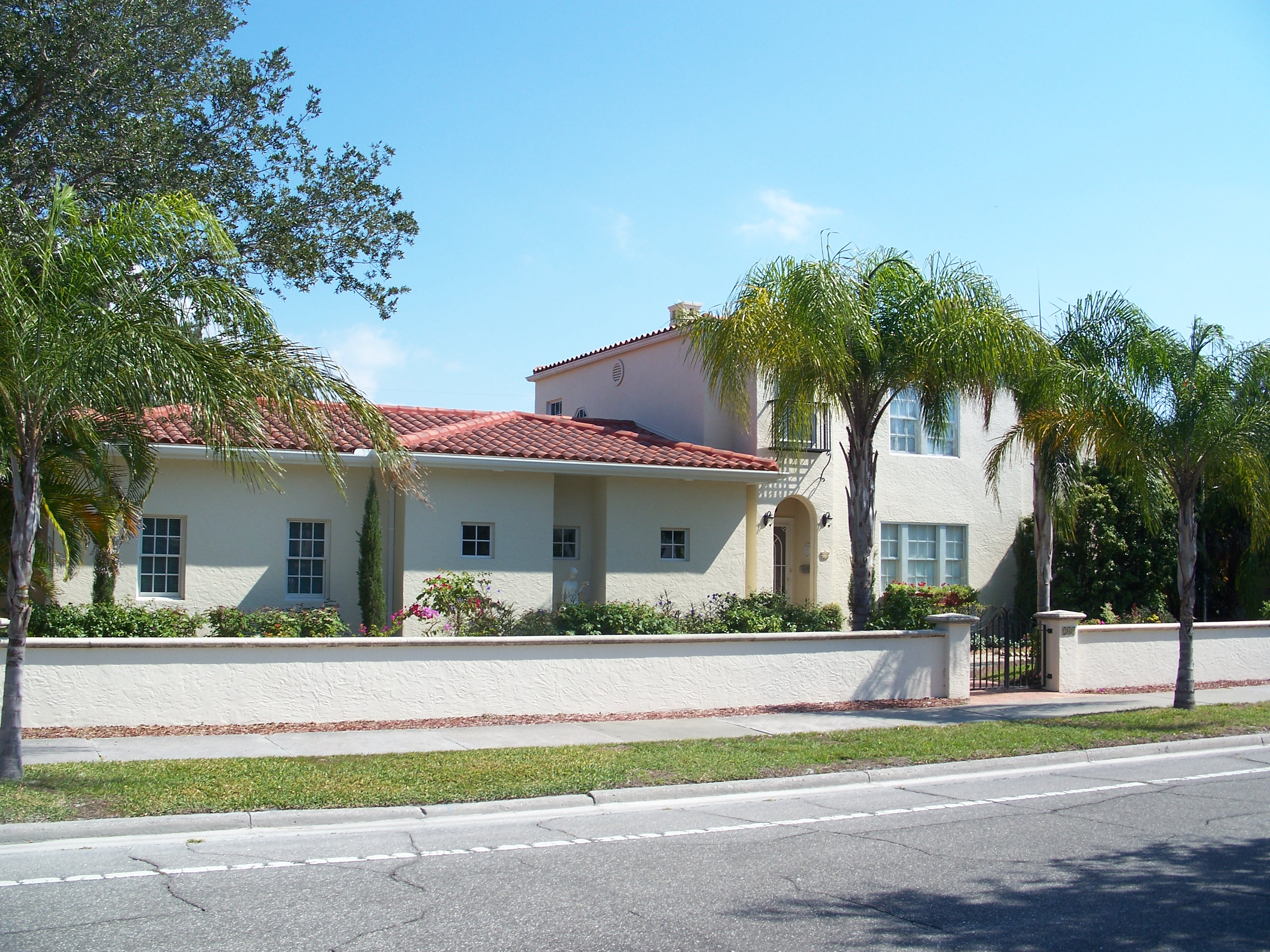

- Location within Florida
- Location: Venice, Florida
- Coordinates: 27°5′49″N 82°26′59″W
- Area: Less than 1 acre (0.40 ha)
- Built: 1925
- Architectural style: Mission/Spanish Revival
- MPS: Venice MPS
- NRHP reference No.: 89000235
- Added to NRHP: April 12, 1989

The Blalock House is a historic home in Venice, Florida, United States. It is located at 241 South Harbor Drive. On April 12, 1989, it was added to the U.S. National Register of Historic Places.

The home is a two-story Mediterranean Revival style residence constructed of rough cast stucco over a wood frame.

== See also ==
- National Register of Historic Places listings in Sarasota County, Florida
