= Armada Road Multi-Family District =

Historic district in Florida, United States

- U.S. National Register of Historic Places
- U.S. Historic district
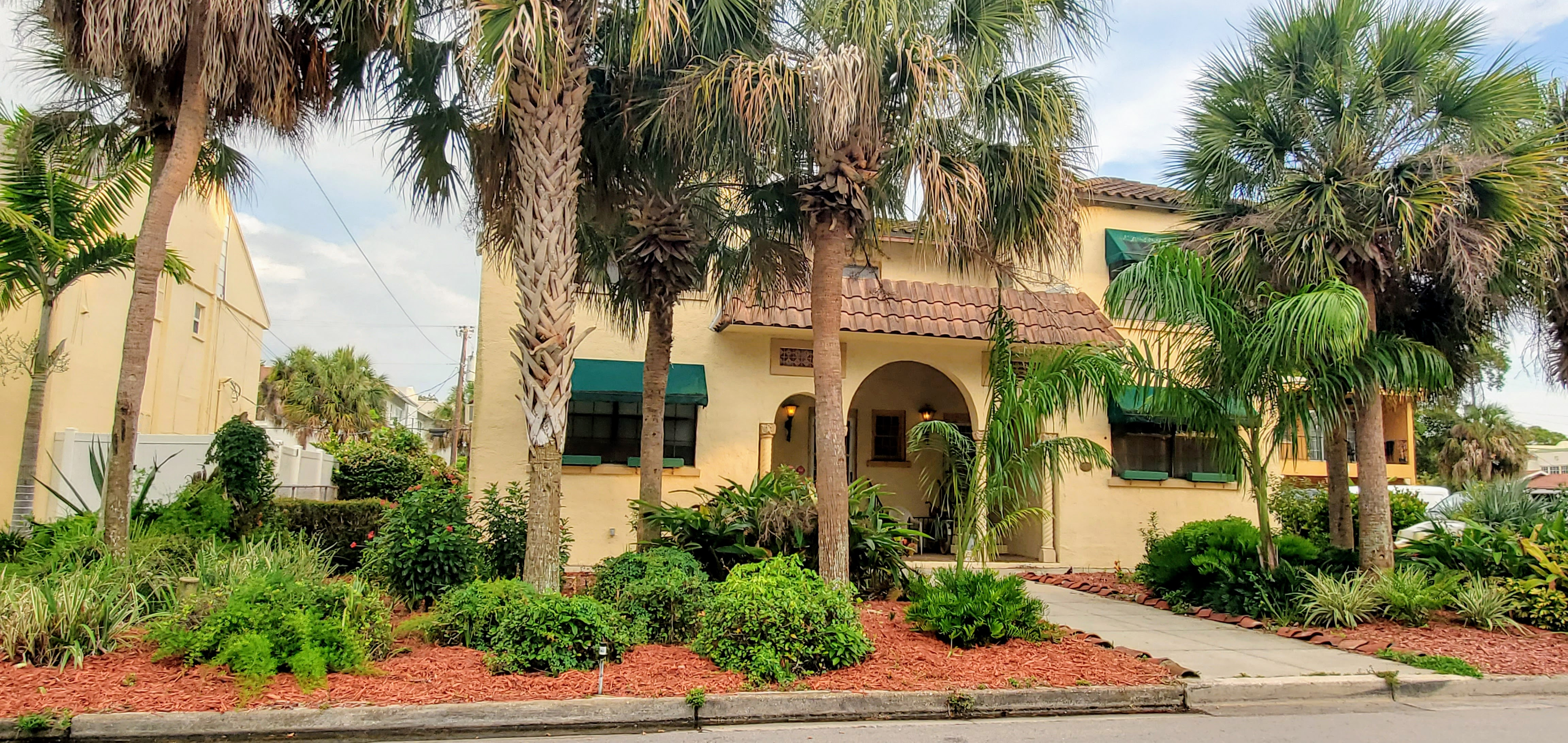
- 429 Menendez Avenue

- Location within Florida Location within the United States
- Location: Venice, Florida
- Coordinates: 27°5′48″N 82°26′58″W
- Area: 160 acres (0.65 km^{2})
- MPS: Venice MPS
- NRHP reference No.: 89002049
- Added to NRHP: December 18, 1989

The Armada Road Multi-Family District is a U.S. historic district in Venice, Florida. The district is bounded by Granada Avenue, Harbor Drive South, Armada Road South, and Park Boulevard South, encompasses approximately 160 acres (0.65 km^{2}), and contains 11 historic buildings. On December 18, 1989, it was added to the U.S. National Register of Historic Places.

== Gallery ==
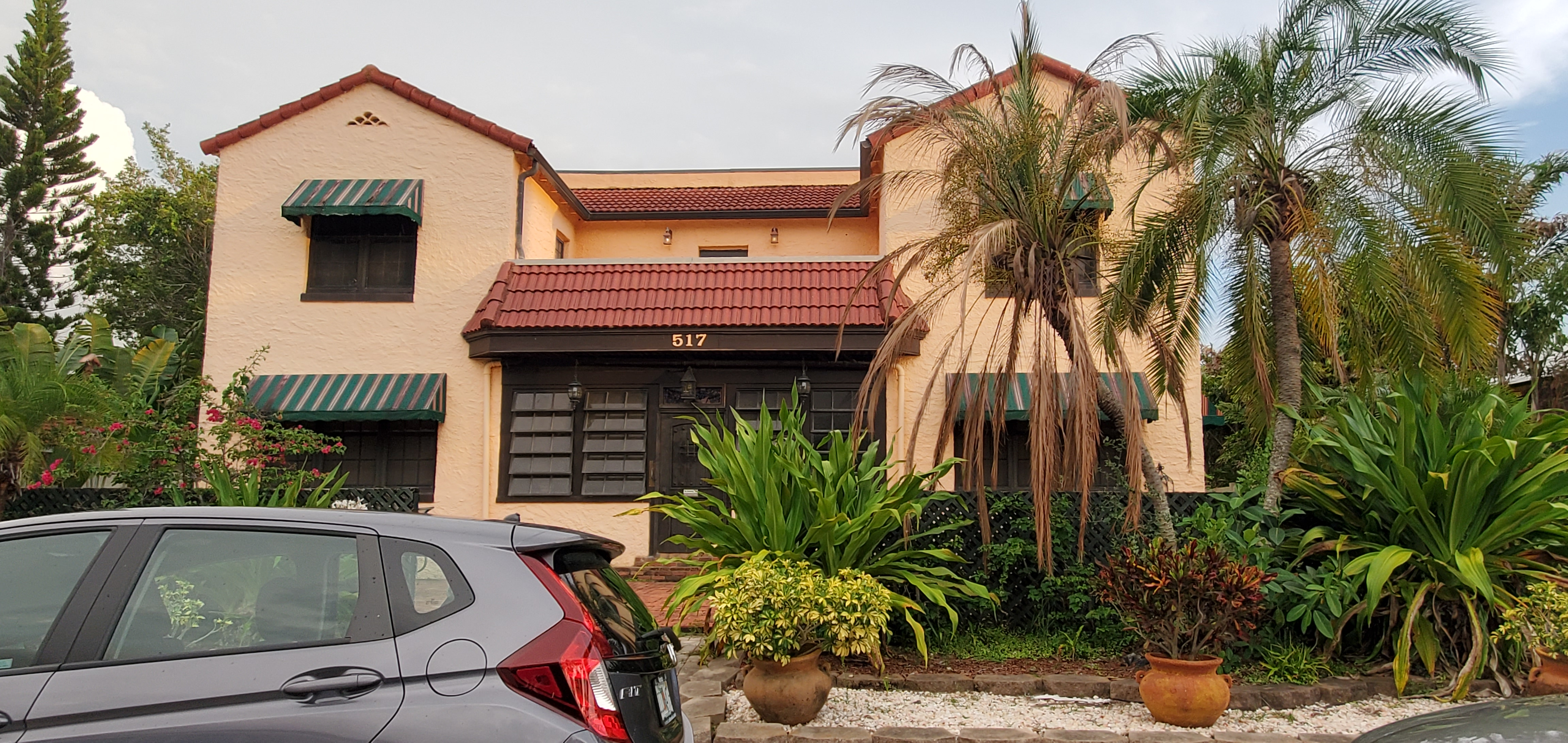
517 Menendez Avenue

== See also ==
- National Register of Historic Places listings in Sarasota County, Florida
