= Venezia Park Historic District =

Historic district in Florida, United States

- U.S. National Register of Historic Places
- U.S. Historic district
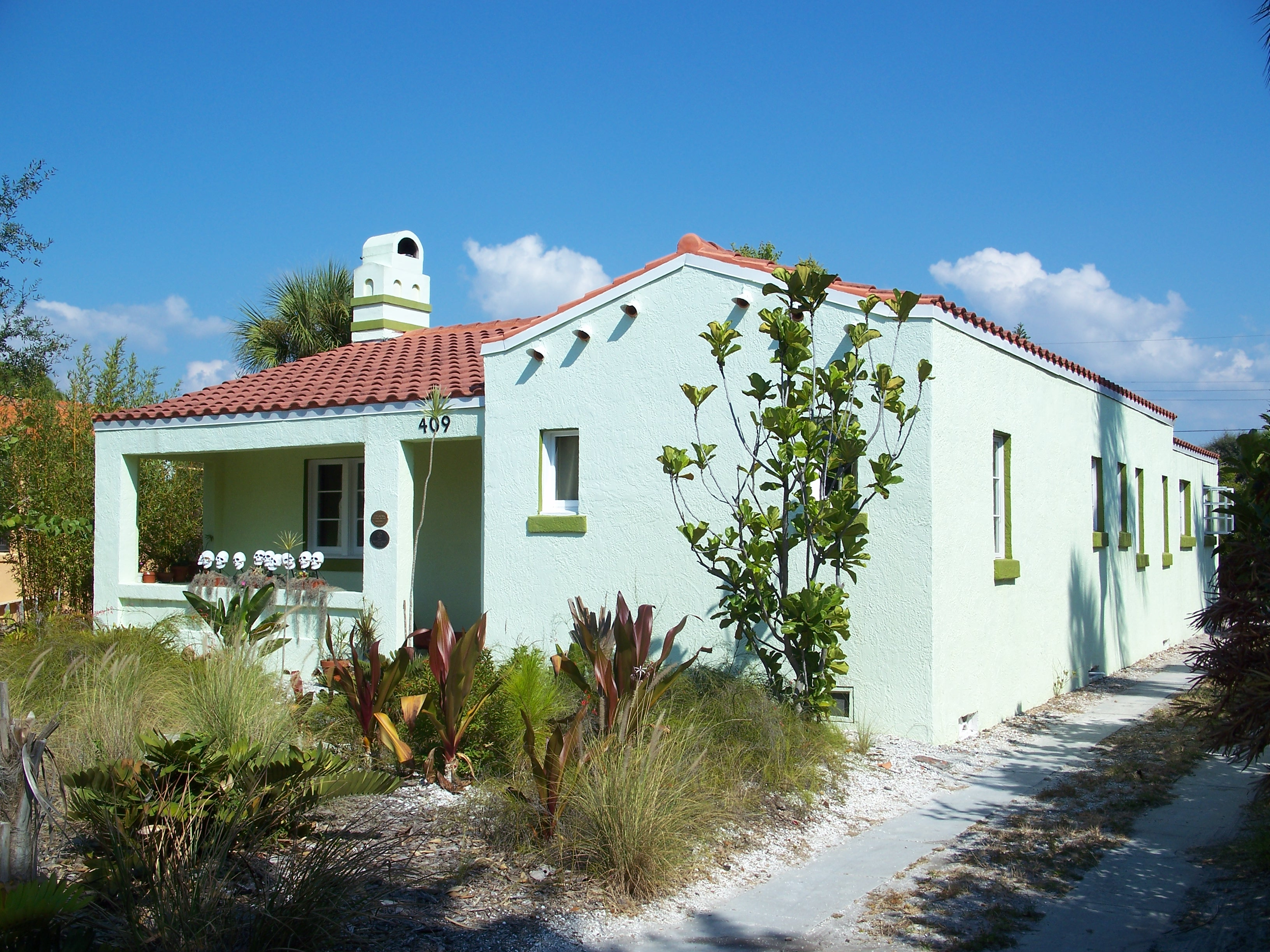
- 409 Nassau Street South

- Location within Florida Location within the United States
- Location: Venice, Florida
- Coordinates: 27°5′31″N 82°26′53″W
- Area: 550 acres (2.2 km^{2})
- Architectural style: Mission/Spanish Revival
- MPS: Venice MPS
- NRHP reference No.: 89002047
- Added to NRHP: December 18, 1989

The Venezia Park Historic District is a U.S. historic district in Venice, Florida. It is bounded by Palermo Street, Sorrento Street, South Harbor Drive, and Salerno Street, and contains 47 historic buildings. On December 18, 1989, it was added to the U.S. National Register of Historic Places.

== Gallery ==
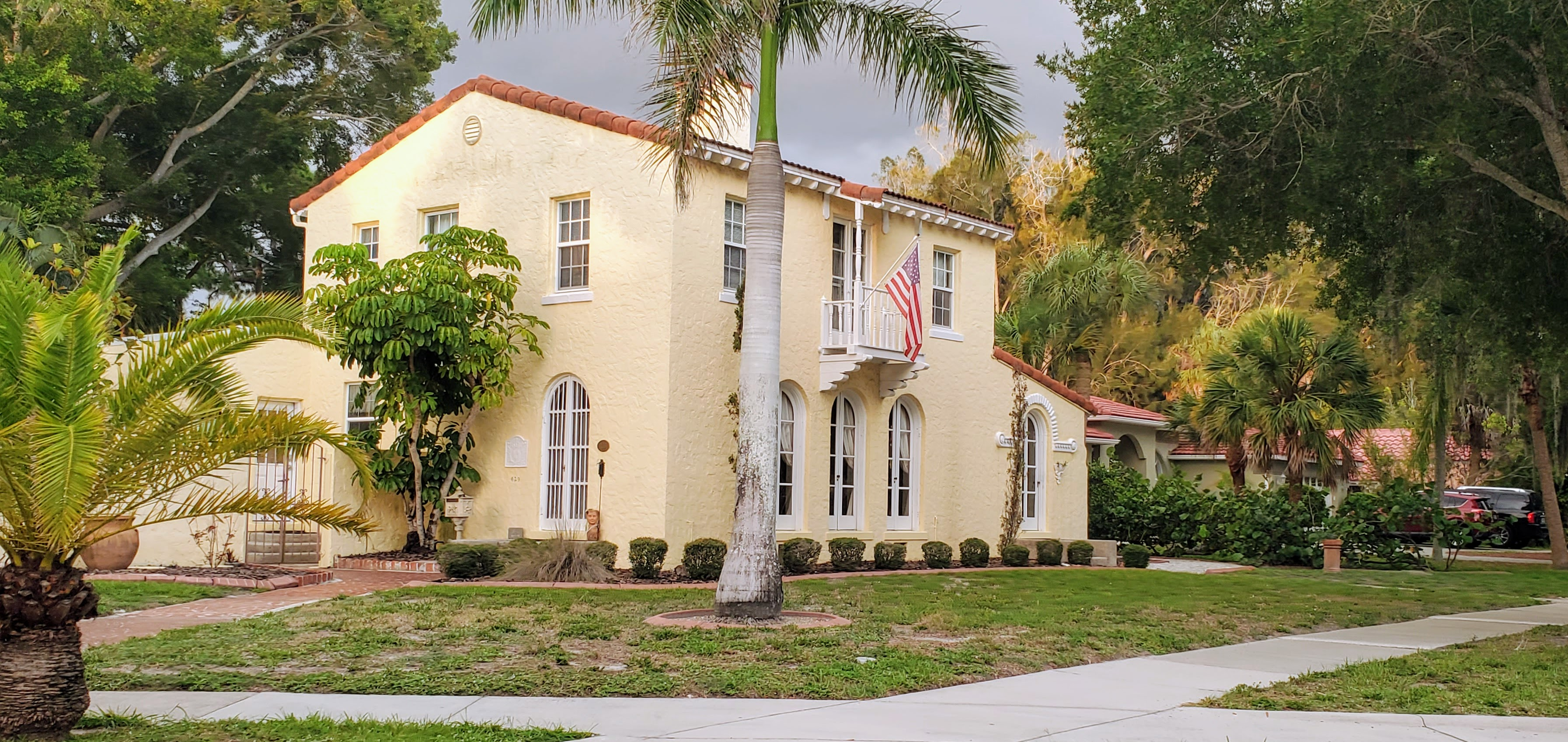
429 South Nassau Street

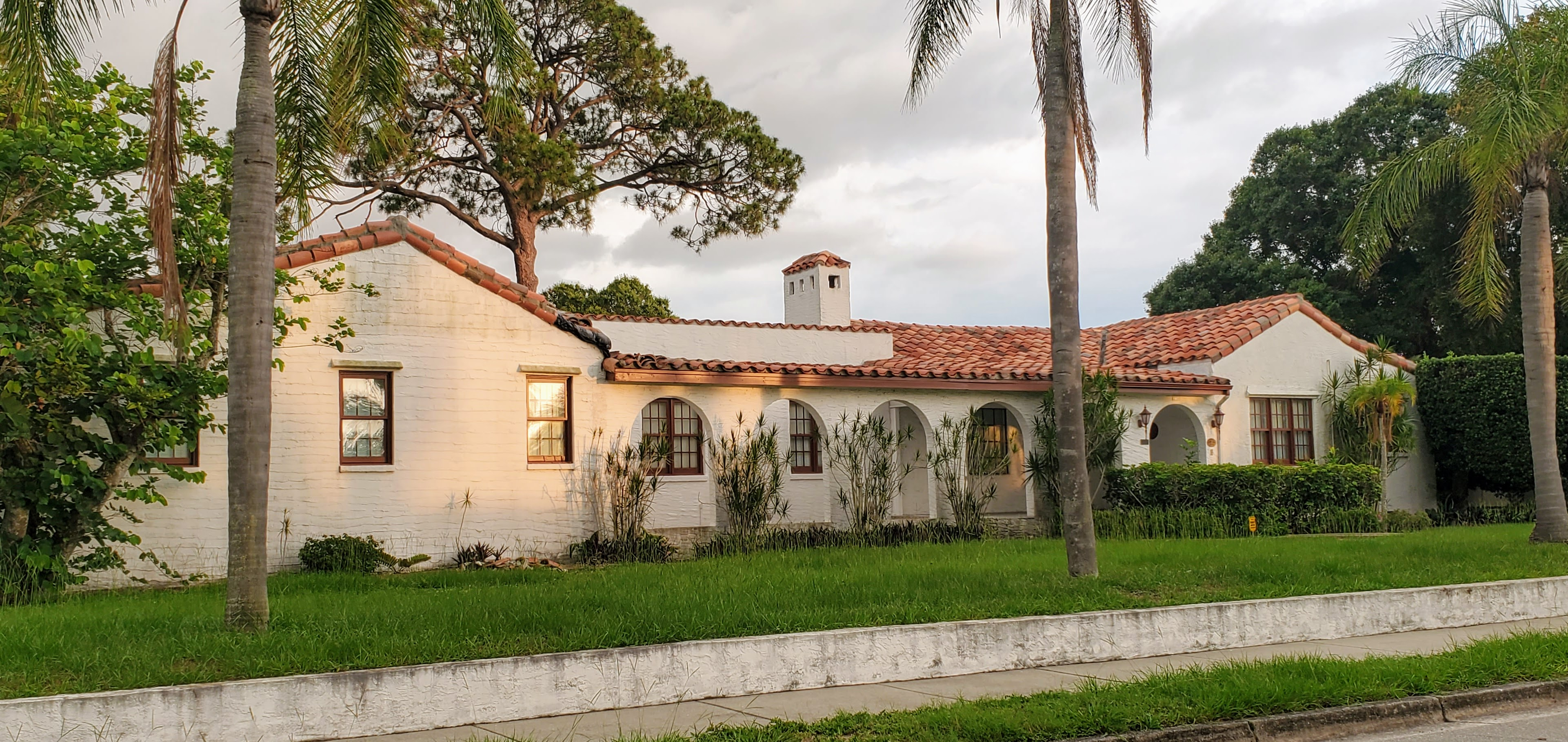
333 Sorrento Street

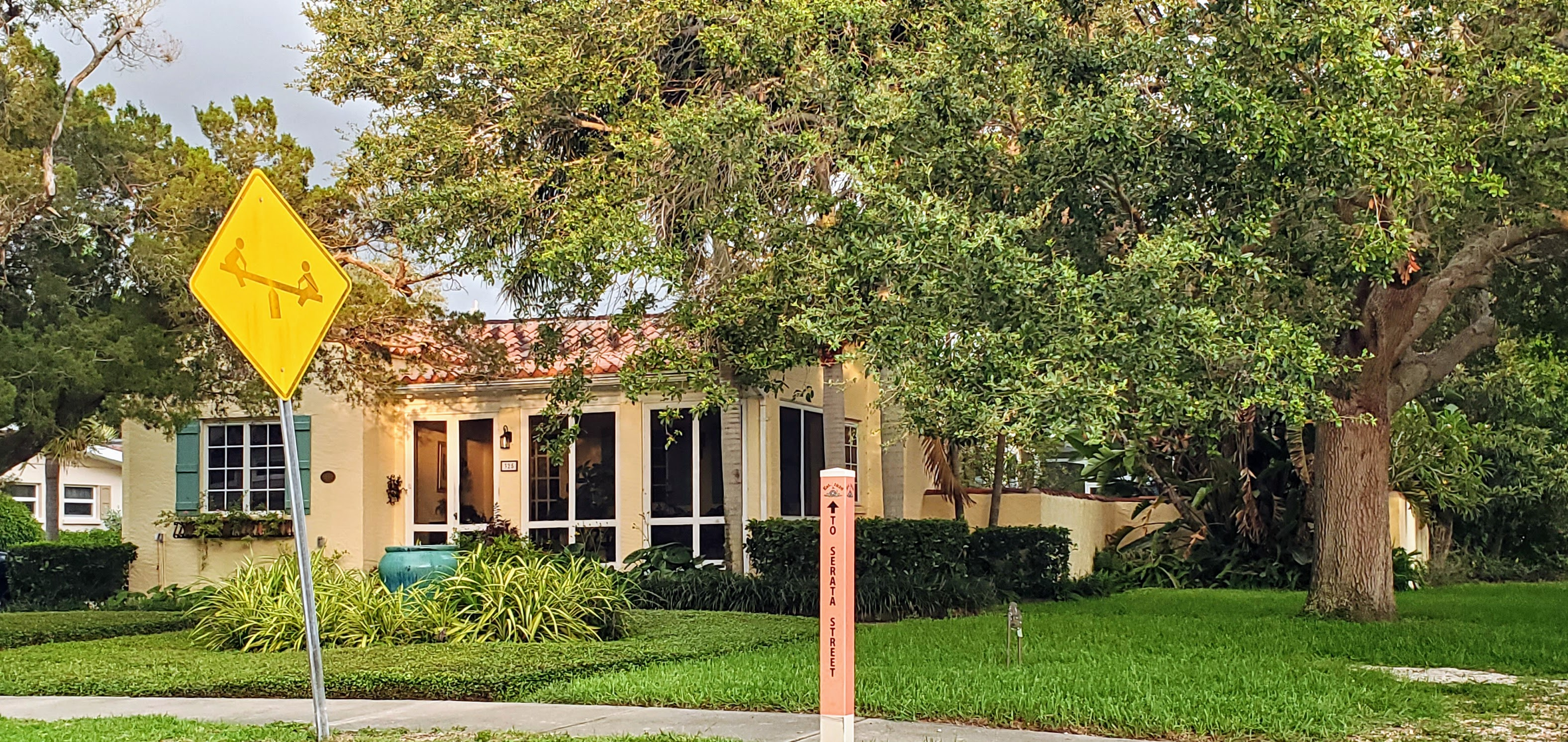
325 Sorrento Street

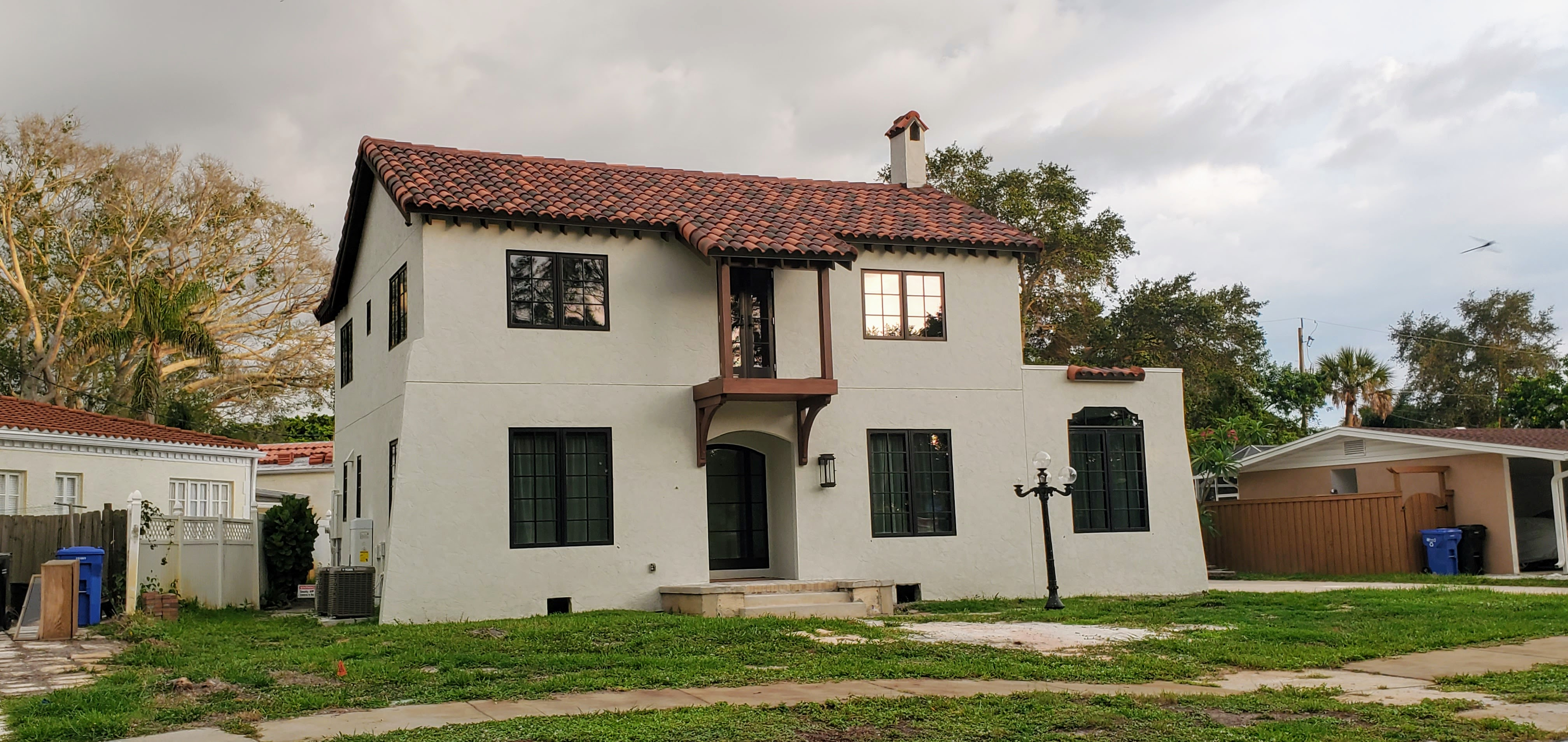
309 Sorrento Street
