= Triangle Inn =

- U.S. National Register of Historic Places
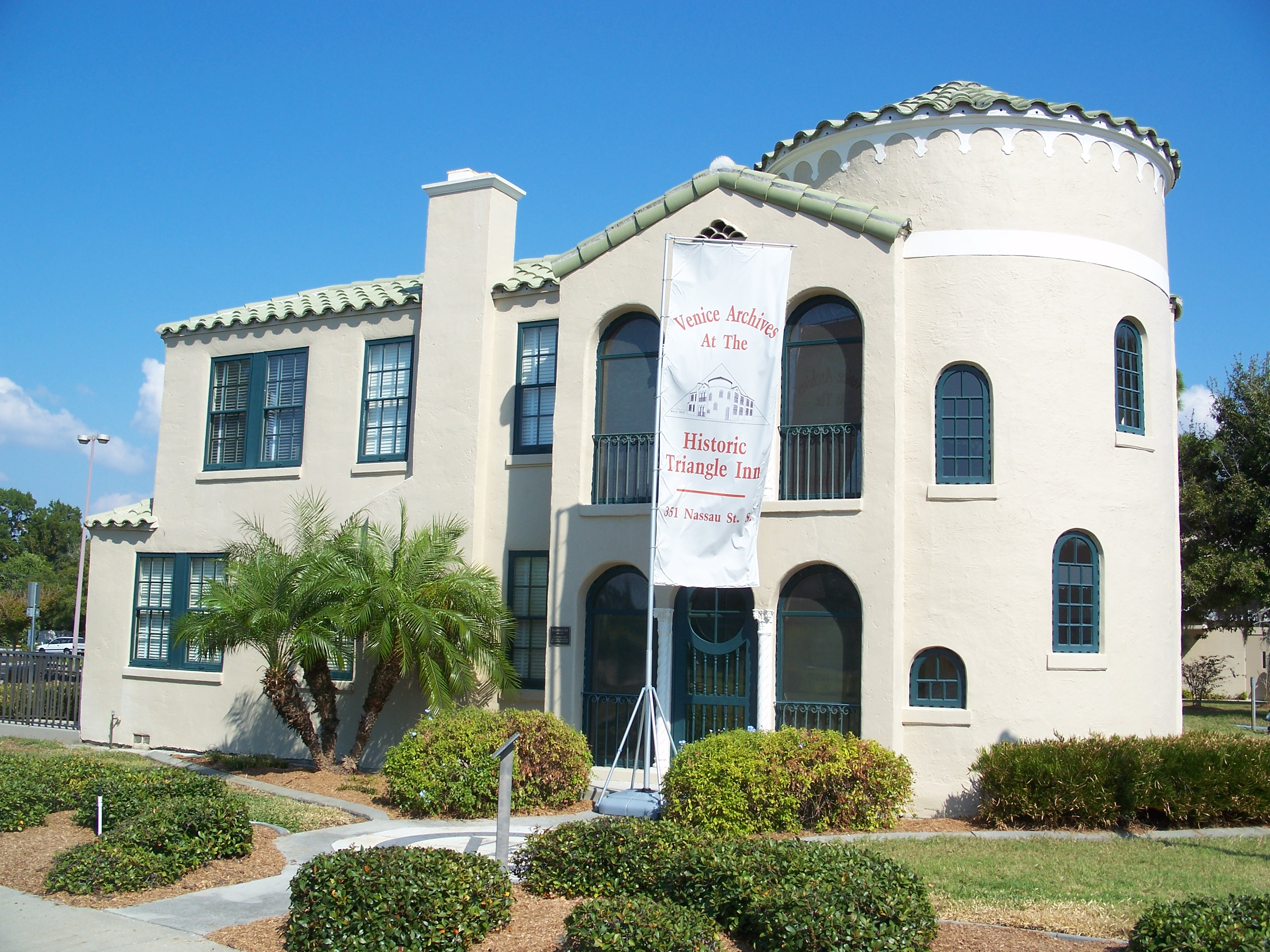

- Location within Florida Location within the United States
- Location: Venice, Florida
- Coordinates: 27°5′42″N 82°26′52″W
- Architectural style: Mission/Spanish Revival
- MPS: Venice MPS
- NRHP reference No.: 96000175
- Added to NRHP: February 23, 1996

The Triangle Inn is a historic site in Venice, Florida. It was built in 1927, and originally used as a rooming house operated by Mrs. Augusta Miner. It is now used as a Museum and archives depository. It is located at 351 South Nassau Street. On February 23, 1996, it was added to the U.S. National Register of Historic Places.
