= Hotel Venice =

Historic hotel in Venice, Florida, US

- U.S. National Register of Historic Places
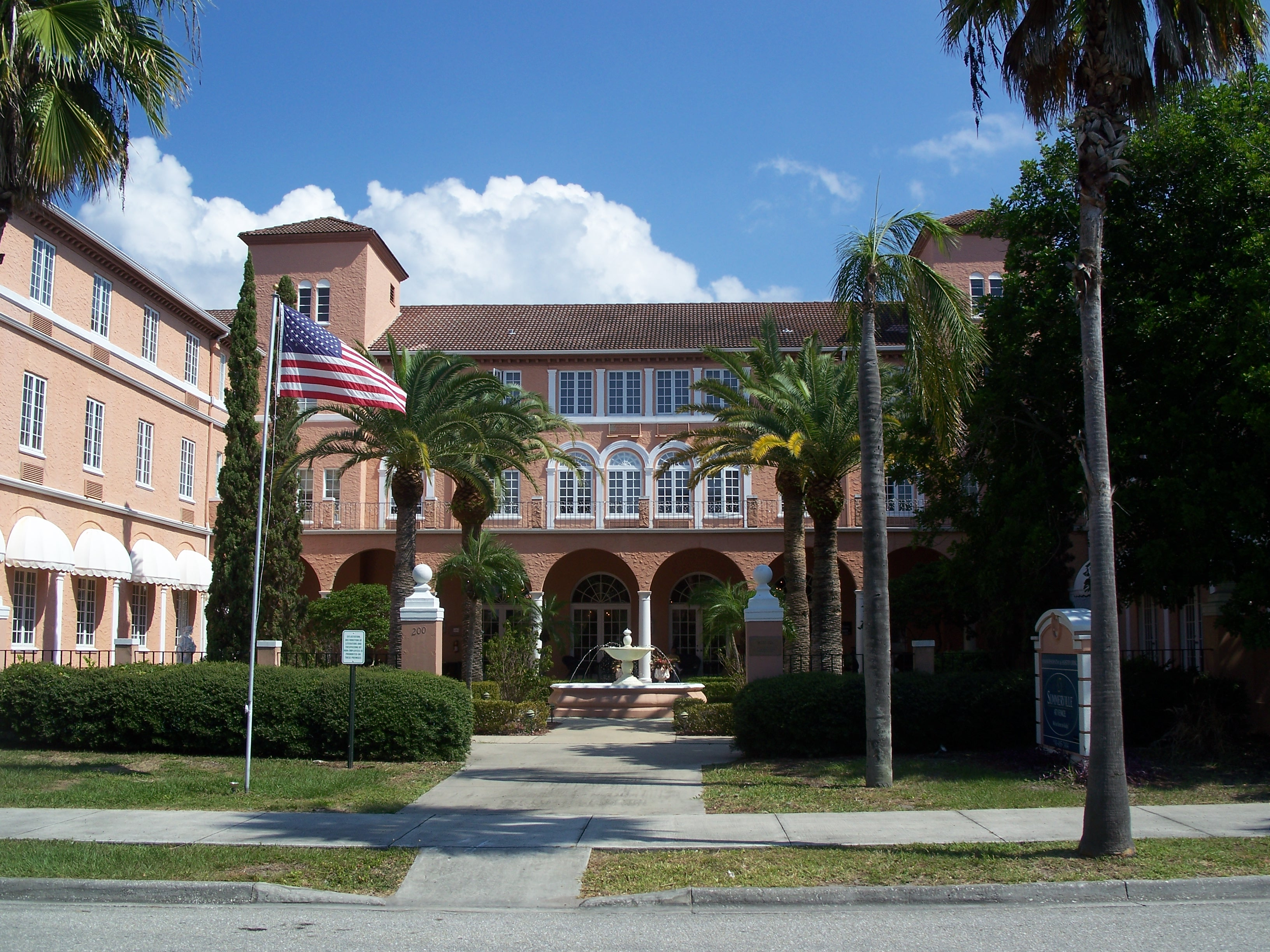

- Location within Florida Location within the United States
- Location: Venice, Florida
- Coordinates: 27°6′1″N 82°27′11″W
- Architect: Walker & Gillette
- Architectural style: Mediterranean Revival
- NRHP reference No.: 84000961
- Added to NRHP: February 6, 1984

The Hotel Venice is a historic hotel in Venice, Florida. It is located at 200 North Nassau Street. On February 6, 1984, it was added to the U.S. National Register of Historic Places.
