= Venice, Florida =

City in the United States

- City
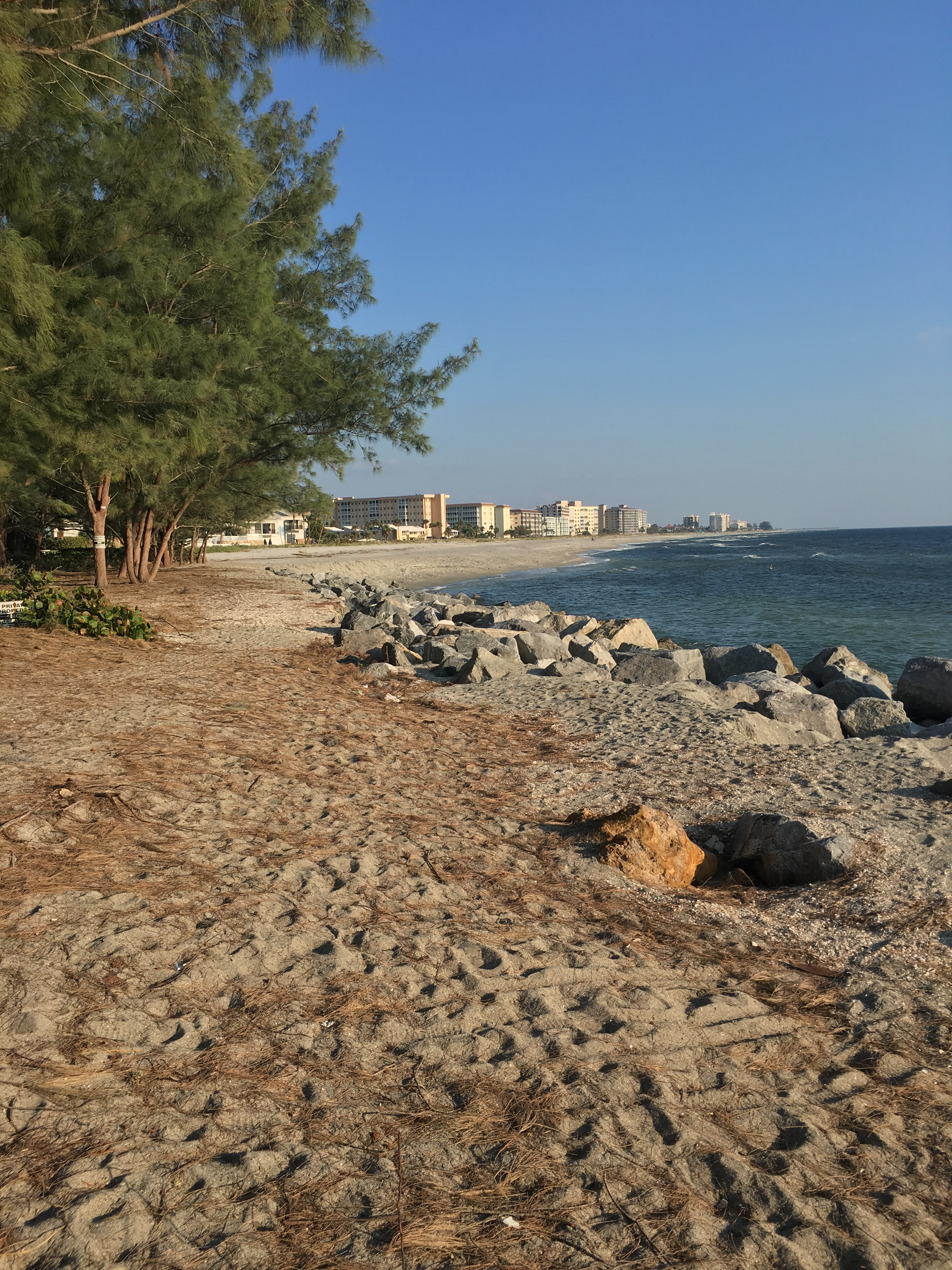
- Venice's Beachfront from Humphris Park

- Flag Seal
- Nickname: Shark Tooth Capital of the World
- Motto: "City on the Gulf"
- Location in Sarasota County and the state of Florida
- Coordinates: 27°07′46″N 82°23′45″W
- Country: United States
- State: Florida
- County: Sarasota
- Settled: Horse and Chaise – c. 1870s; Venice – 1888
- Incorporated: Town – July 1, 1926; City – May 9, 1927
- Named for: Venice, Italy

Government
  - Type: Council–manager

Area
  - City: 17.78 sq mi (46.05 km^{2})
  - Land: 16.13 sq mi (41.77 km^{2})
  - Water: 1.65 sq mi (4.28 km^{2})
- Elevation: 13 ft (4.0 m)

Population (2020)
  - City: 25,463
  - Density: 1,578.7/sq mi (609.54/km^{2})
  - Metro: 833,716 (US: 71st)
  - Metro density: 542/sq mi (209/km^{2})
- Time zone: UTC−5 (Eastern (EST))
  - Summer (DST): UTC−4 (EDT)
- ZIP codes: 34275, 34284–34287, 34290–34293
- Area code: 941
- FIPS code: 12–73900
- GNIS feature ID: 2405640
- Website: venicegov.com

Venice is a city in Sarasota County, Florida, United States. The city includes what locals call "Venice Island", a portion of the mainland that is accessed via bridges over the artificially created Intracoastal Waterway. The city is located in Southwest Florida. As of the 2020 Census, the city had a population of 25,463, up from 20,748 at the 2010 Census. Venice is part of the Sarasota metropolitan area.

== History ==
The area that is now Venice was originally the home of Paleo-Indians, with evidence of their presence dating back to 8200 BCE. As thousands of years passed, and the climate changed and some of the Pleistocene animals that the Indians hunted became extinct, the descendants of the Paleo-Indians found new ways to create stone and bone weapons to cope with their changing environment. These descendants became known as the Archaic peoples. Evidence of their camps along with stone tools were discovered in parts of Venice. Over several millennia the culture and people who lived in the area changed. The peoples who the Spanish encountered when they arrived in 1500s were mound-builders. Venice lay in a boundary area between two cultures, the Tocobaga and the Calusa, and thus evidence of each can be found in the area.

The 1870s is when the area saw the first significant wave of white settlers. Venice was first known as "Horse and Chaise" because of a carriage-like tree formation that marked the spot for fishermen. During the 1870s, Robert Rickford Roberts established a homestead near a bay that bears his name today, Roberts Bay. Francis H. "Frank" Higel, originally from France, arrived in Venice in 1883 with his wife and six sons. He purchased land in the Roberts' homestead for $2,500, equivalent to $86,000 in 2025, to set up his own homestead. Higel established a citrus operation involving the production of several lines of canned citrus items, such as jams, pickled orange peel, lemon juice, and orange wine. Higel established a post office in 1885 with the name Eyry as a service for the community's thirty residents. In February he was appointed as postmaster but the office was shut down months later, in November 1885, with services moving back to Osprey. In 1888, another post office was established, this time with the name "Venice", a name Higel himself suggested because of its likeness to the canal city in Italy.

During the Florida land boom of the 1920s, Fred H. Albee, an orthopedic surgeon renowned for his bone-grafting operations, bought 112 acres (45 ha) from Bertha Palmer to develop Venice. He hired John Nolen to plan the city and create a master plan for the streets. Albee sold the land to the Brotherhood of Locomotive Engineers and retained Nolen as city planner. The first portions of the city and infrastructure were constructed in 1925–1926.

In 1926, a fire department was formed with thirty-two volunteers. In that same year, the Brotherhood of Locomotive Engineers purchased a new American LaFrance fire engine from Moore Haven that had been damaged in the Great Miami Hurricane.

The first library was also founded in 1926 by the Venice-Nokomis Women's Club. This "library" was a few books on a shelf in a local store. The library had several temporary homes until 1965 when the Venice Area Public Library was built. This building remained in use until it was demolished in 2017 due to mold. A new library was constructed in 2018 called the William H. Jervey Jr. Venice Library, named after a benefactor of the new building.

On July 1, 1926, it was officially incorporated as the "Town of Venice", and on May 9, 1927, amended its Charter to change its name to the "City of Venice".

On October 9, 2024, Hurricane Milton made landfall just north of Venice, near Siesta Key, where Venice was near the ground zero of the hurricane's worst storm surge and high winds. Milton came less than two weeks after Hurricane Helene caused several feet of storm surge throughout the city of Venice.

== Geography ==
According to the United States Census Bureau, the city has a total area of 16.6 square miles (43.1 km^{2}), of which 15.3 square miles (39.5 km^{2}) is land and 1.4 square miles (3.5 km^{2}), or 8.19%, is water. The climate of Venice is humid subtropical, bordering very closely on a tropical savanna climate, thus featuring pronounced wet and dry seasons.

=== Climate ===
The climate in this area is characterized by hot, humid summers and generally mild winters. According to the Köppen climate classification, the City of Venice has a humid subtropical climate zone (Cfa).

Climate data for Venice, Florida, 1991–2020 normals, extremes 1927–present
| Month | Jan | Feb | Mar | Apr | May | Jun | Jul | Aug | Sep | Oct | Nov | Dec | Year |
|---|---|---|---|---|---|---|---|---|---|---|---|---|---|
| Record high °F (°C) | 89 (32) | 89 (32) | 90 (32) | 95 (35) | 98 (37) | 100 (38) | 100 (38) | 99 (37) | 99 (37) | 97 (36) | 91 (33) | 89 (32) | 100 (38) |
| Mean maximum °F (°C) | 83.3 (28.5) | 84.1 (28.9) | 86.9 (30.5) | 90.1 (32.3) | 93.9 (34.4) | 95.4 (35.2) | 95.5 (35.3) | 96.1 (35.6) | 94.8 (34.9) | 92.5 (33.6) | 88.1 (31.2) | 84.3 (29.1) | 96.9 (36.1) |
| Mean daily maximum °F (°C) | 72.4 (22.4) | 75.0 (23.9) | 77.9 (25.5) | 82.5 (28.1) | 87.3 (30.7) | 89.9 (32.2) | 91.5 (33.1) | 91.5 (33.1) | 90.0 (32.2) | 85.8 (29.9) | 80.0 (26.7) | 75.0 (23.9) | 83.2 (28.4) |
| Daily mean °F (°C) | 62.0 (16.7) | 64.6 (18.1) | 67.7 (19.8) | 72.5 (22.5) | 77.5 (25.3) | 81.4 (27.4) | 82.9 (28.3) | 83.1 (28.4) | 81.6 (27.6) | 76.6 (24.8) | 69.9 (21.1) | 64.9 (18.3) | 73.7 (23.2) |
| Mean daily minimum °F (°C) | 51.6 (10.9) | 54.2 (12.3) | 57.5 (14.2) | 62.5 (16.9) | 67.8 (19.9) | 72.9 (22.7) | 74.3 (23.5) | 74.7 (23.7) | 73.2 (22.9) | 67.5 (19.7) | 59.7 (15.4) | 54.8 (12.7) | 64.2 (17.9) |
| Mean minimum °F (°C) | 34.3 (1.3) | 37.7 (3.2) | 42.9 (6.1) | 50.3 (10.2) | 59.1 (15.1) | 68.3 (20.2) | 70.8 (21.6) | 71.5 (21.9) | 68.6 (20.3) | 54.9 (12.7) | 46.2 (7.9) | 39.8 (4.3) | 32.7 (0.4) |
| Record low °F (°C) | 23 (−5) | 26 (−3) | 31 (−1) | 38 (3) | 49 (9) | 56 (13) | 62 (17) | 65 (18) | 60 (16) | 36 (2) | 29 (−2) | 22 (−6) | 22 (−6) |
| Average precipitation inches (mm) | 2.68 (68) | 2.00 (51) | 2.97 (75) | 2.47 (63) | 3.25 (83) | 7.81 (198) | 7.39 (188) | 8.34 (212) | 7.16 (182) | 3.35 (85) | 1.54 (39) | 2.31 (59) | 51.27 (1,302) |
| Average precipitation days (≥ 0.01 in) | 7.5 | 5.4 | 5.9 | 5.3 | 6.5 | 12.2 | 14.9 | 16.0 | 14.4 | 8.1 | 4.7 | 6.4 | 107.3 |
Source: NOAA

== Demographics ==
Historical population
| Census | Pop. | Note | %± |
|---|---|---|---|
| 1930 | 309 | | — |
| 1940 | 507 | | 64.1% |
| 1950 | 727 | | 43.4% |
| 1960 | 3,444 | | 373.7% |
| 1970 | 6,648 | | 93.0% |
| 1980 | 12,153 | | 82.8% |
| 1990 | 16,922 | | 39.2% |
| 2000 | 17,764 | | 5.0% |
| 2010 | 20,748 | | 16.8% |
| 2020 | 25,463 | | 22.7% |
U.S. Decennial Census

=== Racial and ethnic composition ===
Venice racial composition (Hispanics excluded from racial categories) (NH = Non-Hispanic)
| Race | Pop 2010 | Pop 2020 | % 2010 | % 2020 |
|---|---|---|---|---|
| White (NH) | 19,762 | 23,466 | 95.25% | 92.16% |
| Black or African American (NH) | 113 | 172 | 0.54% | 0.68% |
| Native American or Alaska Native (NH) | 24 | 29 | 0.12% | 0.11% |
| Asian (NH) | 152 | 244 | 0.73% | 0.96% |
| Pacific Islander or Native Hawaiian (NH) | 3 | 5 | 0.01% | 0.02% |
| Some other race (NH) | 14 | 62 | 0.07% | 0.24% |
| Two or more races/Multiracial (NH) | 129 | 540 | 0.62% | 2.12% |
| Hispanic or Latino (any race) | 551 | 945 | 2.66% | 3.71% |
| Total | 20,748 | 25,463 | 100.00% | 100.00% |

=== 2020 census ===
As of the 2020 census, Venice had a population of 25,463. The median age was 69.8 years. 5.0% of residents were under the age of 18 and 62.8% of residents were 65 years of age or older. For every 100 females there were 83.3 males, and for every 100 females age 18 and over there were 83.0 males age 18 and over.

100.0% of residents lived in urban areas, while 0.0% lived in rural areas.

There were 13,962 households in Venice, of which 6.1% had children under the age of 18 living in them. Of all households, 48.3% were married-couple households, 16.1% were households with a male householder and no spouse or partner present, and 30.7% were households with a female householder and no spouse or partner present. About 39.5% of all households were made up of individuals and 29.5% had someone living alone who was 65 years of age or older.

There were 19,992 housing units, of which 30.2% were vacant. The homeowner vacancy rate was 2.8% and the rental vacancy rate was 19.9%.

Racial composition as of the 2020 census
| Race | Number | Percent |
|---|---|---|
| White | 23,710 | 93.1% |
| Black or African American | 179 | 0.7% |
| American Indian and Alaska Native | 58 | 0.2% |
| Asian | 248 | 1.0% |
| Native Hawaiian and Other Pacific Islander | 5 | 0.0% |
| Some other race | 264 | 1.0% |
| Two or more races | 999 | 3.9% |
| Hispanic or Latino (of any race) | 945 | 3.7% |

=== 2010 census ===
As of the 2010 United States census, there were 20,748 people, 11,143 households, and 5,926 families residing in the city.

== Arts and culture ==
=== Annual cultural events ===
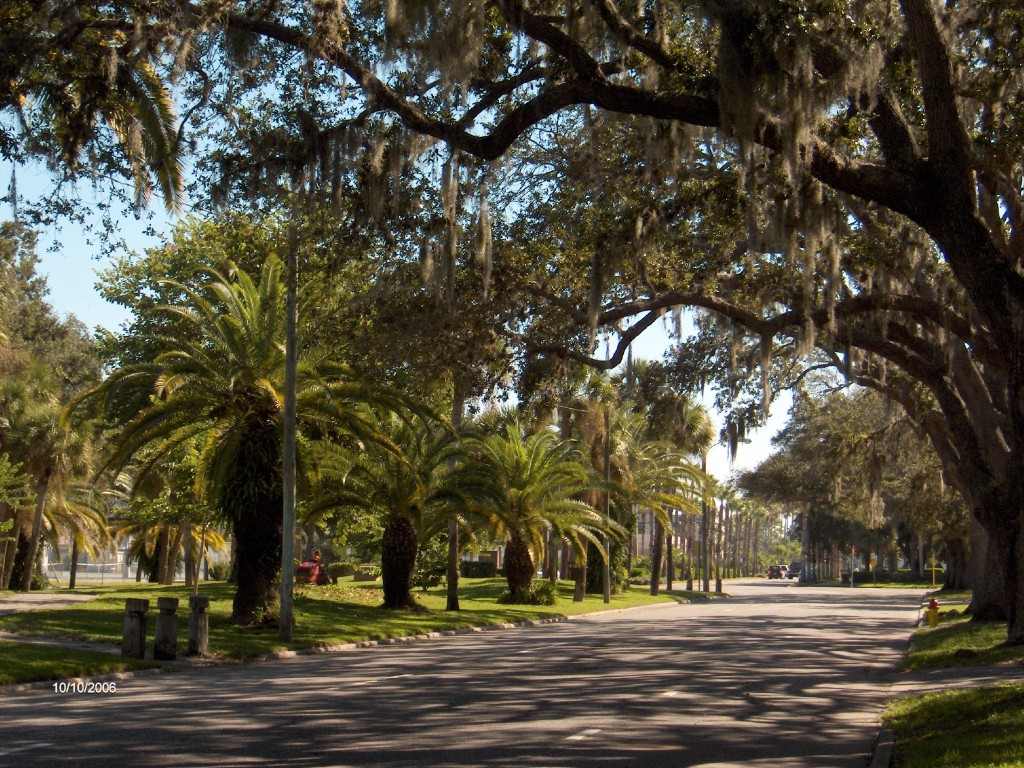
Venice Avenue

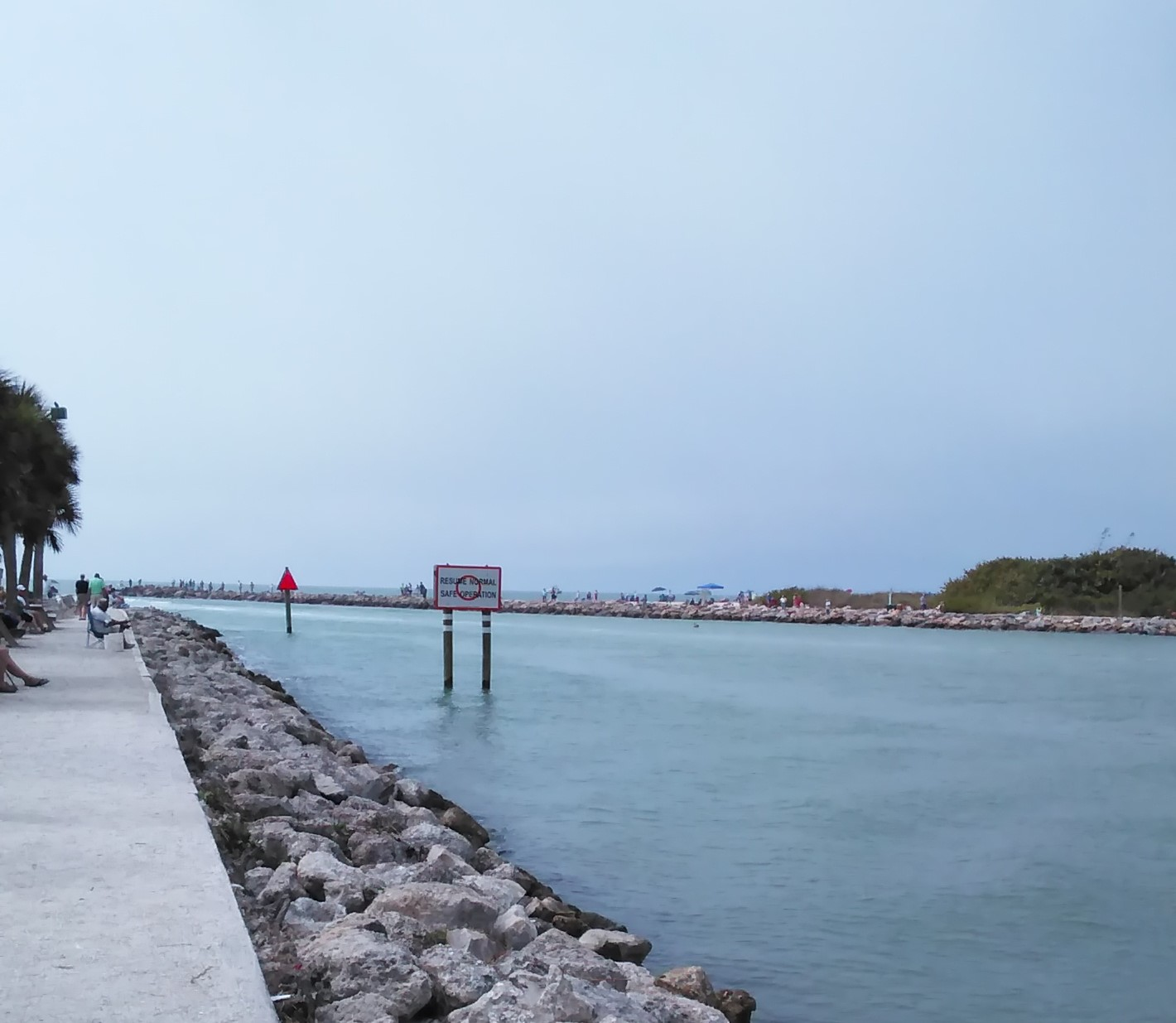
The Venice Jetty

Venice has been called the "Shark's Tooth Capital of the World", and hosts an annual Shark's Tooth Festival to celebrate the abundance of fossilized shark's teeth on its coastal shores.

=== Museums and other points of interest ===
The following structures and areas are listed on the National Register of Historic Places:

- Armada Road Multi-Family District
- Blalock House
- Eagle Point Historic District
- Edgewood Historic District
- Hotel Venice
- House at 710 Armada Road South
- Johnson-Schoolcraft Building
- Levillain-Letton House
- Triangle Inn
- Valencia Hotel and Arcade
- Venezia Park Historic District
- Venice Depot

=== Theatre and music ===
- Venice Theatre is the largest per-capita community theater in the United States with an operating budget of almost three million dollars.

== Media ==
Venice Gondolier Sun is a newspaper published twice weekly; it has a circulation of 13,500.

WVEA-TV is licensed to Venice, is based in Tampa, and broadcasts from Riverview.

== Infrastructure ==
=== Transportation ===
==== Roads ====
- I-75 – the only freeway in the area, I-75 runs through the mainly inland areas of the City of Venice.
- U.S. 41 (Tamiami Trail) – The Major North-South Route through the city.
- U.S. 41 Bypass (Venice Bypass) – Forms a Bypass Loop of Venice Island, and the City of Venice.
- State Road 681 – Venice Connector, this road was formerly the southern terminus of Interstate 75 in the early 1980s.
- County Road 762 (Laurel Road) – Runs East-West and connects US-41 to I-75 in the Northern Sections of the city.
- County Road 765 (Jacaranda Boulevard) - Runs North-South, skirting the Western City Limits, connecting I-75 to US-41, southwest of the city.
- County Road 772 (Venice Avenue) – The primary east-west Roadway in the city, CR 762 connects US-41 to US-41 Bypass and Jacaranda Blvd (CR-765).

==== Rail and Air ====
Passenger railroad service, served by the Seaboard Coast Line, last ran to the station in 1971, immediately prior to the Amtrak assumption of passenger rail operation. Previously Venice was one of the Florida destinations of the Orange Blossom Special.

Venice Municipal Airport is located 2 miles (3.2 km) from the central business district and is primarily used by chartered and private jets as well as small personal aircraft.

=== Law enforcement ===
Venice is patrolled by the Venice Police Department. The department has special units for bike patrols, traffic patrols, and boat patrols. There are 76 members of the police department serving in three divisions: administration, patrol, and criminal investigations.

== Notable people ==
- Brian Aherne, English actor
- Dri Archer, American football player
- Trey Burton, American football player
- Hector A. Cafferata Jr., United States Marine who received the Medal of Honor for his heroic service at the Battle of Chosin Reservoir during the Korean War
- Walter Farley, author of The Black Stallion
- Dick Hyman, jazz musician
- Forrest Lamp, professional football player
- Alvin Mitchell, American football player
- Nick Pachota, mayor and state legislator.
- Tom Tresh, professional baseball player
- Steve Trout, former major league baseball pitcher
- Early Wynn, professional baseball player

== See also ==
- Huffman Aviation, a flight school at Venice Municipal Airport which was attended by several of the hijackers of the September 11 attacks
- Kentucky Military Institute, which wintered in Venice for many years
- Ringling Bros. and Barnum & Bailey Circus, whose Clown College originally was located in Venice, and whose winter headquarters used to be in Venice
- Tervis Tumbler, a United States drinkware manufacturer with headquarters and production in Venice
- Epiphany Cathedral (Venice, Florida), is a Roman Catholic cathedral located in Venice
- Venetian Waterway Park, is a 9.3-mile concrete trail located in Venice consisting of two parallel trails along the Intracoastal Waterway (ICW) connected by two bridges.
