= Johnson Schoolcraft Building =

- U.S. National Register of Historic Places
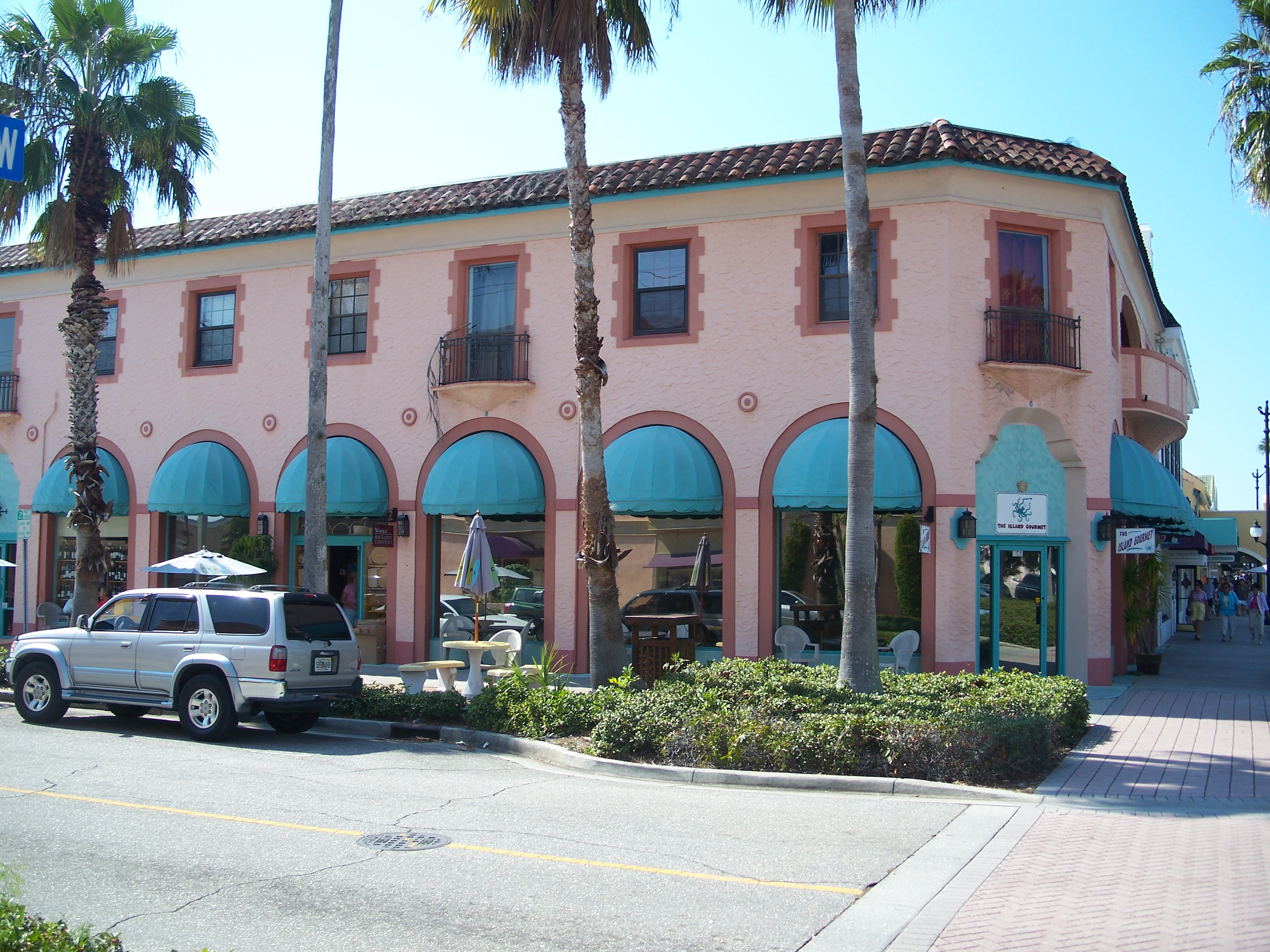

- Location within Florida Location within the United States
- Location: Venice, Florida
- Coordinates: 27°5′58.91″N 82°26′44.13″W
- Architectural style: Mission/Spanish Revival
- NRHP reference No.: 96001522
- Added to NRHP: December 27, 1996

The Johnson Schoolcraft Building (also known as the Venice Pharmacy) is a historic site in Venice, Florida. It is located at 201-203 West Venice Avenue. On December 27, 1996, it was added to the U.S. National Register of Historic Places.

== History ==
The Johnson-Schoolcraft Building, also known as the Venice Pharmacy, is a historic building located in Venice, Florida. The Johnson-Schoolcraft Building was constructed in 1926 by William D. Schoolcraft and C. Paul Johnson, the principals of Johnson-Schoolcraft, Inc.

Designed with a Mission/Spanish Revival architectural style, it was originally intended to have five apartments on the second floor and retail space on the first floor, with Venice Pharmacy, Inc. as its first tenant. The retail space was originally adorned with a pink onyx soda fountain and had store fixtures made of solid mahogany, with a black walnut finish.

By 1928, the Peninsula Telephone Company was operating its switchboard from the building. In case of an emergency, residents would reach out to the switchboard operator who would then turn on a red light on the roof of the building to signal the Venice police to get in touch with the operator.

Although the interior has undergone significant changes over time, the exterior of the building remains largely unchanged from its original 1926 appearance.

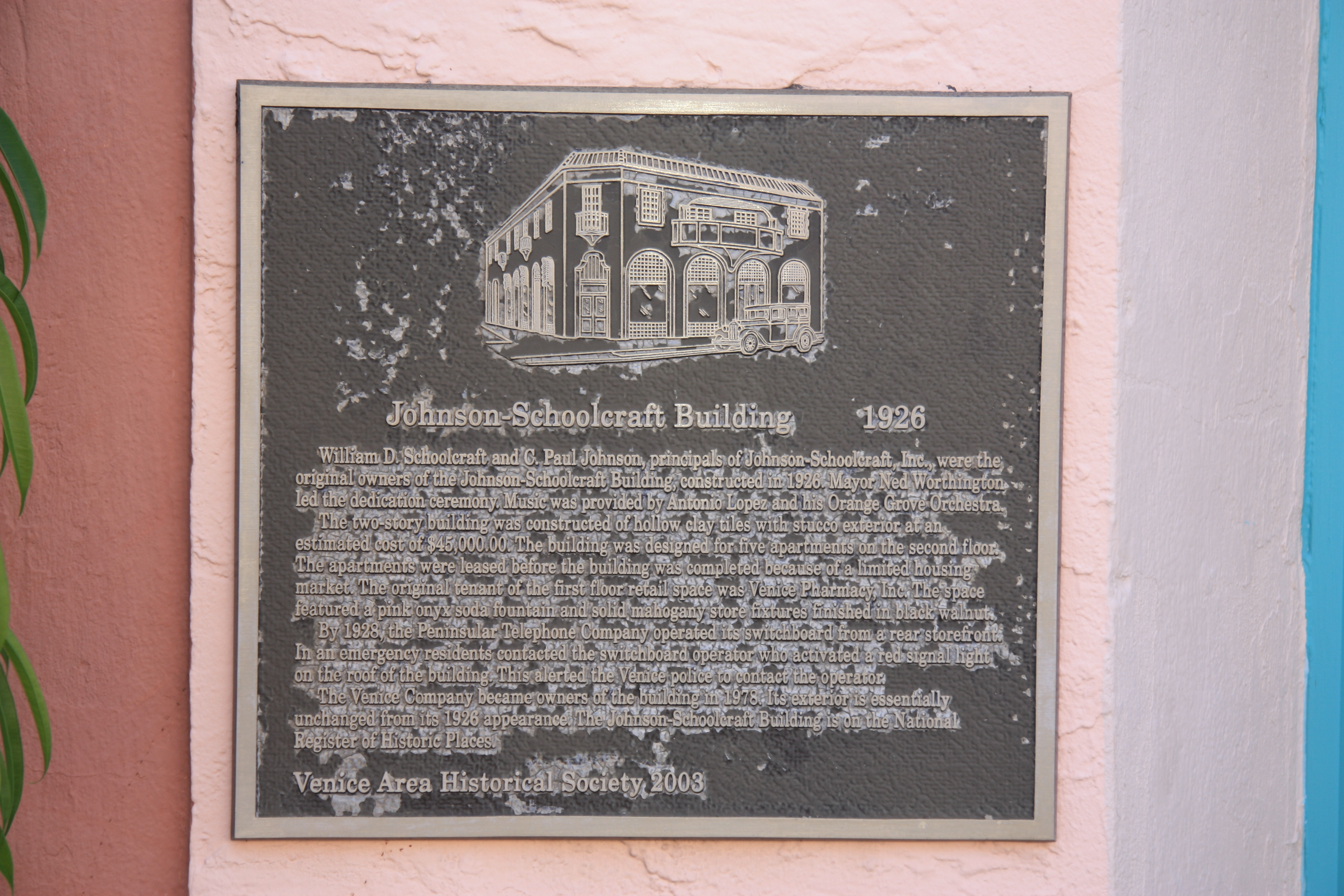
Johnson-Schoolcraft Building 1926 Marker
