= National Register of Historic Places listings in Sarasota County, Florida =

Location of Sarasota County in Florida

This is a list of the National Register of Historic Places listings in Sarasota County, Florida.

This is intended to be a complete list of the properties and districts on the National Register of Historic Places in Sarasota County, Florida, United States. The locations of National Register properties and districts for which the latitude and longitude coordinates are included below, may be seen in a map.

There are 103 properties and districts listed on the National Register in the county. One property was once listed, but has since been delisted.

This National Park Service list is complete through NPS recent listings posted May 1, 2026.

Contents: Counties in Florida (non-linked contain no National Register listings)
Alachua - Baker - Bay - Bradford - Brevard - Broward - Calhoun - Charlotte - Citrus - Clay - Collier - Columbia - DeSoto - Dixie - Duval - Escambia - Flagler - Franklin - Gadsden - Gilchrist - Glades - Gulf - Hamilton - Hardee - Hendry - Hernando - Highlands - Hillsborough (Tampa) - Holmes - Indian River - Jackson - Jefferson - Lafayette - Lake - Lee - Leon - Levy - Liberty - Madison - Manatee - Marion - Martin - Miami-Dade (Miami) - Monroe - Nassau - Okaloosa - Okeechobee - Orange - Osceola - Palm Beach - Pasco - Pinellas - Polk - Putnam - St. Johns - St. Lucie - Santa Rosa - Sarasota - Seminole - Sumter - Suwannee - Taylor - Union - Volusia - Wakulla - Walton - Washington

== Current listings ==
	Name on the Register	Image	Date listed	Location	City or town	Description
1	American National Bank Building	American National Bank Building	September 9, 1998 (#98001154)	1330 Main Street; 27°20′06″N 82°32′37″W	Sarasota	
2	Appleby Building	Appleby Building	June 28, 2001 (#01000683)	501-513 Kumquat Court; 27°20′24″N 82°32′26″W	Sarasota	
3	William Martin Armistead House	William Martin Armistead House	March 30, 2009 (#09000165)	1510 Hyde Park Street; 27°18′55″N 82°32′22″W	Sarasota	
4	Armada Road Multi-Family District	Armada Road Multi-Family District	December 18, 1989 (#89002049)	Roughly bounded by Granada Avenue, Harbor Drive South, Armada Road South, and Park Boulevard South; 27°05′48″N 82°26′58″W	Venice	Part of the Venice MPS
5	Bacheller-Brewer Model Home Estate	Bacheller-Brewer Model Home Estate	February 10, 1992 (#91002034)	1903 Lincoln Drive; 27°19′31″N 82°31′55″W	Sarasota	
6	Bacon and Tomlin, Inc.	Bacon and Tomlin, Inc.	March 22, 1984 (#84003829)	201 South Palm Avenue; 27°20′02″N 82°32′30″W	Sarasota	Part of the Sarasota MRA
7	Bay Haven School	Bay Haven School	April 23, 1984 (#84003832)	2901 West Tamiami Circle; 27°21′42″N 82°33′06″W	Sarasota	Part of the Sarasota MRA
8	Bee Ridge Woman's Club	Bee Ridge Woman's Club	February 10, 1995 (#95000052)	4919 Andrew Avenue; 27°16′53″N 82°29′03″W	Sarasota	
9	Frank and Matilda Binz House	Frank and Matilda Binz House	August 5, 1994 (#94000736)	5050 Bay Shore Road; 27°22′40″N 82°33′36″W	Sarasota	
10	Bispham-Wilson Historic District	Bispham-Wilson Historic District	September 14, 2002 (#02001010)	4613 South Tamiami Trail; 27°17′10″N 82°31′54″W	Sarasota	
11	Blackburn Point Bridge	Blackburn Point Bridge	March 29, 2001 (#01000290)	Blackburn Point Road at the Gulf Intracoastal Waterway; 27°10′46″N 82°29′41″W	Osprey	
12	Blalock House	Blalock House	April 12, 1989 (#89000235)	241 South Harbor Drive; 27°05′49″N 82°26′59″W	Venice	Part of the Venice MPS
13	Bryson-Crane House	Bryson-Crane House	June 1, 2005 (#05000501)	5050 Brywill Circle; 27°22′39″N 82°33′34″W	Sarasota	
14	Burns Court Historic District	Burns Court Historic District	March 22, 1984 (#84003830)	400-446 Burns Court and 418, 426, and 446 South Pineapple Avenue; 27°20′03″N 82°32′23″W	Sarasota	Part of the Sarasota MRA
15	Burns Realty Company-Karl Bickel House	Burns Realty Company-Karl Bickel House	March 5, 1987 (#87000196)	101 North Tamiami Trail; 27°20′13″N 82°32′50″W	Sarasota	Part of the Sarasota MRA
16	William J. Burns House	William J. Burns House	March 21, 1997 (#97000248)	47 South Washington Drive; 27°19′07″N 82°34′27″W	Sarasota	
17	Waters and Elsa Burrows Historic District	Waters and Elsa Burrows Historic District	February 3, 2012 (#11001077)	400 Palmetto Avenue; 27°12′09″N 82°29′36″W	Osprey	
18	Caples'-Ringlings' Estates Historic District	Caples'-Ringlings' Estates Historic District	December 15, 1982 (#82001039)	Roughly bounded by Sarasota Bay, U.S. Route 41, Parkview Drive, and North Shore Avenue; 27°22′58″N 82°33′40″W	Sarasota	
19	Casa Del Mar	Casa Del Mar	February 14, 1997 (#97000051)	25 South Washington Drive; 27°19′09″N 82°34′28″W	Sarasota	
20	Central-Cocoanut Historic District	Central-Cocoanut Historic District	June 17, 2005 (#05000599)	11th Street, Tamiami Trail, 22nd Street, and railroad tracks 27°21′05″N 82°32′38″W	Sarasota	
21	Chidsey Library	Chidsey Library	May 4, 2011 (#11000241)	701 North Tamiami Trail; 27°20′32″N 82°32′51″W	Sarasota	
22	City Waterworks	City Waterworks	April 23, 1984 (#84003831)	1015 North Orange Avenue; 27°20′41″N 82°32′22″W	Sarasota	Part of the Sarasota MRA
23	Corrigan House	Corrigan House	May 26, 1994 (#94000528)	463 Sapphire Drive; 27°22′41″N 82°33′46″W	Sarasota	
24	Crisp Building	Crisp Building	April 21, 2000 (#00000388)	1970 Main Street; 27°20′11″N 82°31′54″W	Sarasota	1926 building which has been renovated
25	F. A. DeCanizares House	F. A. DeCanizares House	March 22, 1984 (#84003833)	1215 North Palm Avenue; 27°20′11″N 82°32′46″W	Sarasota	Part of the Sarasota MRA
26	DeMarcay Hotel	DeMarcay Hotel	March 22, 1984 (#84003834)	27 South Palm Avenue; 27°20′07″N 82°32′35″W	Sarasota	Part of the Sarasota MRA
27	Downtown Sarasota Historic District	Downtown Sarasota Historic District	April 9, 2009 (#09000183)	Bound by 1st Street, Orange Avenue, State Street, Gulf Stream Avenue, and North Pineapple Avenue; 27°19′58″N 82°32′14″W	Sarasota	Boundary decrease (listed October 7, 2010): 1400 block of Main St.
28	Eagle Point Historic District	Eagle Point Historic District	October 3, 1991 (#91001448)	759 North Tamiami Trail; 27°06′31″N 82°26′46″W	Venice	
29	Earle House	Earle House	September 2, 1993 (#93000908)	4521 Bayshore Road; 27°22′24″N 82°33′44″W	Sarasota	
30	Edgewood Historic District	Edgewood Historic District	December 18, 1989 (#89002048)	Roughly bounded by School Street, Myrtle Avenue, the Venice-By-Way, and Groveland Avenue; 27°05′46″N 82°25′51″W	Venice	Part of the Venice MPS
31	Edwards Theatre	Edwards Theatre	March 22, 1984 (#84003835)	57 North Pineapple Avenue; 27°20′12″N 82°32′38″W	Sarasota	Part of the Sarasota MRA
32	El Patio Apartments	El Patio Apartments	May 6, 1993 (#93000390)	500 North Audubon Place; 27°20′25″N 82°31′37″W	Sarasota	
33	El Vernona Apartments-Broadway Apartments	El Vernona Apartments-Broadway Apartments	March 22, 1984 (#84003836)	1133 4th Street; 27°20′23″N 82°32′54″W	Sarasota	Part of the Sarasota MRA
34	El Vernona Hotel-John Ringling Hotel	El Vernona Hotel-John Ringling Hotel	March 5, 1987 (#87000197)	111 North Tamiami Trail; 27°20′13″N 82°32′50″W	Sarasota	Part of the Sarasota MRA
35	Field Estate	Field Estate	June 5, 1986 (#86001238)	Field Road and Camino Real; 27°17′11″N 82°32′20″W	Sarasota	
36	Frances-Carlton Apartments	Frances-Carlton Apartments	March 22, 1984 (#84003837)	1221-1227 North Palm Avenue; 27°20′11″N 82°32′46″W	Sarasota	Part of the Sarasota MRA
37	Dr. Joseph Halton House	Dr. Joseph Halton House	March 22, 1984 (#84003838)	308 Cocoanut Avenue; 27°20′19″N 82°32′41″W	Sarasota	Part of the Sarasota MRA
38	Harding Circle Historic District	Harding Circle Historic District	January 16, 2001 (#00001650)	Roughly John Ringling Boulevard, St. Armands Circle, and Boulevard of Presidents; 27°19′08″N 82°34′37″W	Sarasota	
39	Hermitage-Whitney Historic District	Hermitage-Whitney Historic District	October 31, 2002 (#02001261)	6660 Manasota Key Road; 26°57′40″N 82°23′03″W	Englewood	
40	Hotel Venice	Hotel Venice	February 6, 1984 (#84000961)	200 North Nassau Street; 27°06′01″N 82°27′11″W	Venice	
41	House at 507 Jackson Drive	House at 507 Jackson Drive	February 5, 1998 (#98000060)	507 Jackson Drive; 27°19′00″N 82°34′31″W	Sarasota	
42	House at 710 Armada Road South	House at 710 Armada Road South	August 17, 1989 (#89001073)	710 Armada Road South; 27°05′52″N 82°26′49″W	Venice	Part of the Venice MPS
43	Johnson Chapel Missionary Baptist Church	Johnson Chapel Missionary Baptist Church	October 8, 1997 (#97001218)	506 Church Street; 27°07′49″N 82°26′54″W	Laurel	
44	Johnson-Schoolcraft Building	Johnson-Schoolcraft Building	December 27, 1996 (#96001522)	201-203 West Venice Avenue; 27°06′16″N 82°27′07″W	Venice	Part of the Venice MPS
45	Edson Keith Estate	Edson Keith Estate	March 14, 1991 (#91000282)	5500 South Tamiami Trail; 27°16′13″N 82°31′58″W	Sarasota	
46	Dr. Walter Kennedy House	Dr. Walter Kennedy House	April 14, 1994 (#94000349)	1876 Oak Street; 27°19′53″N 82°31′59″W	Sarasota	
47	S. H. Kress Building	S. H. Kress Building	March 22, 1984 (#84003839)	1442 Main Street; 27°20′09″N 82°32′31″W	Sarasota	Part of the Sarasota MRA
48	Lamolithic Historic District		September 23, 2025 (#100012256)	5528, 5540, 5544, and 5546 Avenida Del Mare; 27°16′09″N 82°33′18″W	Sarasota	Sarasota School of Architecture MPS
49	Laurel Park Historic District	Laurel Park Historic District	March 11, 2008 (#08000164)	Bounded by Morrill Street, Orange Avenue, Brother Geenen Way, Julia Place, and Lafayette Court; 27°19′52″N 82°32′05″W	Sarasota	
50	Hilton Leech House and Amagansett Art School	Hilton Leech House and Amagansett Art School	June 22, 1995 (#95000732)	1666 Hillview Street; 27°18′59″N 82°32′10″W	Sarasota	Part of the Sarasota School of Architecture MPS
51	Charles E. Leigh House	Charles E. Leigh House	February 4, 2019 (#100003412)	139 S. Washington Dr. 27°19′01″N 82°34′26″W	Sarasota	
52	Lemon Bay Woman's Club	Lemon Bay Woman's Club	August 11, 1988 (#88001150)	51 North Maple Street; 26°57′47″N 82°21′29″W	Englewood	
53	Levillain-Letton House	Levillain-Letton House	April 12, 1989 (#89000234)	229 South Harbor Drive; 27°05′50″N 82°26′59″W	Venice	Part of the Venice MPS
54	Little Salt Springs	Little Salt Springs	July 10, 1979 (#79000692)	Off U.S. Route 41; 27°04′29″N 82°14′00″W	North Port	
55	Maine Colony Historic District	Maine Colony Historic District	October 5, 2005 (#05001118)	Bounded by Swift Road Ashton Road, Portland Way and Grafton Street; 27°16′47″N 82°31′06″W	Sarasota	
56	Manasota Beach Club Historic District		April 13, 2023 (#100008818)	7660 Manasota Key Rd; 26°59′17″N 82°24′04″W	Englewood	
57	Markowitz House		February 28, 2022 (#100007477)	1189 Center Place; 27°19′39″N 82°35′08″W	Sarasota	Sarasota School of Architecture style residence on the MPS
58	Miakka School House	Miakka School House	July 3, 1986 (#86001458)	Miakka and Wilson Roads; 27°19′10″N 82°16′11″W	Miakka	
59	Municipal Auditorium-Recreation Club	Municipal Auditorium-Recreation Club	February 24, 1995 (#95000164)	801 North Tamiami Trail; 27°20′35″N 82°32′52″W	Sarasota	
60	Newtown Historic District		April 19, 2024 (#100010223)	Bounded by: Myrtle St., Washington Blvd, 18th St., and Seminole Gulf Railway; 27°21′35″N 82°32′18″W	Sarasota	
61	Lucienne Nielsen House	Lucienne Nielsen House	March 21, 2007 (#07000163)	3730 Sandspur Lane; 27°10′27″N 82°29′39″W	Nokomis	Part of the Sarasota School of Architecture MPS
62	Nokomis Beach Pavilion	Nokomis Beach Pavilion	May 28, 2013 (#13000320)	100 Casey Key Rd. 27°07′28″N 82°28′13″W	Nokomis	part of the Sarasota School of Architecture MPS
63	John Nolen Plan of Venice Historic District	John Nolen Plan of Venice Historic District	November 8, 2010 (#10000840)	Laguna Dr on N, Home Park Rd on E, the Corso on S, The Esplanade on W 27°05′46″N 82°26′35″W	Venice	
64	Osprey Archeological and Historic Site	Osprey Archeological and Historic Site	April 16, 1975 (#75000569)	337 North Tamiami Trail; 27°12′N 82°29′W	Osprey	
65	Osprey School	Osprey School	July 15, 1994 (#94000707)	337 North Tamiami Trail (U.S. Route 41); 27°12′05″N 82°29′29″W	Osprey	
66	Out of Door School	Out of Door School	October 28, 1994 (#94001276)	444 Reid Street; 27°17′09″N 82°33′38″W	Sarasota	
67	Overtown Historic District	Overtown Historic District	July 19, 2002 (#02000781)	Roughly along Central and Cohen Avenues between 9th and 4th Streets; 27°22′13″N 82°32′35″W	Sarasota	
68	Christy Payne Mansion	Christy Payne Mansion	September 25, 1998 (#98001201)	800 South Palm Avenue; 27°19′40″N 82°32′25″W	Sarasota	
69	Capt. W. F. Purdy House	Capt. W. F. Purdy House	March 22, 1984 (#84003840)	3315 Bayshore Road; 27°21′52″N 82°33′24″W	Sarasota	Part of the Sarasota MRA
70	L. D. Reagin House	L. D. Reagin House	October 25, 1984 (#84000111)	1213 North Palm Avenue; 27°20′11″N 82°32′48″W	Sarasota	Part of the Sarasota MRA
71	Leonard Reid House	Leonard Reid House	October 29, 2002 (#02000780)	2529 N. Orange Avenue; 27°21′33″N 82°32′20″W	Sarasota	
72	Revere Quality Institute House	Revere Quality Institute House	March 26, 2008 (#07001200)	100 Ogden Lane; 27°18′03″N 82°33′32″W	Sarasota	Part of the Sarasota School of Architecture MPS
73	Rigby's La Plaza Historic District	Rigby's La Plaza Historic District	April 25, 1994 (#94000373)	1002-1038 South Osprey Avenue, 1744 and 1776 Alta Vista Street, and 1777 Irving Avenue; 27°19′27″N 82°32′04″W	Sarasota	
74	Rosemary Cemetery	Rosemary Cemetery	November 16, 2003 (#03001143)	851 Central Avenue; 27°20′42″N 82°32′37″W	Sarasota	
75	Roth Cigar Factory	Roth Cigar Factory	March 22, 1984 (#84003841)	30 Mira Mar Court; 27°20′04″N 82°32′27″W	Sarasota	Part of the Sarasota MRA
76	Paul Rudolph Sarasota High School Addition	Paul Rudolph Sarasota High School Addition	June 27, 2012 (#12000365)	1000 School Ave., S. 27°19′29″N 82°31′33″W	Sarasota	Part of the Sarasota School of Architecture MPS
77	St. Paul Lutheran Church	St. Paul Lutheran Church	July 1, 2024 (#100010494)	2256 Bahia Vista Street; 27°19′21″N 82°31′27″W	Sarasota	Part of the Sarasota School of Architecture MPS
78	Sanderling Beach Club	Sanderling Beach Club	June 29, 1994 (#94000618)	105 Beach Road; 27°14′26″N 82°31′55″W	Sarasota	Part of the Sarasota School of Architecture MPS
79	Sarasota County Chamber of Commerce Building	Sarasota County Chamber of Commerce Building	July 28, 2020 (#100005395)	655 North Tamiami Trail; 27°20′31″N 82°32′49″W	Sarasota	
80	Sarasota County Courthouse	Sarasota County Courthouse	March 22, 1984 (#84003842)	2000 Main Street; 27°20′08″N 82°31′50″W	Sarasota	Part of the Sarasota MRA
81	Sarasota Garden Center	Sarasota Garden Center	January 24, 2022 (#100007394)	1131 Boulevard of the Arts; 27°20′29″N 82°32′52″W	Sarasota	Part of the Sarasota School of Architecture MPS
82	Sarasota Herald Building	Sarasota Herald Building	March 22, 1984 (#84003843)	539 South Orange Avenue; 27°19′53″N 82°32′19″W	Sarasota	Part of the Sarasota MRA
83	Sarasota High School	Sarasota High School	March 22, 1984 (#84003844)	1001 South Tamiami Trail; 27°19′30″N 82°31′46″W	Sarasota	Part of the Sarasota MRA
84	Sarasota Times Building	Sarasota Times Building	March 22, 1984 (#84003845)	1214-1216 1st Street; 27°20′12″N 82°32′46″W	Sarasota	Part of the Sarasota MRA
85	Sarasota Woman's Club	Sarasota Woman's Club	January 18, 1985 (#85000087)	1241 North Palm Avenue; 27°20′11″N 82°32′44″W	Sarasota	Part of the Sarasota MRA
86	George Schueler House	George Schueler House	September 26, 1997 (#97001170)	76 South Washington Drive; 27°19′04″N 82°34′25″W	Sarasota	
87	Scott Commercial Building	Scott Commercial Building	June 7, 2016 (#14001116)	261-265 S. Orange Ave. 27°20′02″N 82°32′19″W	Sarasota	Part of the Sarasota School of Architecture MPS
88	South Side School	South Side School	September 14, 1984 (#84003846)	1901 Webber Street; 27°18′29″N 82°31′53″W	Sarasota	Part of the Sarasota MRA
89	Southwick-Harmon House	Southwick-Harmon House	October 28, 2001 (#01001180)	1830 Lincoln Drive; 27°19′39″N 82°31′59″W	Sarasota	
90	Thomas House	Thomas House	July 1, 1994 (#94000666)	5030 Bay Shore Road; 27°22′38″N 82°33′36″W	Sarasota	
91	Triangle Inn	Triangle Inn	February 23, 1996 (#96000175)	351 South Nassau Street; 27°05′42″N 82°26′52″W	Venice	Part of the Venice MPS
92	Umbrella House	Umbrella House	February 4, 2019 (#100003417)	1300 Westway Dr. 27°19′45″N 82°35′03″W	Sarasota	Part of the Sarasota School of Architecture MPS
93	U.S. Post Office-Federal Building	U.S. Post Office-Federal Building	March 22, 1984 (#84003847)	111 South Orange Avenue; 27°20′09″N 82°32′19″W	Sarasota	Part of the Sarasota MRA
94	Valencia Hotel and Arcade	Valencia Hotel and Arcade	November 10, 1994 (#94001303)	229 West Venice Avenue; 27°05′58″N 82°26′50″W	Venice	Part of the Venice MPS
95	Venezia Park Historic District	Venezia Park Historic District	December 18, 1989 (#89002047)	Roughly bounded by Palermo Street, Sorrento Street, South Harbor Drive, and Salerno Street; 27°05′31″N 82°26′53″W	Venice	Part of the Venice MPS
96	Venice Depot	Venice Depot	August 17, 1989 (#89001072)	303 East Venice Avenue; 27°06′02″N 82°26′25″W	Venice	Part of the Venice MPS
97	Warm Mineral Springs	Warm Mineral Springs	November 28, 1977 (#77000408)	12200 San Servando Ave. 27°03′35″N 82°15′38″W	North Port	Part of the Sarasota School of Architecture MPS
98	Warm Mineral Springs Building Complex	Warm Mineral Springs Building Complex	August 30, 2019 (#100004352)	12200 San Servando Ave. 27°03′35″N 82°15′38″W	North Port	Part of the Sarasota School of Architecture MPS
99	Warm Mineral Springs Motel	Warm Mineral Springs Motel	February 5, 2013 (#12001255)	12597 South Tamiami Trail; 27°02′51″N 82°15′43″W	North Port	Part of the Sarasota School of Architecture MPS
100	J. G. Whitfield Estate	J. G. Whitfield Estate	September 12, 1985 (#85002177)	2704 Bayshore Drive; 27°21′35″N 82°33′17″W	Sarasota	
101	H. B. William House	H. B. William House	March 22, 1984 (#84003848)	1509 South Orange Avenue; 27°19′10″N 82°32′16″W	Sarasota	Part of the Sarasota MRA
102	Dr. C. B. Wilson House	Dr. C. B. Wilson House	March 22, 1984 (#84003849)	235 South Orange Avenue; 27°20′04″N 82°32′18″W	Sarasota	Part of the Sarasota MRA
103	Worth's Block	Worth's Block	June 3, 1998 (#98000651)	1490 Main Street; 27°20′09″N 82°32′27″W	Sarasota	

== Former listings ==
	Name on the Register	Image	Date listed	Date removed	Location	City or town	Description
1	Atlantic Coast Line Passenger Depot	Atlantic Coast Line Passenger Depot	March 22, 1984 (#84000957)	July 25, 2018	1 South School Avenue; 27°20′08″N 82°31′36″W	Sarasota	Part of the Sarasota MRA

== See also ==
- List of National Historic Landmarks in Florida
- National Register of Historic Places listings in Florida
