= Downtown Sarasota Historic District =

Historic district in Florida, United States

- U.S. National Register of Historic Places
- U.S. Historic district
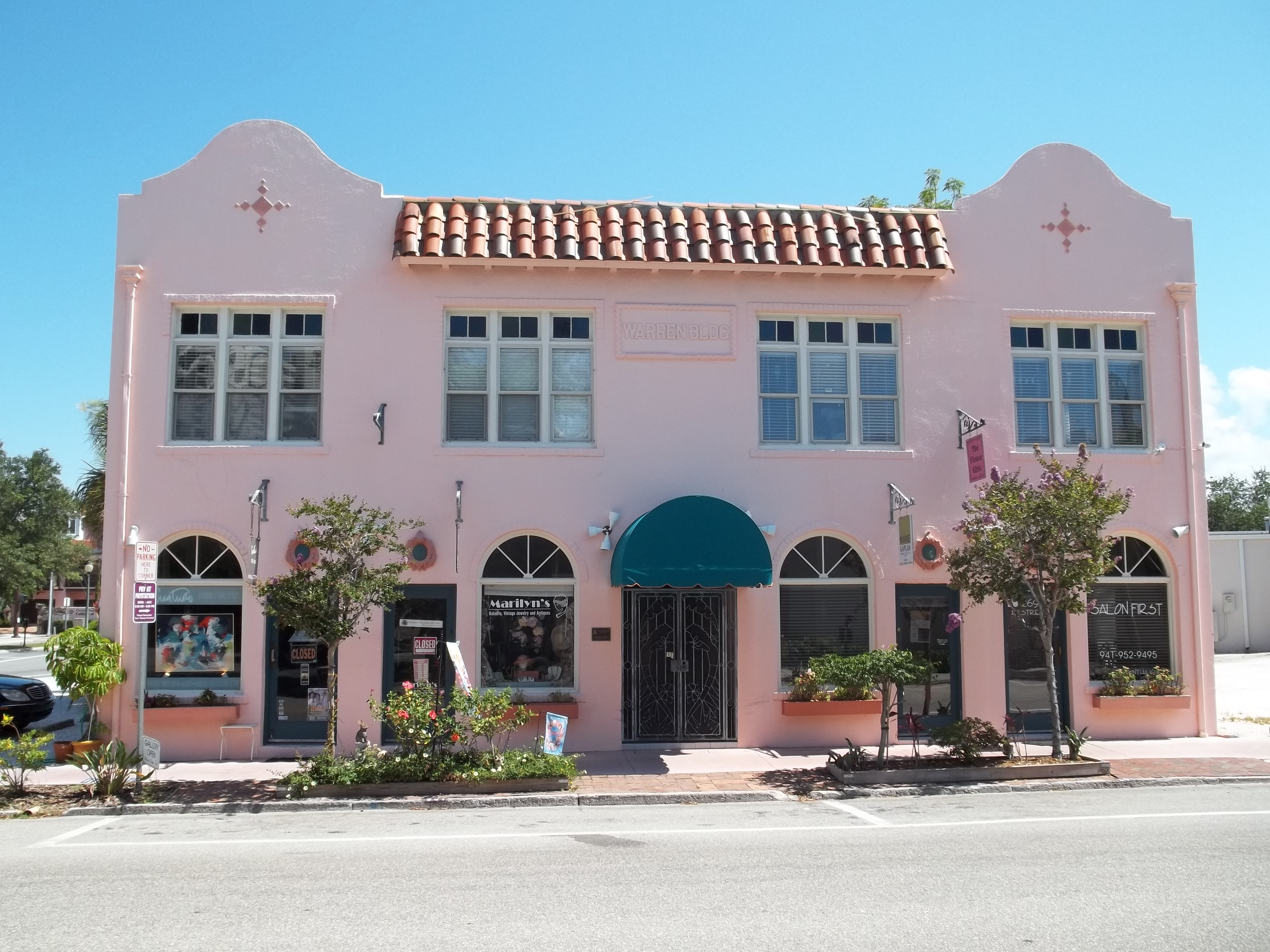
- Warren Building

- Location within Florida
- Location: Sarasota, Florida, USA
- Coordinates: 27°19′58″N 82°32′14″W
- Area: 19 acres (7.7 ha)
- Built: 1909–1959
- Architect: Various
- Architectural style: Various
- NRHP reference No.: 09000183
- Added to NRHP: April 9, 2009

Downtown Sarasota Historic District is a 19 acres (7.7 ha) historic district in Sarasota, Florida. It is bound by 1st Street, Orange Avenue, State Street, Gulf Stream Avenue and North Pineapple Avenue. On April 9, 2009, it was added to the U.S. National Register of Historic Places.

The historic district consists of 51 buildings. Six contributing properties in the district have been listed individually on the National Register:

- American National Bank Building
- DeMarcay Hotel
- Kress Building
- Roth Cigar Factory
- Edwards Theatre
- Worth's Block.

== Gallery ==
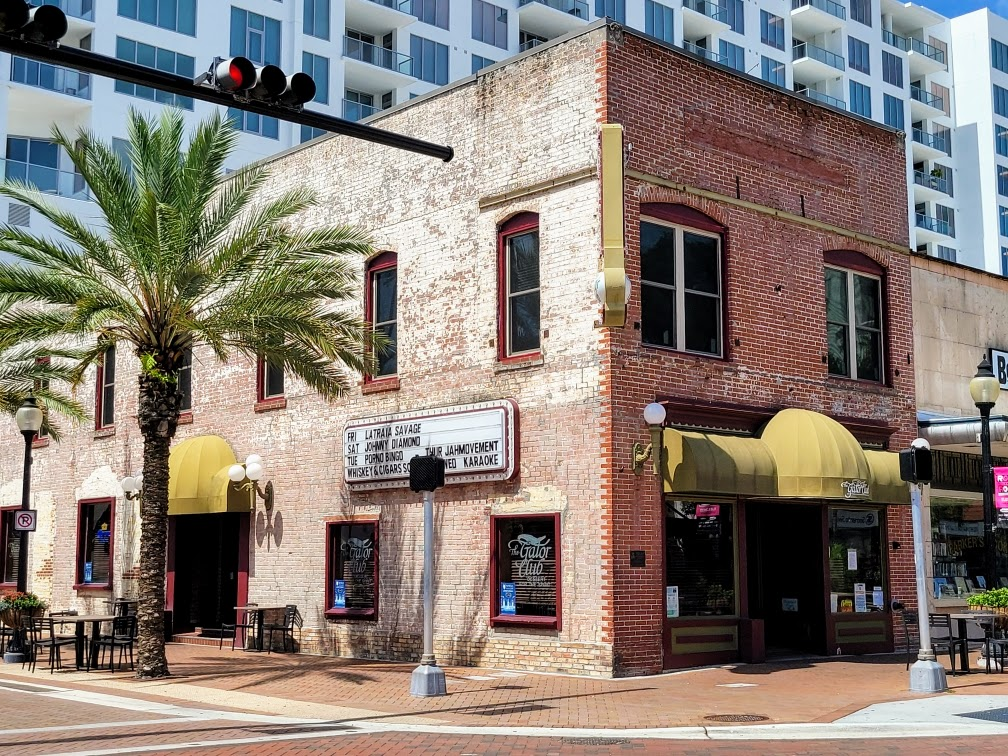
Worth's Block

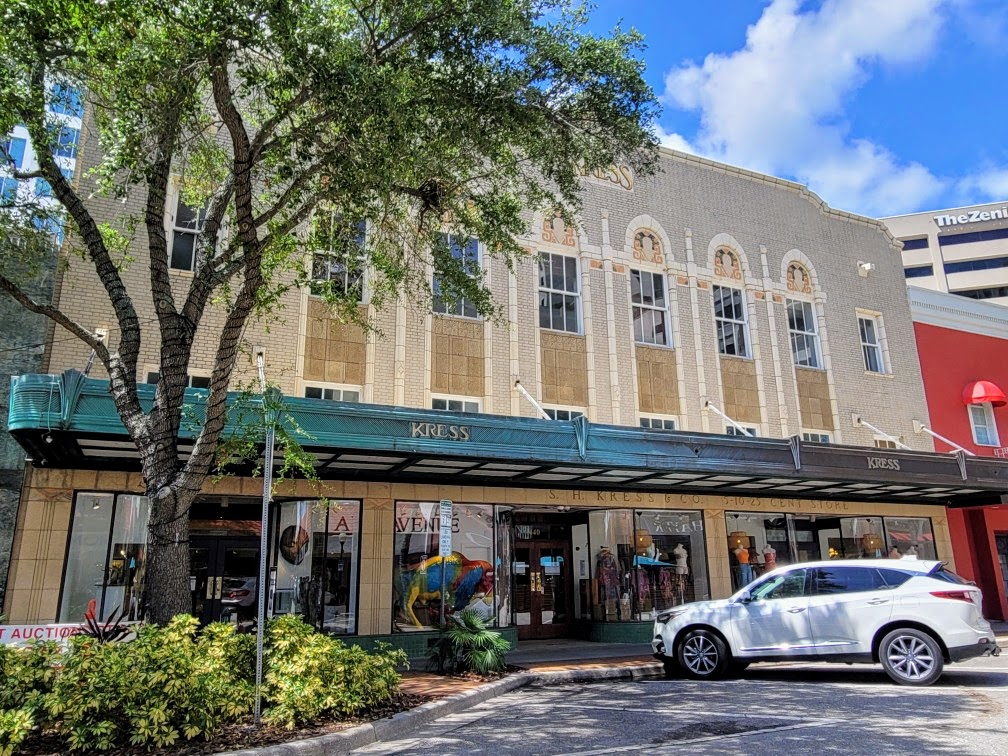
S.H. Kress Building

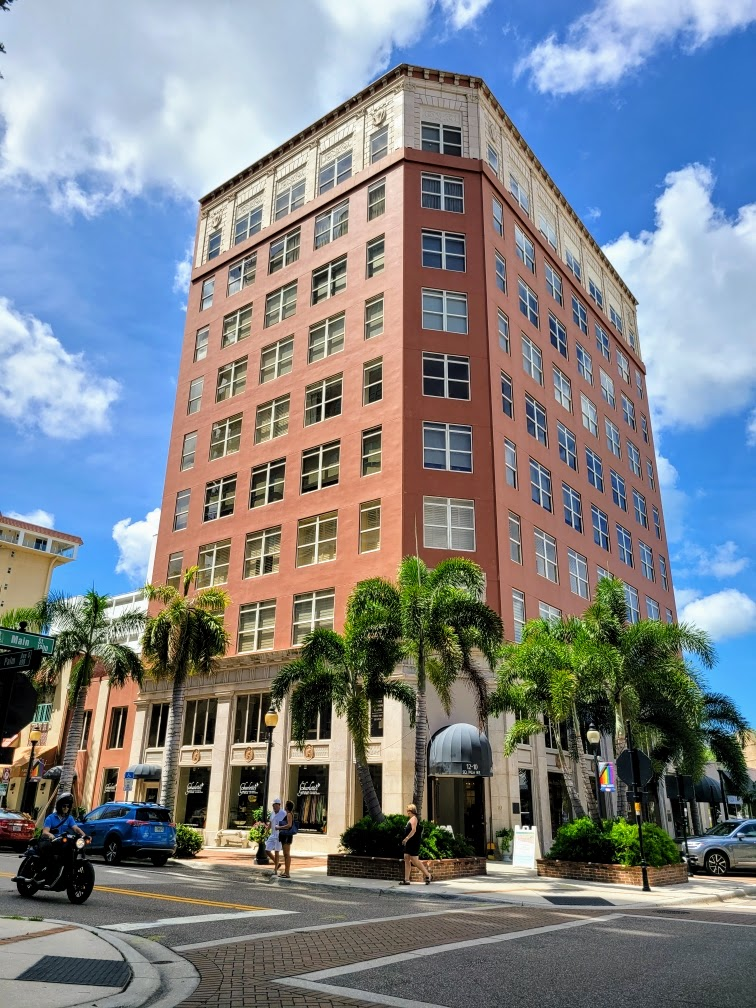
American National Bank Building
