= Karl A. Bickel =

American journalist

Karl August Bickel (January 20, 1882 – December 1972) was a journalist, press company leader, author, and civic leader in the United States. He visited Sarasota in 1928 and retired there in 1935, becoming active in various civic projects, historic site preservation, and infrastructure improvement plans.

He was born in Geneseo, Illinois. He attended Stanford University. He worked at the News and Examiner in San Francisco before joining United Press in San Francisco in 1907, the same year it was founded. Later that year he became its first manager in Portland, Oregon. He left and edited of the mSaioy News in Grand Junction, Colorado before rejoining United Press in 1913 as a salesman. From 1923 to 1935 he headed United Press. Afterwards he chaired the board of Scripps Howard Radio, Inc., and went to live in Sarasota.

He married Helen Madira Davis (died 1964). He and his wife visited Moscow in the Soviet Union, China, and Japan. He wrote a letter discussing his travel plans with his wife and the U.S. involvement in the attempted overthrow of Fidel Castro in Cuba.

He was interviewed in 1923. He was the commencement speaker at Marquette University in 1925. In an article he wrote for n the birthplaces on conquistadors, he wrote approvingly of Ruth Matilda Anderson's descriptions of Extremadura. He and his wife went to Brazil.

He was survived by his sister Sarah Bickel Payne of Lynchburg, Virginia. The John and Mable Ringling Museum of Art has a collection of his correspondence.

He lived in the Burns Realty Company–Karl Bickel House designed by Dwight James Baum. He donated the Madira Bickel Mound State Archaeological Site to the state of Florida. In 1946 he was elected president of the Florida Historical Society.

An exhibition was held at the Ringling Museum in his honor after his death.

== Writings ==
- Mangrove Coast Story West Florida (1942) with photographs by Walker Evans

=== Articles ===
- "Earning a Living at Stanford" (1905)
- '"Birthplaces of the Conquistadors" Historical Quarterly Vol. 36 No. 1 (1957)

== See also ==
- Jeff LaHurd
