= Frank and Matilda Binz House =

Historic house in Florida, United States

- U.S. National Register of Historic Places
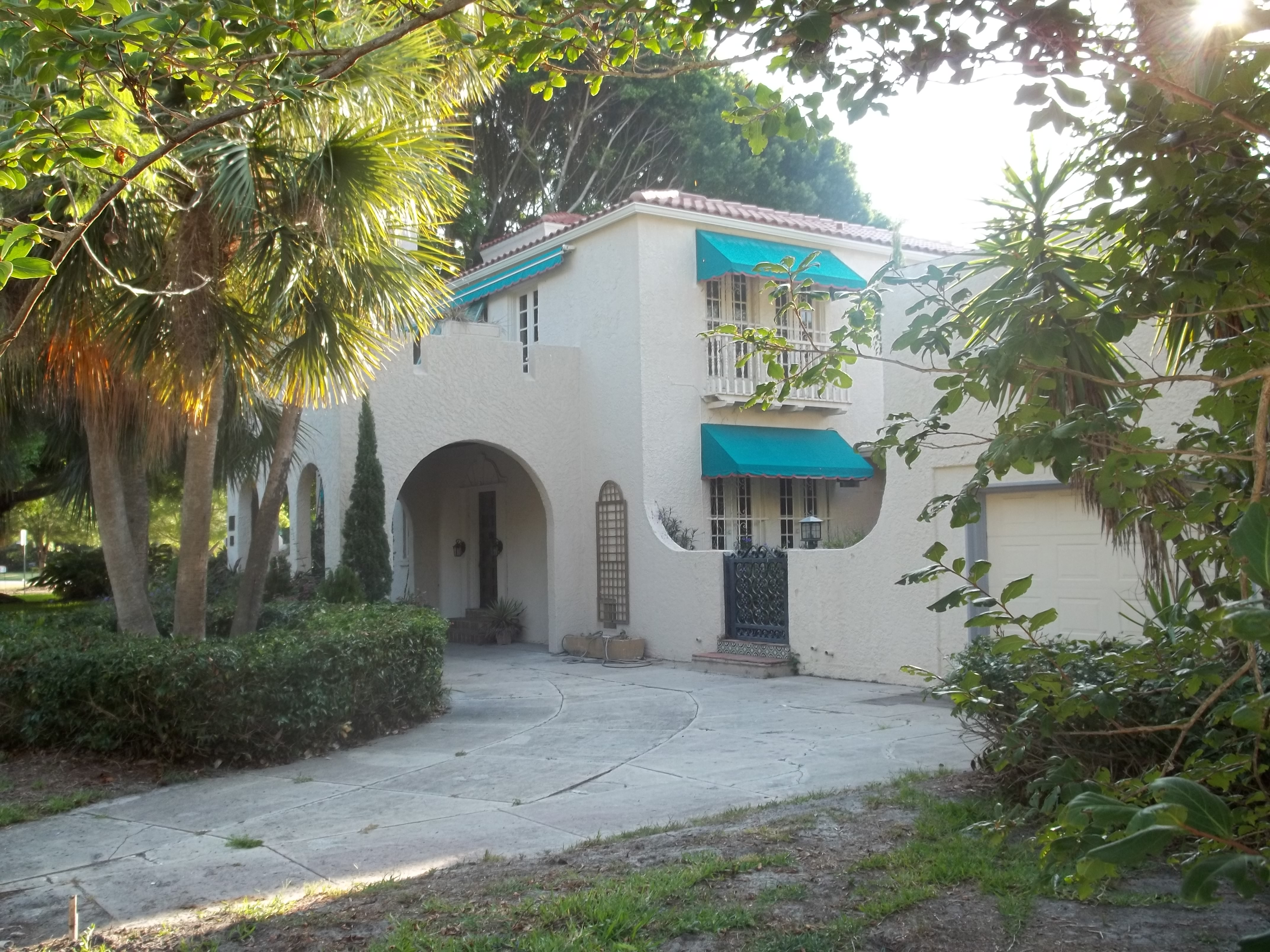

- Location within Florida Location within the United States
- Location: 5050 Bay Shore Road, Sarasota, Florida
- Coordinates: 27°22′40″N 82°33′36″W
- Built: 1926
- Architect: Clarence C. Hosmer
- Architectural style: Mission/Spanish Revival
- NRHP reference No.: 94000736
- Added to NRHP: August 5, 1994

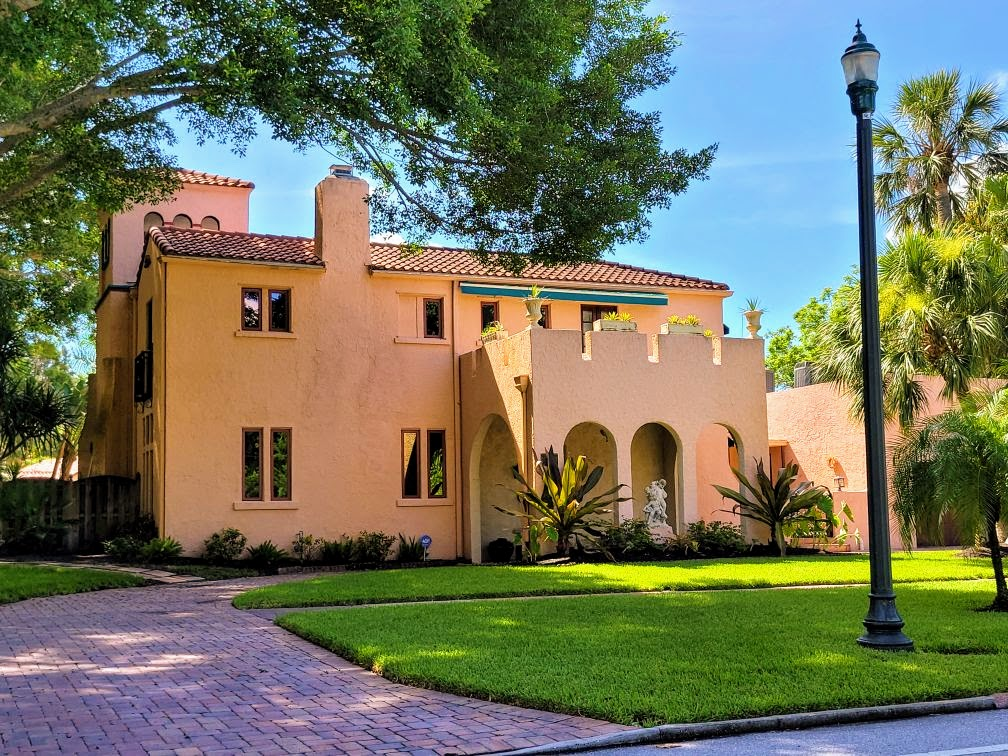
Frank and Matilda Binz House July 2022

The Frank and Matilda Binz House is a historic two-story Mediterranean Revival home located in Sarasota, Florida. Built in 1926 for Frank Binz, it is located at 5050 Bay Shore Road. On August 5, 1994, it was added to the U.S. National Register of Historic Places.

== See also ==
- National Register of Historic Places listings in Sarasota County, Florida

== References and external links ==
- Sarasota County listings at National Register of Historic Places
- Frank and Matilda Binz House at Portal of Historic Resources, State of Florida
