= Bay Haven School =

- U.S. National Register of Historic Places
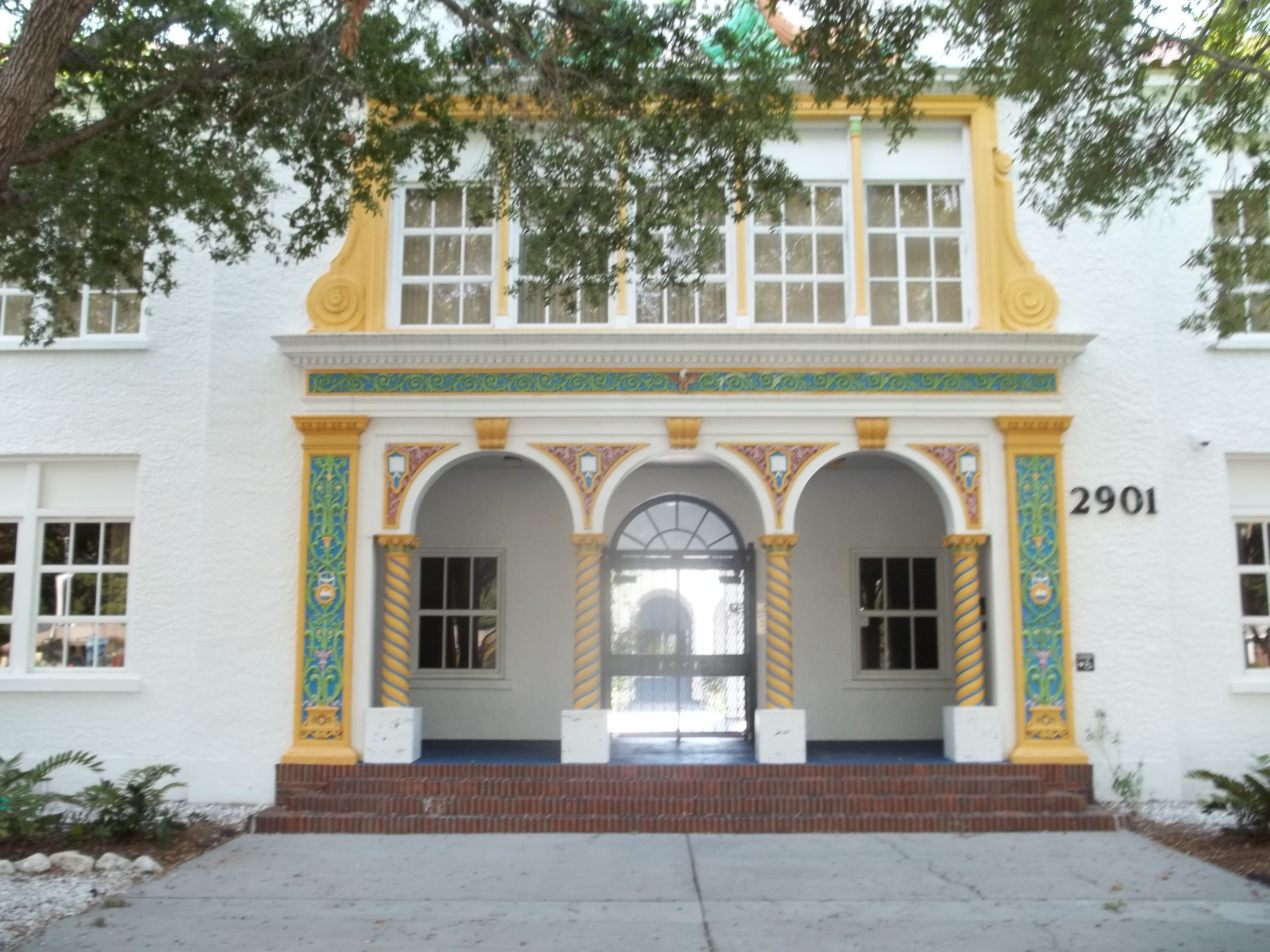

- Location within Florida Location within the United States
- Location: Sarasota, Florida
- Coordinates: 27°21′42″N 82°33′6″W
- Architectural style: Mission/Spanish Revival
- MPS: Sarasota MRA
- NRHP reference No.: 84003904
- Added to NRHP: April 23, 1984

The Bay Haven School is a historic former school in Sarasota, Florida, United States at 2901 West Tamiami Circle.

== History ==
The Bay Haven School opened in 1926. M. Leo Elliott was the architect and it was built for $77,000. A Mediterranean Revival style school building, it was built at the advice of city planner John Nolen who recommended that two schools be built in the outlying residential areas of the city located in the north and south. It would be racially integrated in 1962 being the first elementary school in the county to do so along with the first to have a Kindergarten in it starting in 1964.

African American students were integrated at it in 1962. A historical marker commemorates the school's history. On April 23, 1984, it was added to the U.S. National Register of Historic Places.

== See also ==
- National Register of Historic Places listings in Sarasota County, Florida
