= Sarasota MRA =

- U.S. National Register of Historic Places
- Location within Florida Location within the United States
- Location: Sarasota, Florida
- Coordinates: 27°20′14″N 82°32′07″W
- MPS: Sarasota MRA
- NRHP reference No.: 64000120

The following buildings were added to the National Register of Historic Places (NRHP) as part of the Sarasota Multiple Resource Area MRA.

Resource Name	Also known as	Address	City	County	Added
Atlantic Coast Line Passenger Depot		1 South School Avenue	Sarasota	Sarasota	March 22, 1984
Bacon and Tomlin, Inc.		201 South Palm Avenue	Sarasota	Sarasota	March 22, 1984
Bay Haven School		2901 West Tamiami Circle	Sarasota	Sarasota	April 23, 1984
Burns Court Historic District		400-446 Burns Court and 418, 426, and 446 South Pineapple Avenue	Sarasota	Sarasota	March 22, 1984
Burns Realty Company-Karl Bickel House		101 North Tamiami Trail	Sarasota	Sarasota	March 5, 1987
City Waterworks		1015 North Orange Avenue	Sarasota	Sarasota	April 23, 1984
F. A. DeCanizares House		1215 North Palm Avenue	Sarasota	Sarasota	March 22, 1984
DeMarcay Hotel		27 South Palm Avenue	Sarasota	Sarasota	March 22, 1984
Edwards Theatre		57 North Pineapple Avenue	Sarasota	Sarasota	March 22, 1984
El Vernona Apartments-Broadway Apartments		1133 4th Street	Sarasota	Sarasota	March 22, 1984
El Vernona Hotel-John Ringling Hotel		111 North Tamiami Trail	Sarasota	Sarasota	March 5, 1987
Frances-Carlton Apartments		1221-1227 North Palm Avenue	Sarasota	Sarasota	March 22, 1984
Dr. Joseph Halton House		308 Cocoanut Avenue	Sarasota	Sarasota	March 22, 1984
S. H. Kress Building		1442 Main Street	Sarasota	Sarasota	March 22, 1984
Capt. W. F. Purdy House		3315 Bayshore Road	Sarasota	Sarasota	March 22, 1984
L. D. Reagin House		1213 North Palm Avenue	Sarasota	Sarasota	October 25, 1984
Roth Cigar Factory		30 Mira Mar Court	Sarasota	Sarasota	March 22, 1984
Sarasota County Courthouse		2000 Main Street	Sarasota	Sarasota	March 22, 1984
Sarasota Herald Building		539 South Orange Avenue	Sarasota	Sarasota	March 22, 1984
Sarasota High School		1001 South Tamiami Trail	Sarasota	Sarasota	March 22, 1984
Sarasota Times Building		1214-1216 1st Street	Sarasota	Sarasota	March 22, 1984
Sarasota Woman's Club		1241 North Palm Avenue	Sarasota	Sarasota	January 18, 1985
South Side School		1901 Webber Street	Sarasota	Sarasota	September 14, 1984
U.S. Post Office-Federal Building		111 South Orange Avenue	Sarasota	Sarasota	March 22, 1984
H. B. William House		1509 South Orange Avenue	Sarasota	Sarasota	March 22, 1984
Dr. C. B. Wilson House		235 South Orange Avenue	Sarasota	Sarasota	March 22, 1984
