= Bacon and Tomlin, Inc. =

- U.S. National Register of Historic Places
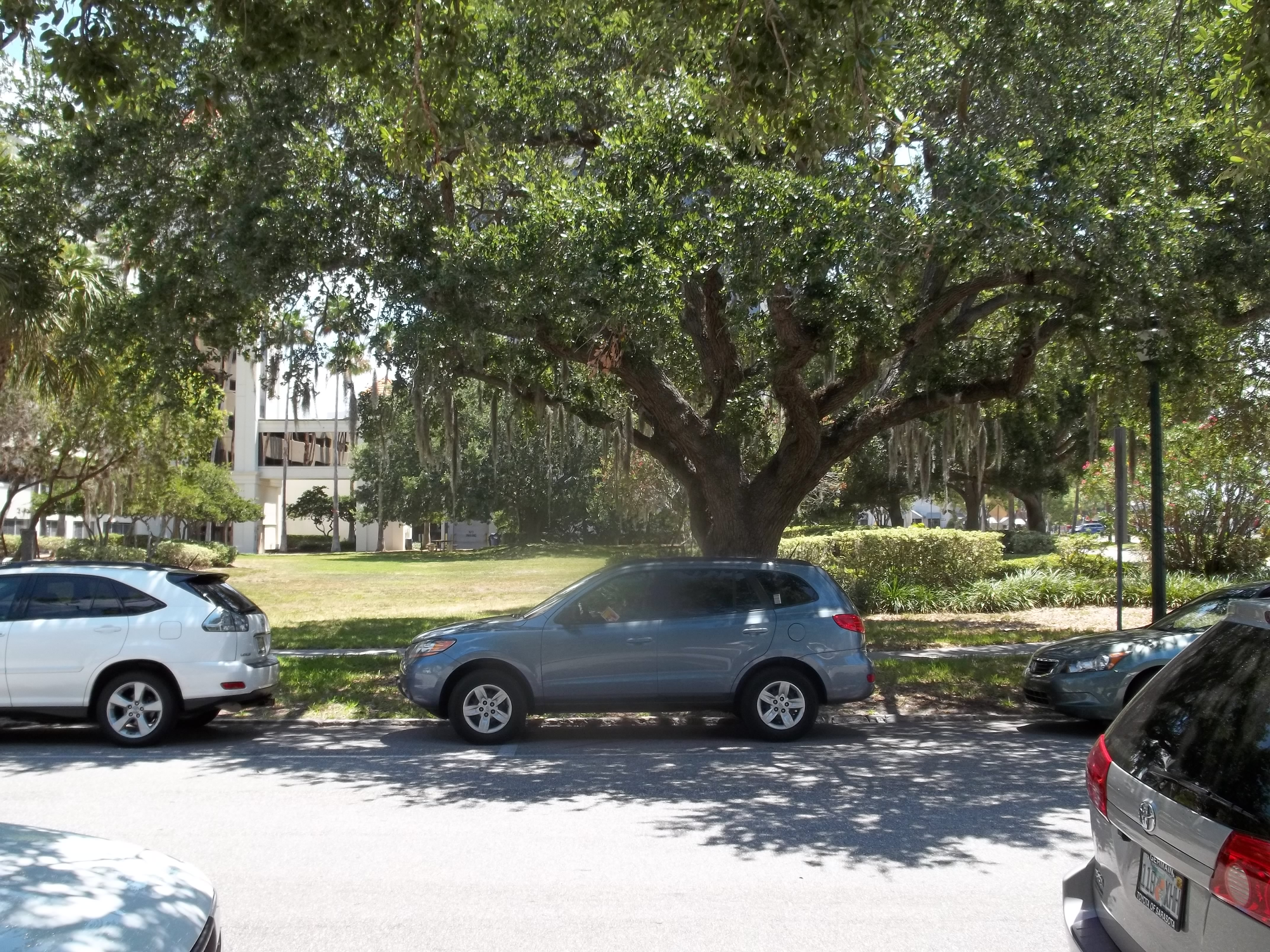
- Original site of building, which has been demolished

- Location within Florida
- Location: Sarasota, Florida
- Coordinates: 27°20′2″N 82°32′30″W
- Area: Less than 1 acre (0.40 ha)
- Built: 1925
- Architectural style: Mediterranean Revival
- MPS: Sarasota MRA
- NRHP reference No.: 84003829
- Added to NRHP: March 22, 1984

The Bacon and Tomlin, Inc. is a historic building in Sarasota, Florida, United States at 201 South Palm Avenue. On March 22, 1984, it was added to the U.S. National Register of Historic Places. Built sometime before 1925, it served as the real estate and insurance office of Bacon and Tomlin, Inc.

== See also ==
- National Register of Historic Places listings in Sarasota County, Florida
