= Hermitage–Whitney Historic District =

Historic district in Florida, United States

- U.S. National Register of Historic Places
- U.S. Historic district
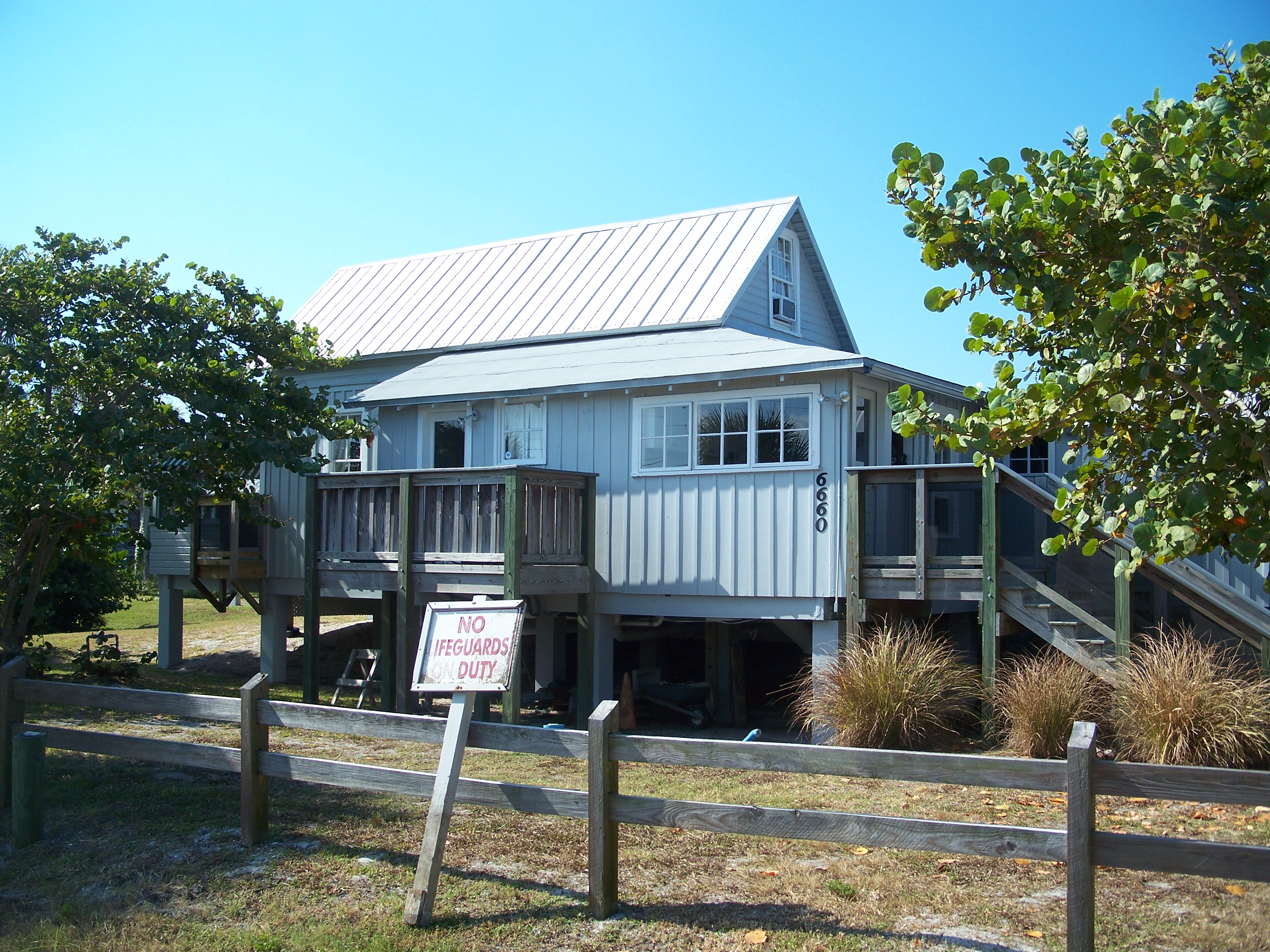

- Location within Florida Location within the United States
- Location: Englewood, Florida
- Coordinates: 26°57′43″N 82°23′01″W
- Area: 35 acres (0.14 km^{2})
- NRHP reference No.: 02001261
- Added to NRHP: October 31, 2002

The Hermitage–Whitney Historic District is a U.S. historic district.

The Hermitage Artist Retreat is situated along Manasota Key, a barrier island on the shores of Englewood, Florida. Its nine-acre beachfront campus includes five historic buildings and three structures.

It was added to the National Register of Historic Places in October 2002.

== History ==
Throughout its more than a century of life, the property at 6660 Manasota Key Road has served many different purposes in the surrounding community.

=== Earliest settlers ===
What is now a peaceful, beachside “escape-to-create” residence for global artists began as a simple homestead for a family of immigrants building a new life. In 1907, the land was purchased by Carl Johansen, a Swedish immigrant and sawmill owner. Johansen made a living for his family by rafting his lumber across Lemon Bay. After the family's departure in 1916, the land passed through the hands of several owners.

=== Nudist colony ===
The 1930s saw the property's most notorious period of ownership. Dubbed The Sea Island Sanctuary, the short-lived nudist colony charged a monthly membership rate of $45. A brochure ca. 1936 advertised:

“The isolation of our location permits the practice of nudism 24 hours a day if desired; also one may stroll nude for miles along the shores of the gulf. We have the friendship of the authorities and the good will of the community. What more could be desired of a nudist resort? This coupled with the excellent food, plenty of warm sunshine and congenial companionship, is the ultimate.”

=== Subsequent owners ===
The 1940s saw the expansion of the property. A guest house was added by Louise Plummer in 1937, while a separate retreat adjacent to Hermitage property was built by Alfred Whitney. The two parcels were later combined by Otto Thurston Alexander in 1947.

Writer Ruth Swayze and her daughter Carroll Swayze, an artist, leased the Hermitage from 1975 to 1986. During this time, the two led a community effort to preserve the property from beach erosion. Much of the credit for the historic buildings’ survival today is given to these two dedicated women.

In 1988 the property was sold to Sarasota County Parks and Recreation by Ryder Home & Groves. The county intended to repurpose it for use as a parking lot for the nearby public beach. However, concerns were raised by the community and the historic structures were saved from demolition.

=== Restoration ===
The community-led campaign to preserve the Hermitage's historical structures continued throughout the 1990s. In 1999 a Comprehensive Community Cultural Plan was created by the Sarasota County Arts Council (today the Arts and Cultural Alliance of Sarasota County), which identified the site's potential as an artist's retreat. Sarasota architect Bob Town undertook the renovation of the historic buildings under the funding and leadership of the Arts Council. Today, the property is leased from Sarasota County for a symbolic $1/year. Care is overseen by the Sarasota County Parks and Recreation Department.

Additional funding was also secured from local arts-related community organizations and private donors.

The Hermitage's first executive director was Bruce Rodgers.

== The Hermitage ==
Today, The Hermitage survives as a dedicated place for artists from all over the globe to seek inspiration and practice their craft. Disciplines include visual arts, music, theater, literature, and creative areas.

Artists are selected by the Hermitage's Curatorial Council, an advisory panel of prominent artists in different disciplines. There is no pressure for artists to complete their intended projects. Hermitage Fellows have included nine Pulitzer Prize winners, along with multiple Tony, Emmy, Grammy and MacArthur Fellowship award winners.

== See also ==
- National Register of Historic Places listings in Sarasota County, Florida
