= Appleby Building =

- U.S. National Register of Historic Places
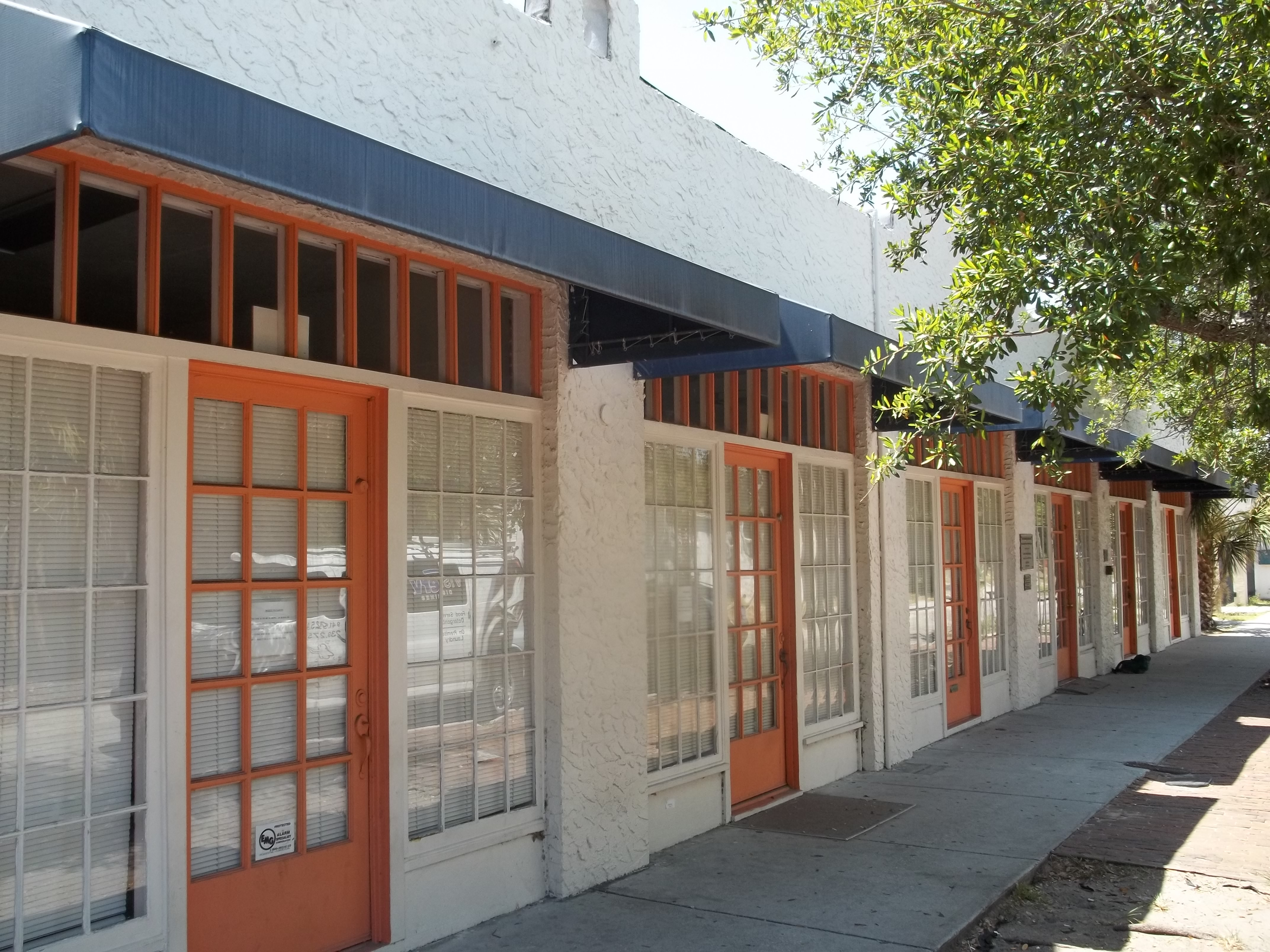

- Location within Florida Location within the United States
- Location: Sarasota, Florida
- Coordinates: 27°20′24″N 82°32′26″W
- NRHP reference No.: 01000683
- Added to NRHP: June 28, 2001

{The Appleby Building (also known as the Resurrection House) is a historic site in Sarasota, Florida, United States. It is located at 501-513 Kumquat Court. On June 28, 2001, it was added to the U.S. National Register of Historic Places. It had stores and light industry in it.

== See also ==
- National Register of Historic Places listings in Sarasota County, Florida
