= Waters and Elsa Burrows Historic District =

- U.S. National Register of Historic Places
- U.S. Historic district
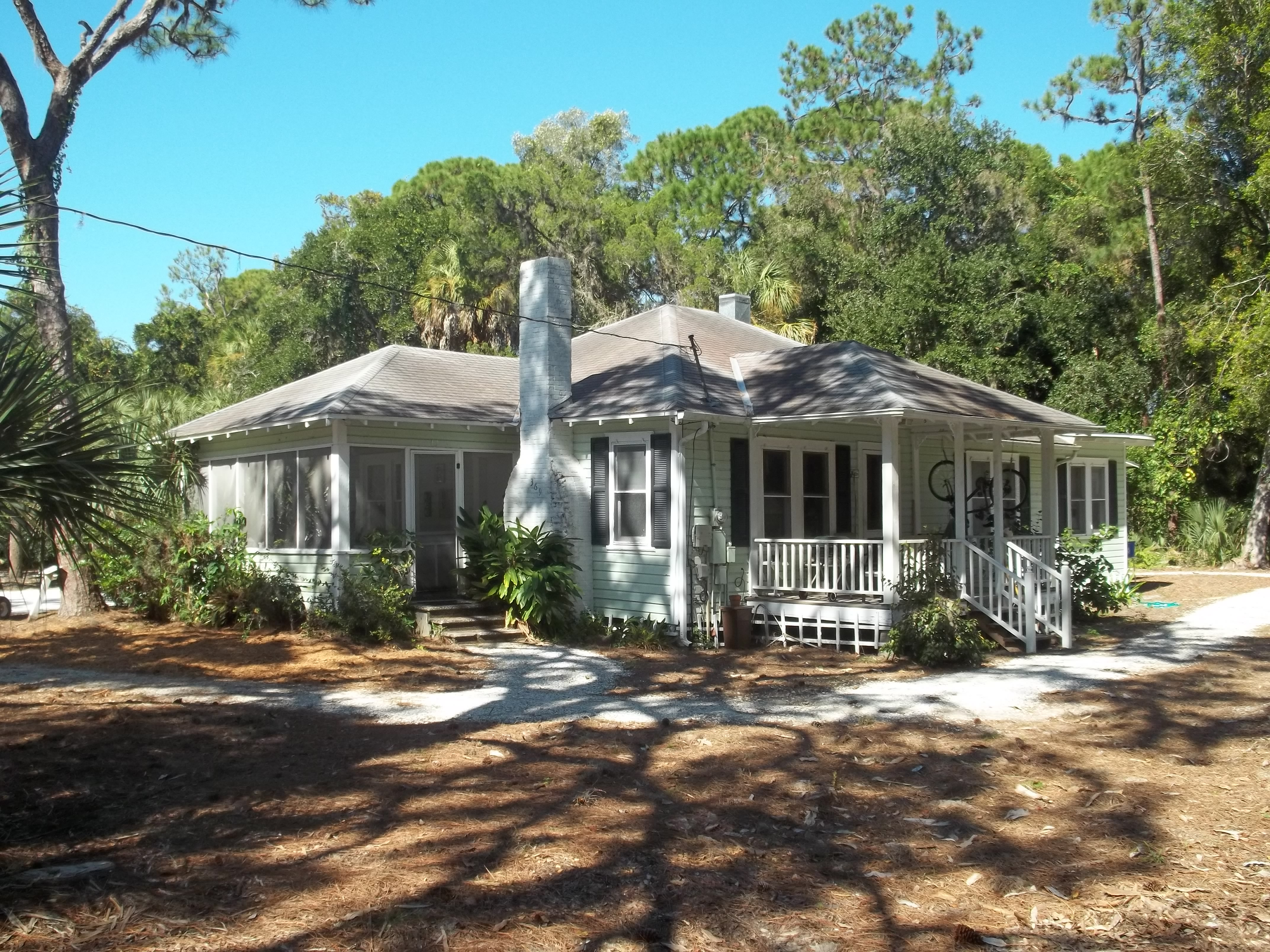
- House in the district

- Location within Florida Location within the United States
- Location: Osprey, Florida
- Coordinates: 27°12′09″N 82°29′36″W
- NRHP reference No.: 11001077
- Added to NRHP: February 3, 2012

Waters and Elsa Burrows Historic District is a U.S. historic district in Osprey, Florida south of Sarasota in Sarasota County. It includes the Bay Preserve at Osprey on Little Sarasota Bay. The district was added to the National Register of Historic Places on February 3, 2012.

The property was next to one owned by Bertha Palmer. Elsa Maria Scherer Burrows donated the land across U.S. 41 that became Oscar Scherer State Park, named for her father, a leather tanning businessman who immigrated from Germany. Her residence was acquired by a surgeon from New York City.

== Burrows-Matson Residence ==
The district includes the historic 1931 Burrows-Matson Residence property at 400 Palmetto Avenue conserved as the Bay Preserve at Osprey by the Conservation Foundation of the Gulf Coast. The property includes a historic brick residential building, carriage house, and pavilion, pier and dock. The property is privately owned by the Conservation Foundation of the Gulf Coast and is open free of cost to the public. It is used by rowing organizations and can be rented for parties or weddings. An organizer of the foundation is a relative of Bertha Palmer. Fundraisers have included local dignitaries.

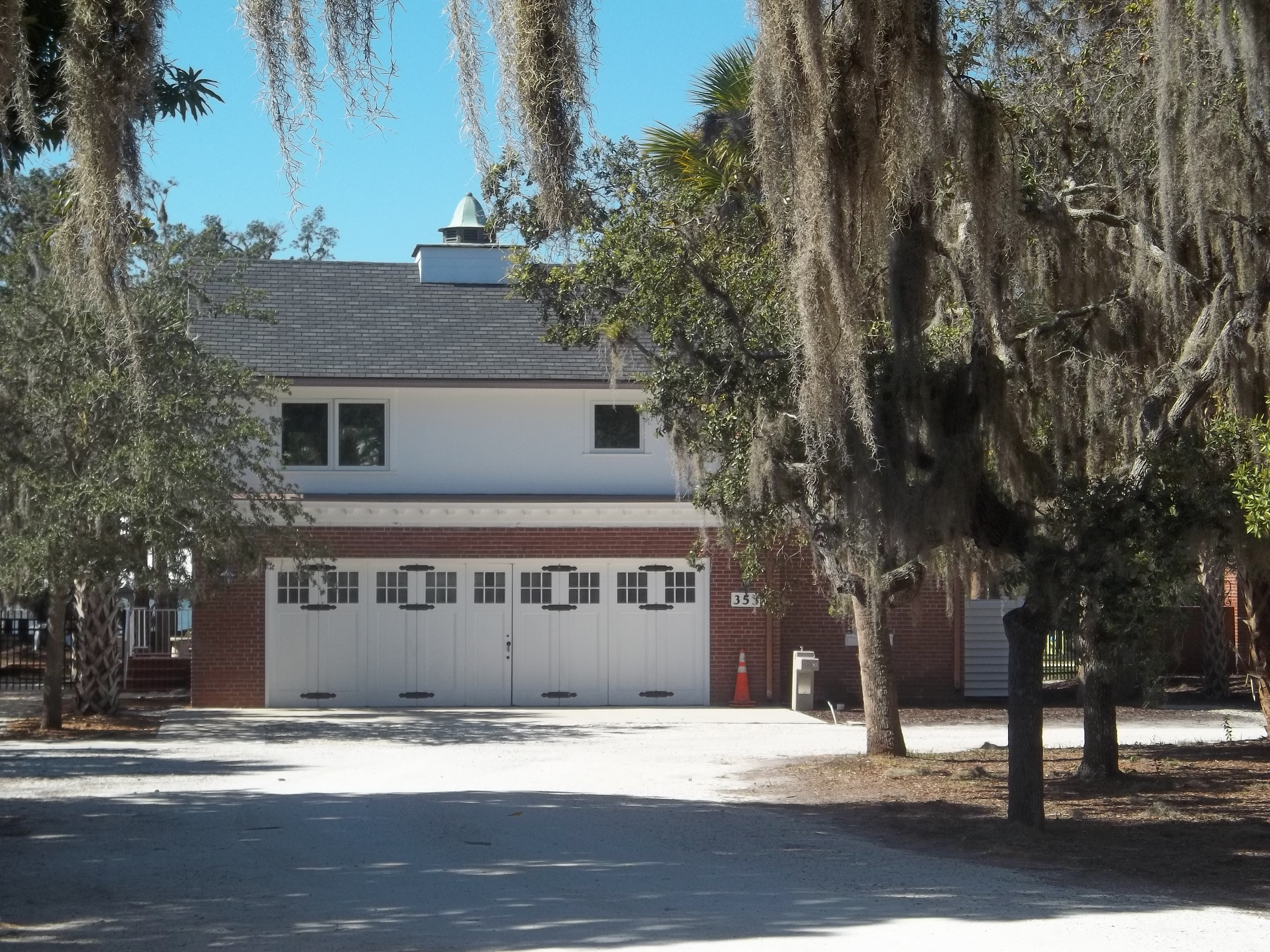

Spanish Point, now a campus of the Marie Selby Botanical Gardens, is adjacent.
