= F. A. DeCanizares House =

Historic house in Florida, United States

- F.A. DeCanizares House
- U.S. National Register of Historic Places
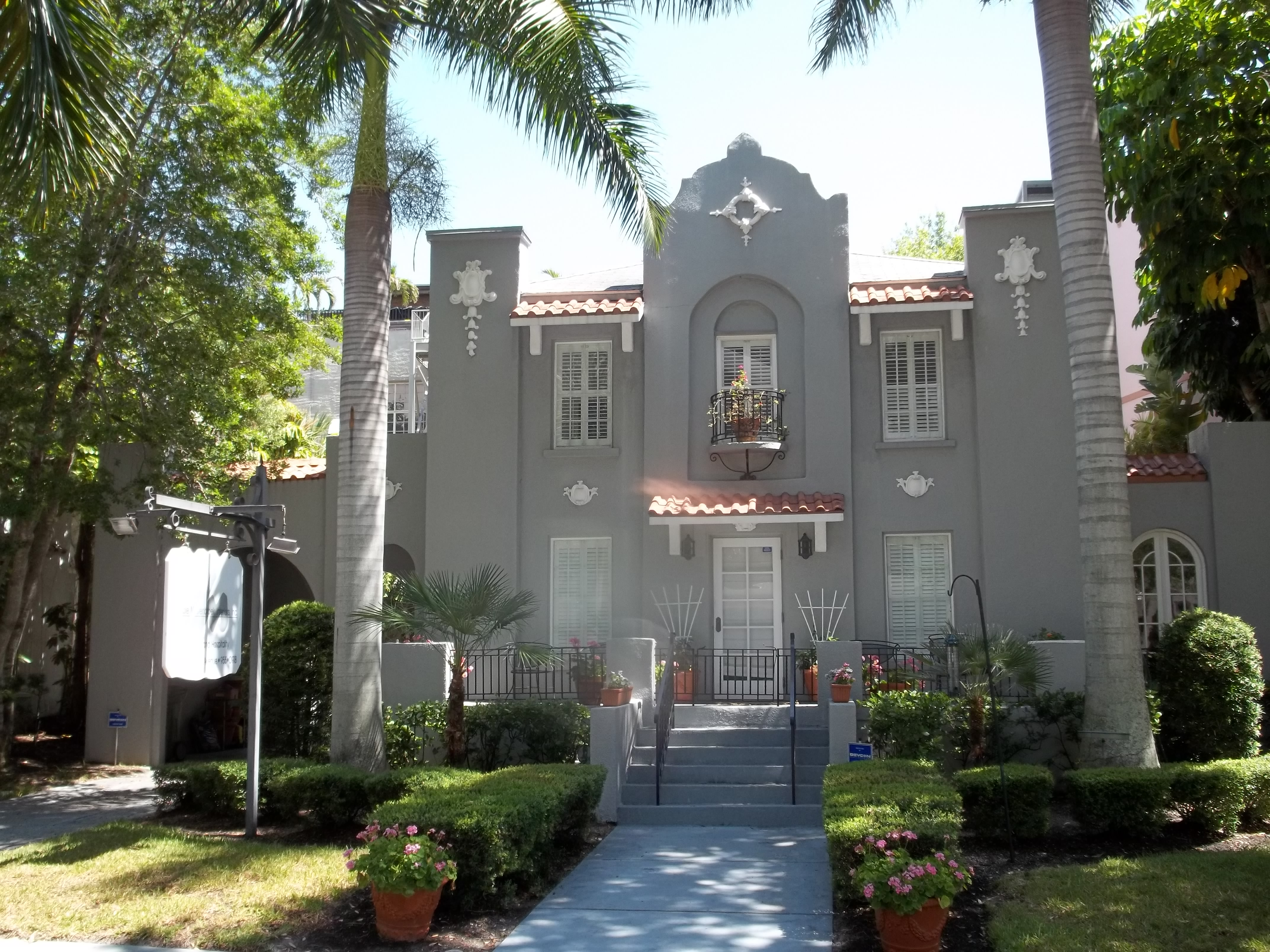

- Location within Florida Location within the United States
- Location: Sarasota, Florida
- Coordinates: 27°20′11″N 82°32′46″W
- MPS: Sarasota MRA
- NRHP reference No.: 84003833
- Added to NRHP: March 22, 1984

The F.A. DeCanizares House is a historic home in Sarasota, Florida. It is located at 1215 North Palm Avenue. On March 22, 1984, it was added to the U.S. National Register of Historic Places.
