= City Waterworks, Sarasota =

- City Waterworks
- U.S. National Register of Historic Places
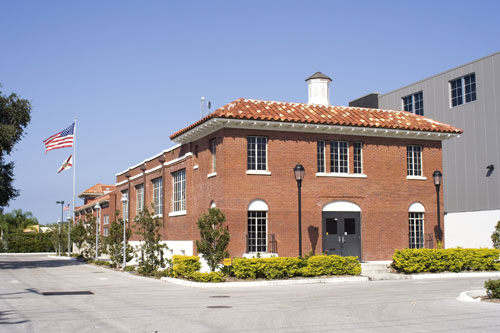

- Location within Florida Location within the United States
- Location: 1005 North Orange Avenue; Sarasota, Florida
- Coordinates: 27°20′41″N 82°32′22″W
- Built: 1926
- MPS: Sarasota MRA
- NRHP reference No.: 84003831
- Added to NRHP: April 23, 1984

The City Waterworks is a historic site in Sarasota, Florida. It is located at 1005 North Orange Avenue. On April 23, 1984, it was added to the U.S. National Register of Historic Places.

== History ==
The Sarasota Water Works building is a two-story red brick Mediterranean Revival building built in 1926. The western end of the building served as a pumping station, and the eastern end as an office for the city's Water Works. The building's architecture was by Bohmer-Reinhart & Company.

By the early 1970s, the building was abandoned. In 2002, a private buyer bought the building from the city and restored it, creating an office space. In February 2018, the building was purchased by Robin Jennings and Rachel McAree for $1.3 million and repurposed into a business and social club.
