= Dr. C. B. Wilson House =

Historic house in Florida, United States

- U.S. National Register of Historic Places
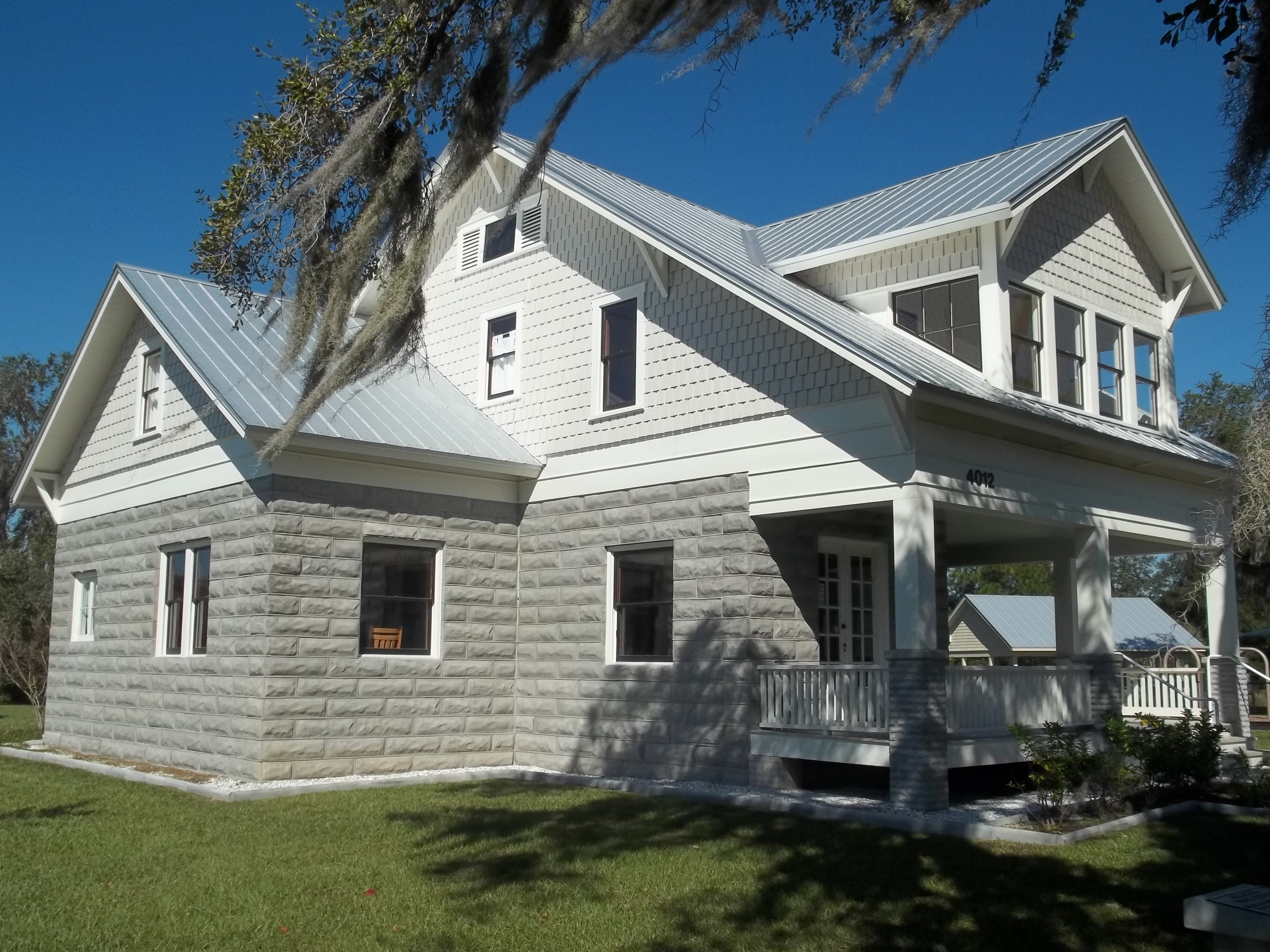
- The Wilson House located inside Urfer Family Park
- Interactive map of Dr. C. B. Wilson House
- Location: Sarasota, Florida
- Coordinates: 27°17′50″N 82°27′55″W
- MPS: Sarasota MRA
- NRHP reference No.: 84003849
- Added to NRHP: March 22, 1984

The Dr. C. B. Wilson House (also known as the Office of Fuller, Breslau, and Stinnett Attorneys) is a historic home in Sarasota, Florida. On March 22, 1984, it was added to the U.S. National Register of Historic Places. It originally was located at 235 South Orange Avenue. In 2004, the house was planned to be demolished for the construction of a bank on the site. Funds were raised, and the house was moved to 4012 Honore Avenue inside of Urfer Family Park. Today, the house is open for self-guided tours to the public.
