= Dr. Joseph Halton House =

Historic house in Florida, United States

- U.S. National Register of Historic Places
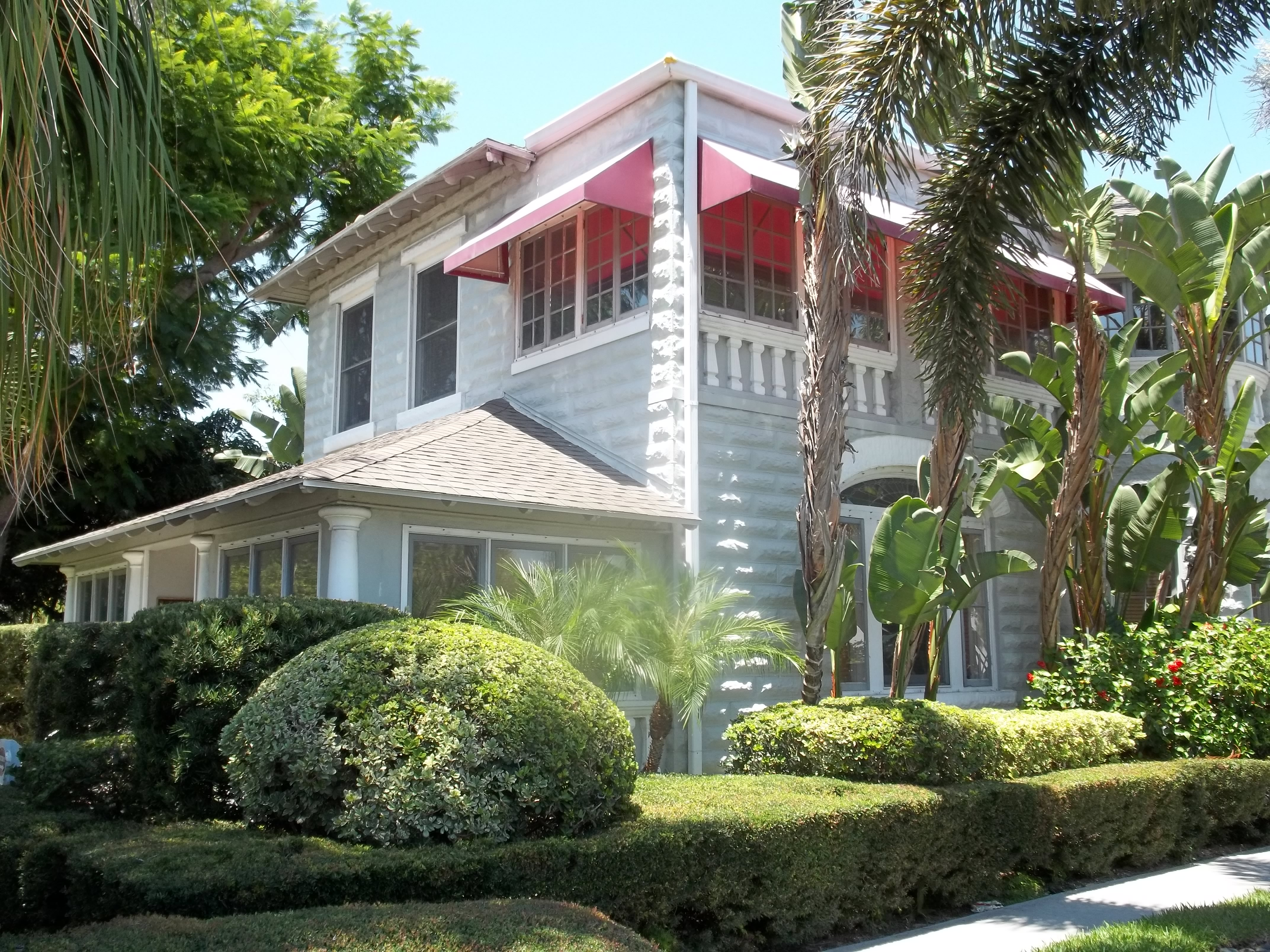

- Location within Florida Location within the United States
- Location: Sarasota, Florida
- Coordinates: 27°20′19″N 82°32′41″W
- Architectural style: Queen Anne
- MPS: Sarasota MRA
- NRHP reference No.: 84003838
- Added to NRHP: March 22, 1984

The Dr. Joseph Halton House is a historic home in Sarasota, Florida. It is located at 308 Cocoanut Avenue. On March 22, 1984, it was added to the U.S. National Register of Historic Places.
