= H. B. William House =

Historic house in Florida, United States

- H.B. William House
- U.S. National Register of Historic Places
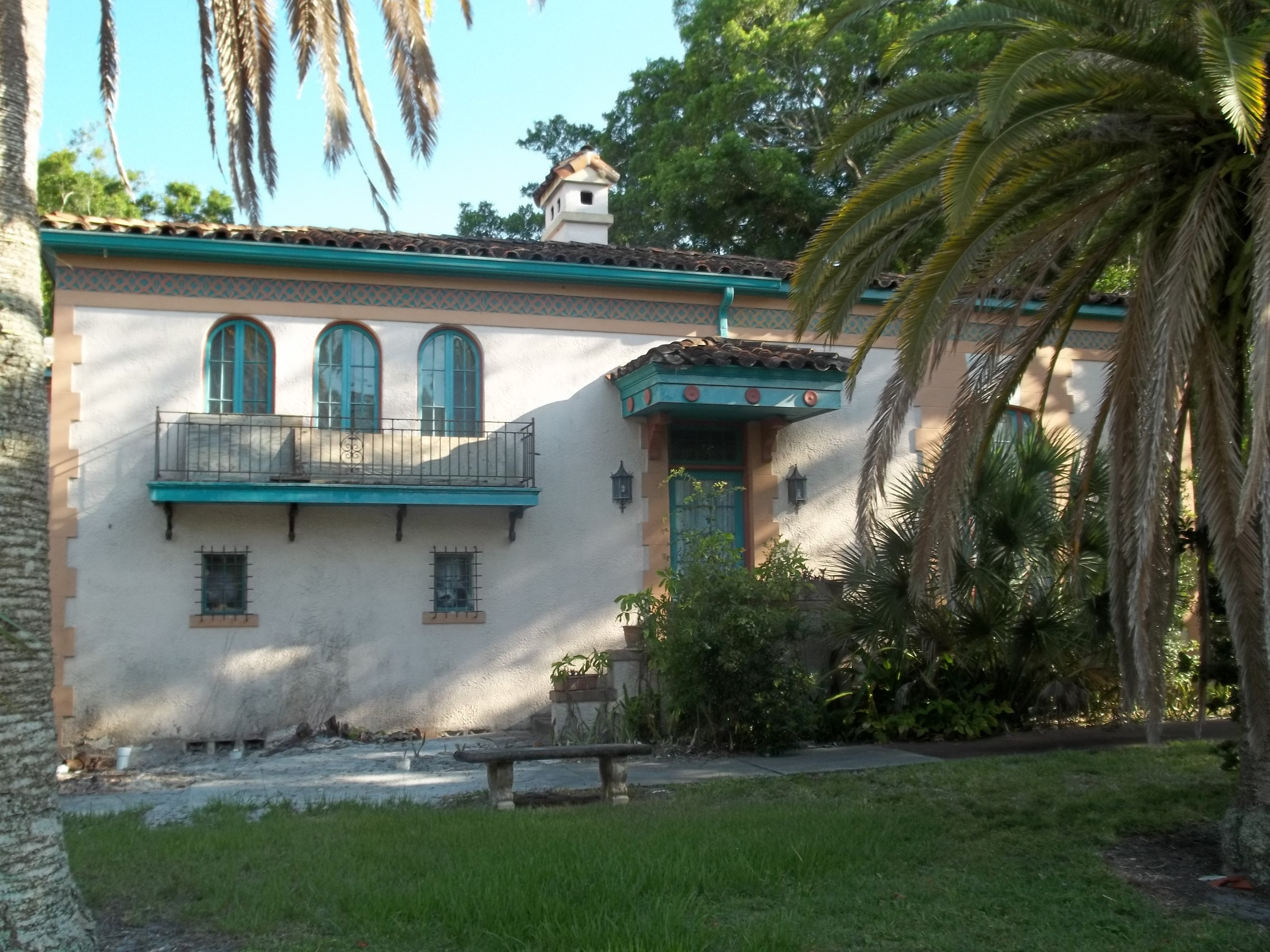

- Location within Florida Location within the United States
- Location: Sarasota, Florida
- Coordinates: 27°19′10″N 82°32′16″W
- MPS: Sarasota MRA
- NRHP reference No.: 84003848
- Added to NRHP: March 22, 1984

The H.B. William House is a historic house located at 1509 South Orange Avenue in Sarasota, Florida.

== Description and history ==
The two-story, Mediterranean Revival style house was designed by prominent local architect Thomas Reed Martin and was completed by mid-December 1926. It was added to the National Register of Historic Places on March 22, 1984.
