= Eagle Point Historic District =

Historic district in Florida, United States

- U.S. National Register of Historic Places
- U.S. Historic district
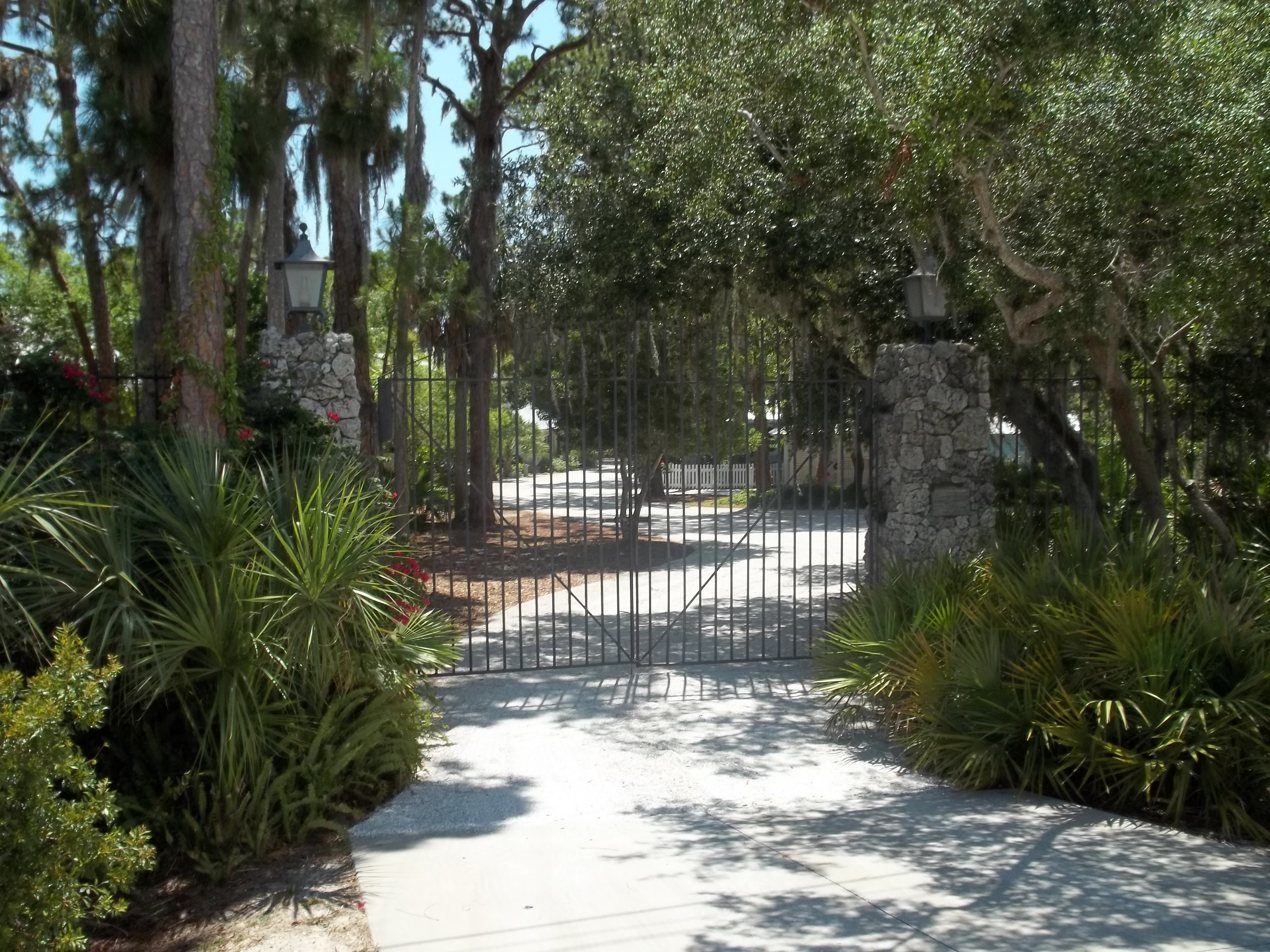
- Entry gate

- Location within Florida Location within the United States
- Location: Venice, Florida
- Coordinates: 27°6′31″N 82°26′46″W
- Area: 1-acre (4,000 m^{2})
- NRHP reference No.: 91001448
- Added to NRHP: October 3, 1991

The Eagle Point Historic District (also known as Eagle Point Camp) is a U.S. historic district (designated as such on October 3, 1991) located in Venice, Florida. The district is at 759 North Tamiami Trail. It contains 19 historic buildings and 1 structure.
