= American National Bank Building (Sarasota, Florida) =

- U.S. National Register of Historic Places
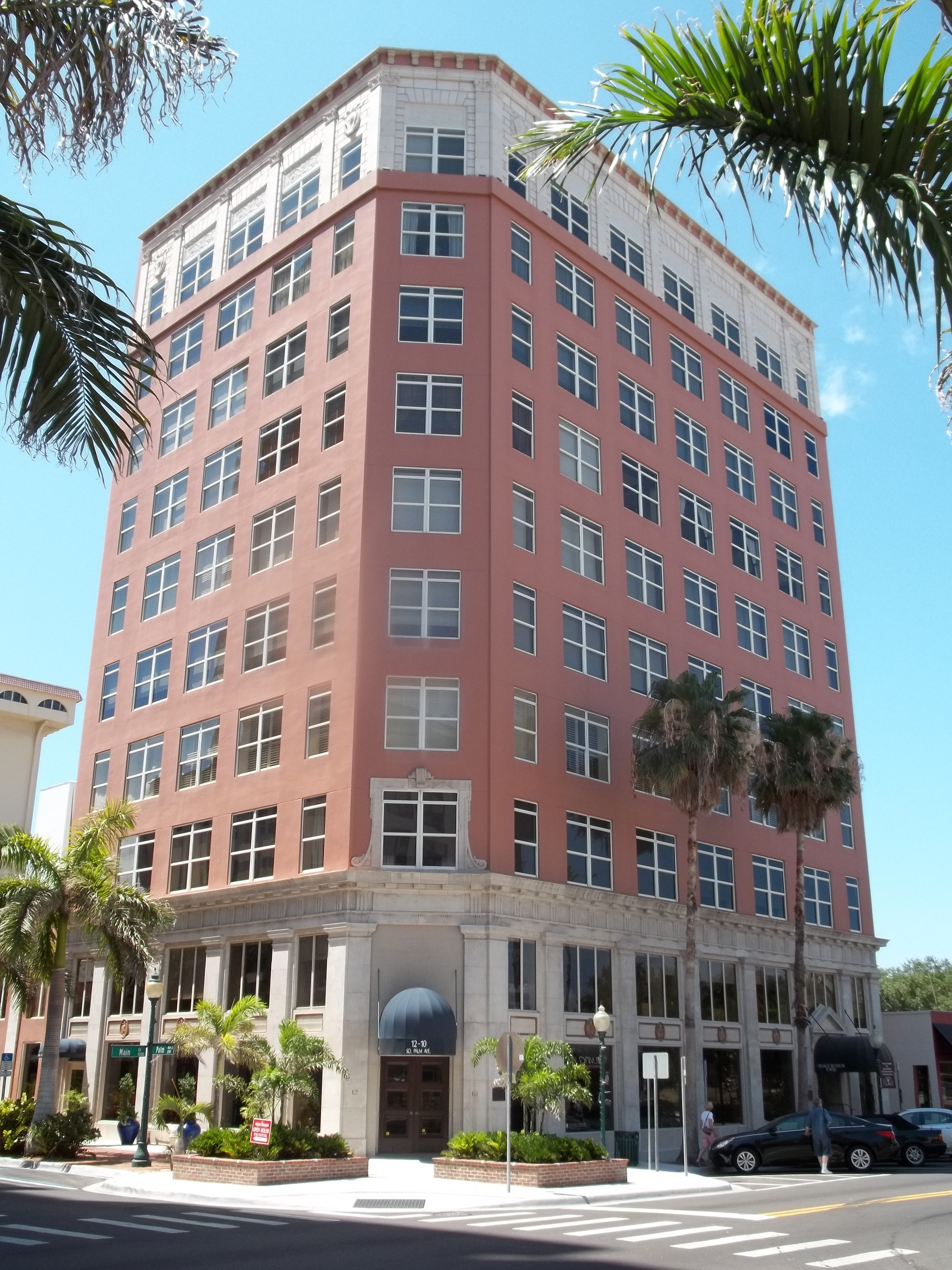

- Location within Florida Location within the United States
- Location: 1330 Main Street, Sarasota, Florida
- Coordinates: 27°20′6.1″N 82°32′36.75″W
- Area: less than one acre
- Built: 1926
- Architect: Francis Palmer Smith
- Architectural style: Classical Revival
- NRHP reference No.: 98001154
- Added to NRHP: September 9, 1998

The American National Bank Building (also known as the Orange Blossom Hotel) at 1330 Main Street in Sarasota, Florida, United States is a historic bank. It was also a hotel and a retirement home. It was added to the U.S. National Register of Historic Places in 1998.

== History ==
=== Construction and bank usage ===
The American National Bank was built on the former property of the Belle Haven Hotel, known earlier as the DeSoto Hotel, in 1886. The hotel in May 1925 was put for sale at a price of $533,000 ($7,574,000 in 2024) and was bought by the Adair Reality and Trust of Atlanta, Georgia. After purchasing the hotel, there were plans to tear it down and replace it with a new one. There had been rumors that it would be replaced with an office building. In March 1926, the foundations of the building were laid, with all building materials sent in before construction began, and by April 1926, it was 4 stories tall. On April 29, 1926, an article by The Week in Sarasota titled "New Belle Haven Hotel on Bay Front Marks New Epoch in History of Sarasota and Its Commanding Position as a Resort City." The cost of the building was estimated to be at about $3,000,000 to $3,500,000 (about $42,000,000 to $50,000,000 in 2024). In April 1926, the American National Bank moved into the new building.

=== Hotel usage ===
Sarasota in the 1930s saw a growth in tourism. In 1936, Joseph Spadaro from Boca Grande bought it and converted it into a hotel. It was described by R.L. Polk City Phone Directories as "a fireproof building built of steel and concrete, steam heat, and with 2 elevators and 125 rooms". There was a room called the Aztec Room, a cocktail lounge that was popular with tourists and residents in the area. The hotel was sold in 1946 to Louis Swed from Tampa and Associates for $225,000 (about $2,752,000 in 2024). There were plans to redo the hotel's rooms and add a coffee bar and a restaurant. In 1946, the Orange Blossom Hotel Corporation was formed, with Lewis Swed, Jack Shapiro, and M. B. Sullivan as executives. In 1950, the hotel was sold to Elizabeth Fitizie and Mrs. Thomas Kewley for $300,000 (worth about $3,100,000 in 2024). The new owners played a major role in the hotel's operations and the dining room. The hotel hosted Jimmy Roosevelt and Peter Lawford as notable guests. The hotel struggled during the 1950s and 1960s, when new hotels were opening in Sarasota.

=== Retirement facility ===
In 1967, it was announced that the trustees of the Sarasota non-profit foundation had purchased the hotel and would use it as a 60-room nursing home. The next year, the hotel was modernized and featured in the Building Magazine as a modernization citation. In the 1980s, many of its longtime tenants no longer occupied the building, leading to its closure.

== See also ==
- National Register of Historic Places listings in Sarasota County, Florida
