= Roth Cigar Factory =

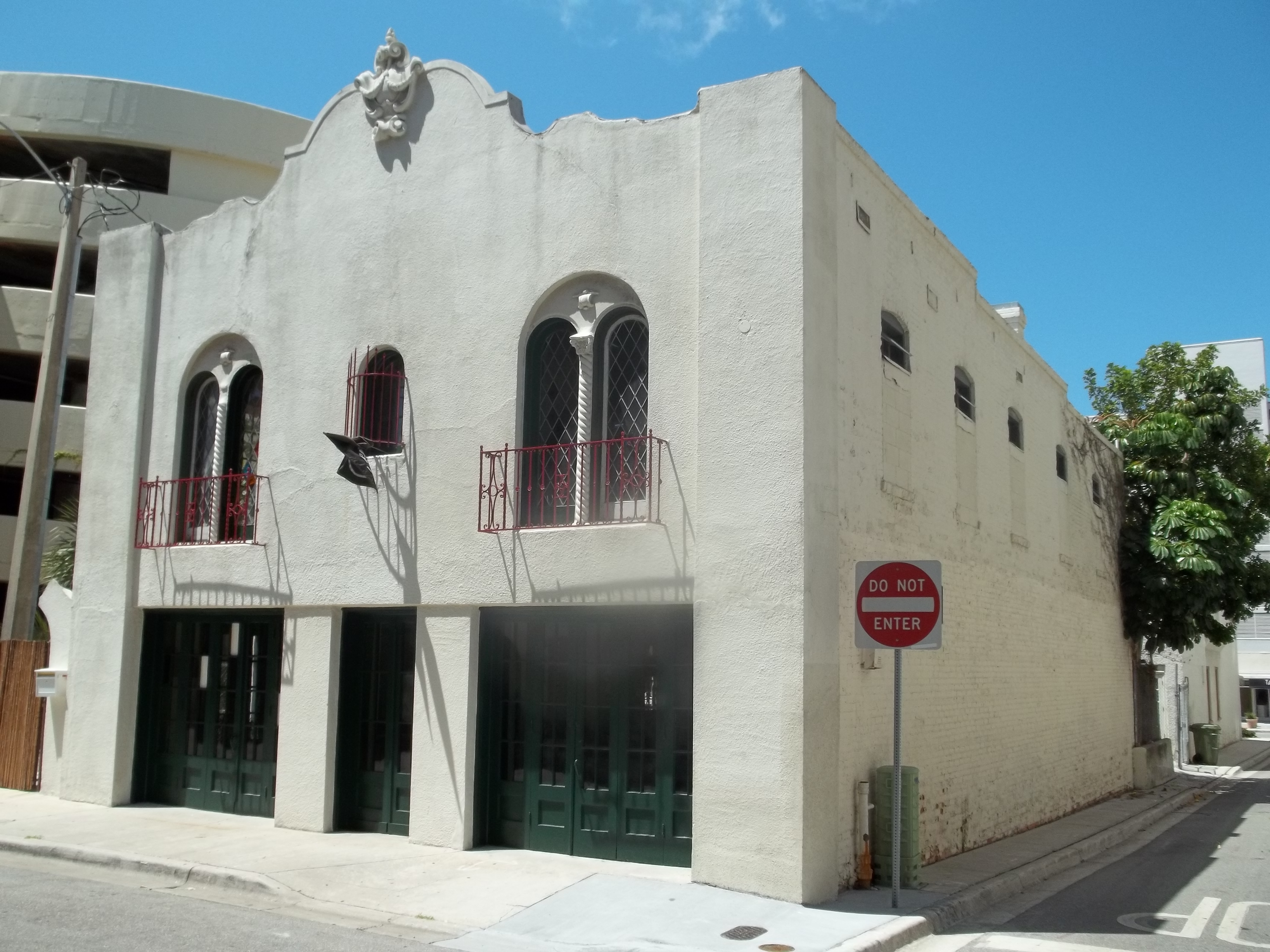
- Interactive map of the Roth Cigar Factory area

General information
- Status: Vacated
- Type: Cigar factory
- Architectural style: Mission/Spanish Revival
- Location: 30 Mira Mar Court, Sarasota, Florida, United States
- Coordinates: 27°20′4″N 82°32′27″W
- Construction started: 1922
- Completed: 1923
- Client: Edward Roth; Michael Roth
- Owner: Private

Technical details
- Floor count: 2
- Floor area: 3,940 ft^{2} (366 m^{2})

Design and construction
- Architect: Thomas Reed Martin
- Roth Cigar Factory
- U.S. National Register of Historic Places
- Location within Florida Location within the United States
- MPS: Sarasota MRA
- NRHP reference No.: 84003841
- Added to NRHP: March 22, 1984

The Roth Cigar Factory is a historic site in Sarasota, Florida located at 30 Mira Mar Court. The building operated as a cigar factory for Edward and Michael Roth from 1923 to 1938. On March 22, 1984, it was added to the U.S. National Register of Historic Places.

== History ==
Cigar making in Sarasota began in 1911 with the founding of Sarasota Cigar Company. By 1913, a second cigar company, Roth Cigar Factory, was established in the city. The company was owned and operated by two brothers: Edward and Michael Roth. The brothers began their cigar production at a factory and newsstand located at 220 Main Street.

In 1920, Edward Roth acquired land for a separate cigar factory. The building was constructed in 1922 and completed the following year—the same time as the nearby Mira Mar Apartments (DeMarcay Hotel) and Mira Mar Hotel, buildings that were all designed by Thomas Reed Martin. Cigars were produced at the factory and then sold at the main store nearby, located at 214 Main Street. The building was used until 1938 when it was vacated and the cigar company relocated to Pineapple Avenue nearby.

On March 22, 1984, it was added to the National Register of Historic Places.
