= United States Post Office–Federal Building (Sarasota, Florida) =

Historic building in Florida, United States

Federal Building
- Interactive map of the Federal Building area

General information
- Location: 111 South Orange Avenue, Sarasota, United States
- Coordinates: 27°20′09″N 82°32′19″W
- Completed: 1934

Design and construction
- Architects: George Albee Freeman; Louis A. Simon
- U.S. Post Office–Federal Building
- U.S. National Register of Historic Places
- Location within Florida Location within the United States
- MPS: Sarasota MRA
- NRHP reference No.: 84003847
- Added to NRHP: March 22, 1984

U.S. Post Office
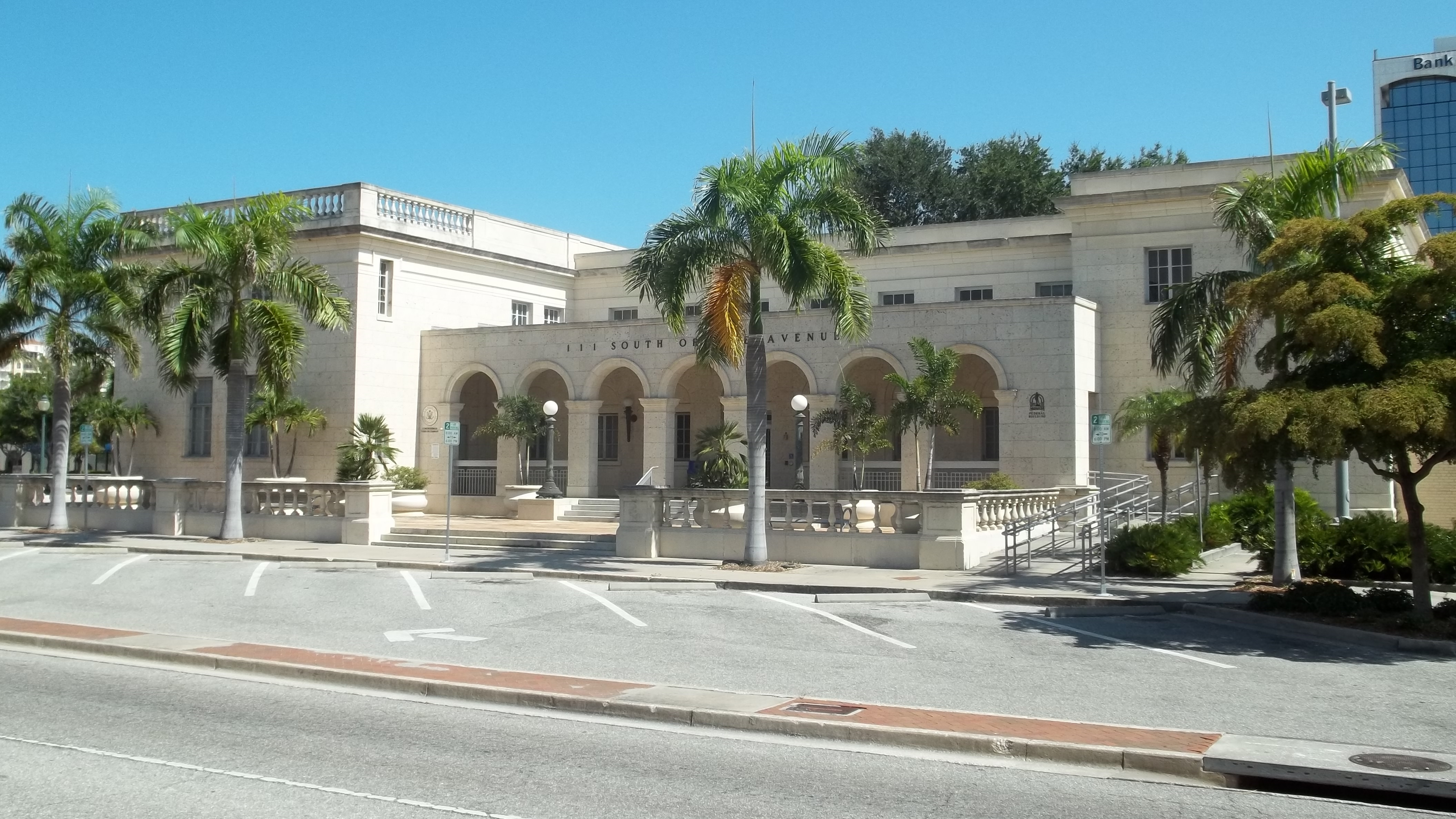
- Interactive map of the U.S. Post Office area

General information
- Architectural style: Classical Revival
- Location: 1611 Ringling Boulevard, Sarasota, United States

The U.S. Post Office–Federal Building (also known as the Social Security Building) is a historic site in Sarasota, Florida. The listing consists of two buildings: the Federal Building located at 111 South Orange Avenue and the U.S. Post Office building located at 1611 Ringling Boulevard. On March 22, 1984, these two buildings were added to the U.S. National Register of Historic Places as part of the Sarasota MRA (Multiple Resource Area).

== See also ==
- List of United States post offices
