= South Side School (Sarasota, Florida) =

- U.S. National Register of Historic Places
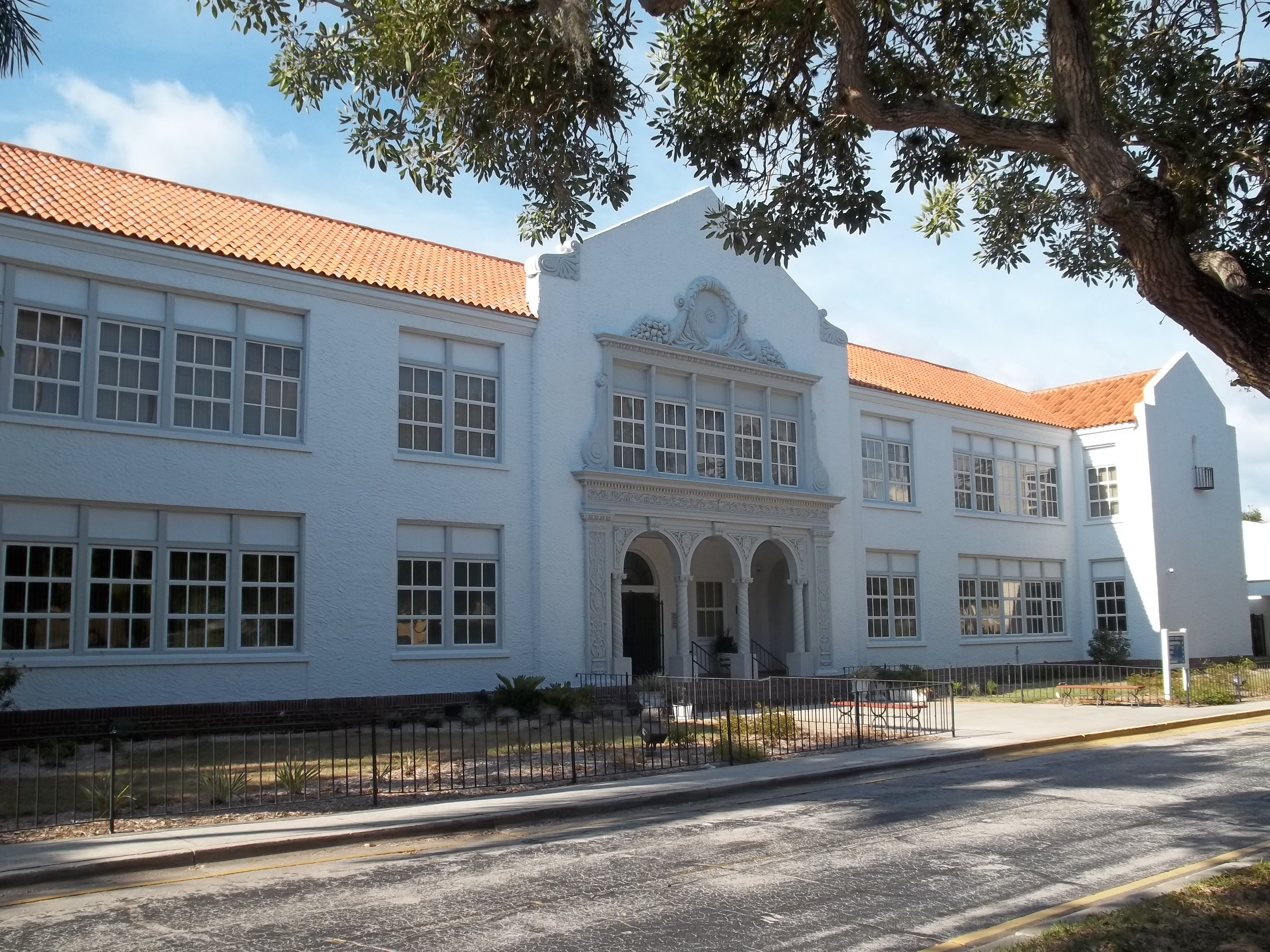

- Location within Florida Location within the United States
- Location: Sarasota, Florida
- Coordinates: 27°18′29″N 82°31′53″W
- Architect: M. Leo Elliot
- Architectural style: Mediterranean Revival
- MPS: Sarasota MRA
- NRHP reference No.: 84003846
- Added to NRHP: September 14, 1984

The South Side School, also known as Southside Elementary School, is a historic school in Sarasota, Florida. It is located at 1901 Webber Street. On September 14, 1984, it was added to the U.S. National Register of Historic Places.
