= Capt. W. F. Purdy House =

Historic house in Florida, United States

- U.S. National Register of Historic Places
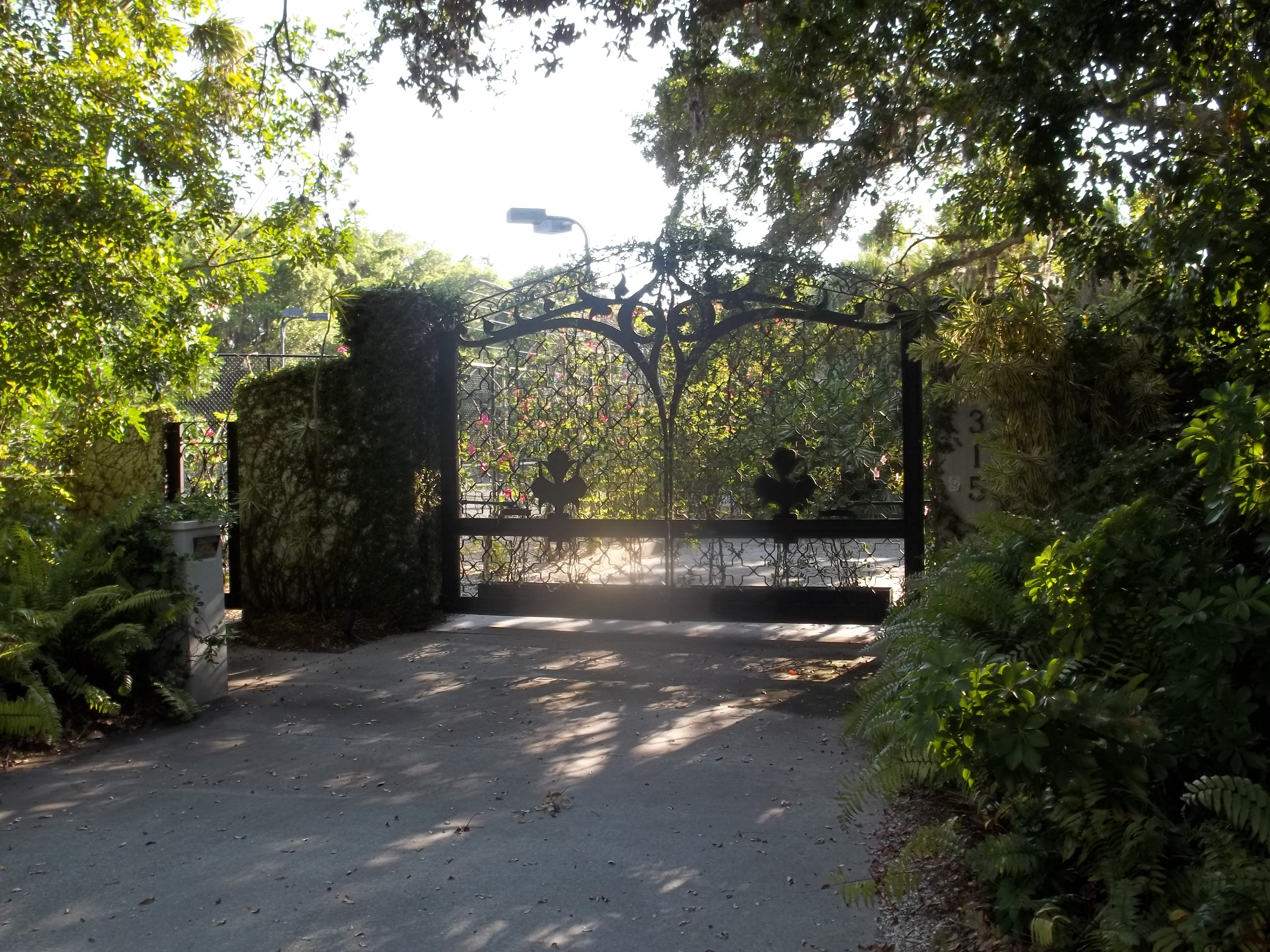
- Entry gate

- Location within Florida Location within the United States
- Location: Sarasota, Florida
- Coordinates: 27°21′52″N 82°33′24″W
- Architectural style: Bungalow/Craftsman
- MPS: Sarasota MRA
- NRHP reference No.: 84003840
- Added to NRHP: 22 March 1984

The Capt. W. F. Purdy House is a historic home in Sarasota, Florida. It is located at 3315 Bayshore Road. On March 22, 1984, it was added to the U.S. National Register of Historic Places.
