= Frances-Carlton Apartments =

- U.S. National Register of Historic Places
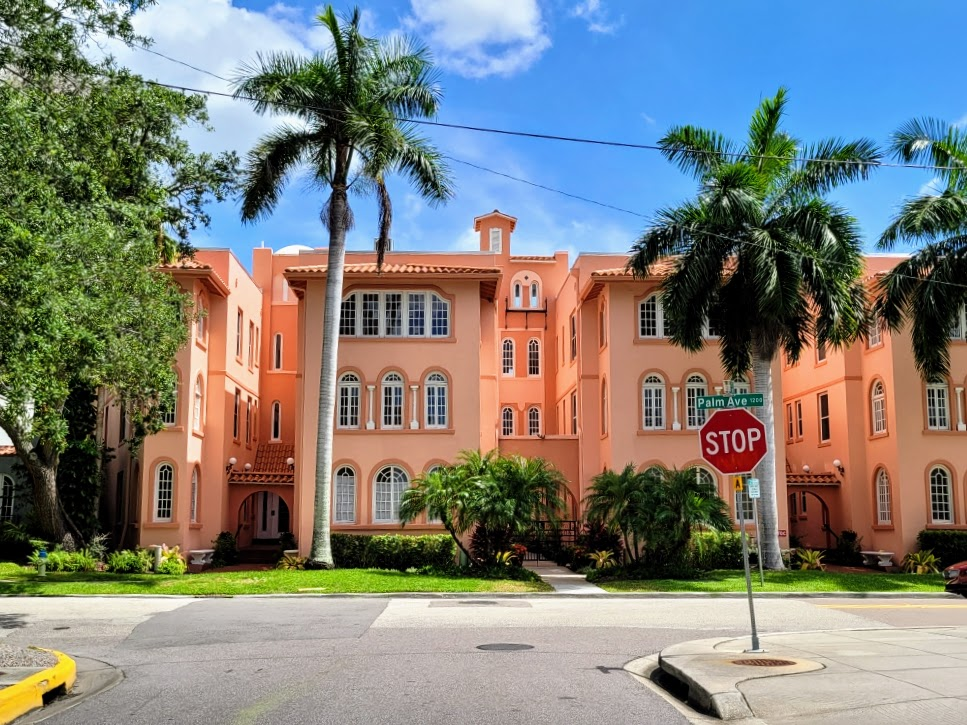
- Frances-Carlton Apartments in July 2022

- Location within Florida Location within the United States
- Location: Sarasota, Florida
- Coordinates: 27°20′11″N 82°32′46″W
- MPS: Sarasota MRA
- NRHP reference No.: 84003837
- Added to NRHP: March 22, 1984

The Frances-Carlton Apartments is a historic site in Sarasota, Florida. It is located at 1221-1227 North Palm Avenue. On March 22, 1984, it was added to the U.S. National Register of Historic Places.

== Gallery ==
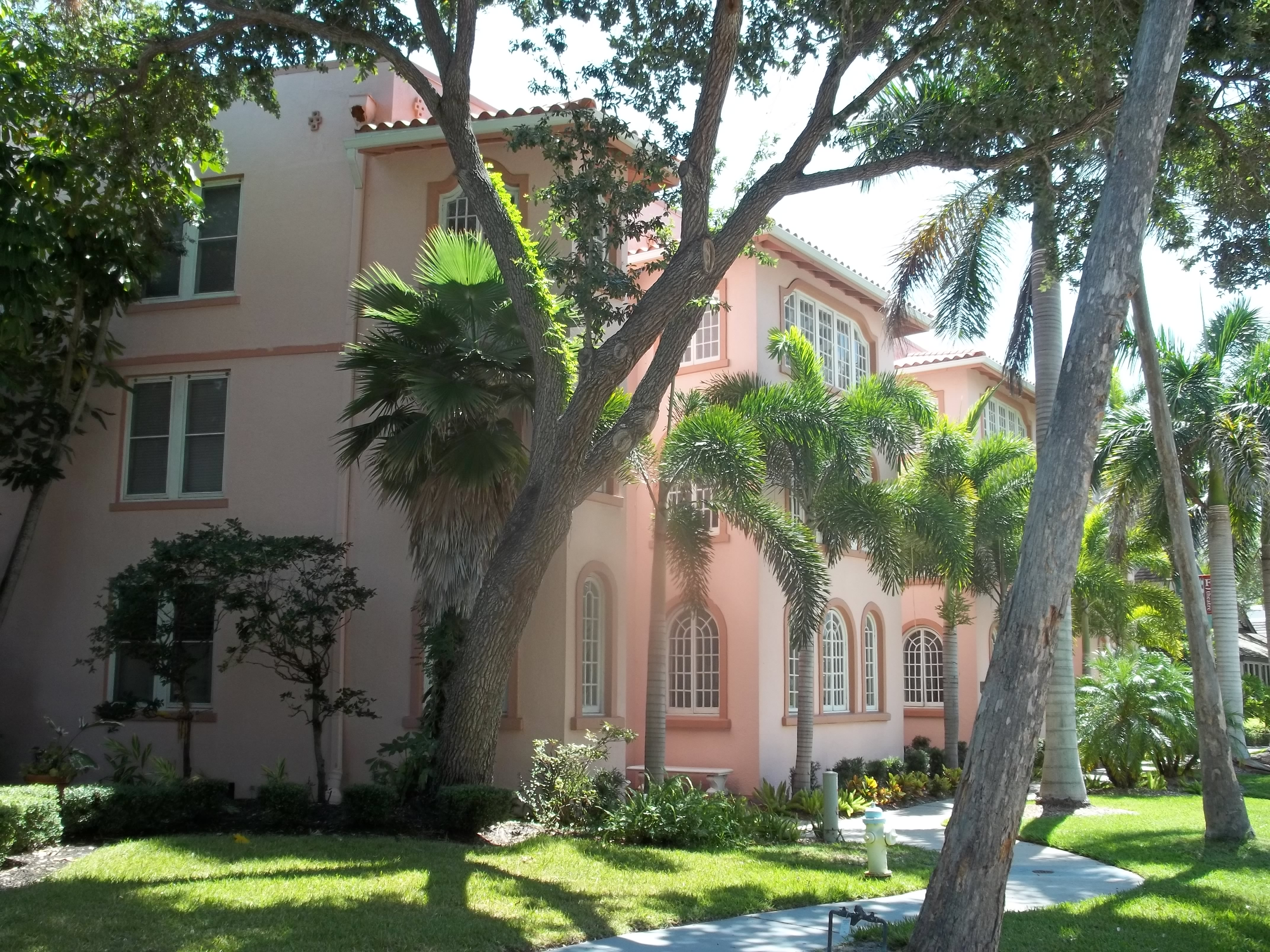
Frances-Carlton Apartments in 2011
