= L. D. Reagin House =

Historic house in Florida, United States

- L.D. Reagin House
- U.S. National Register of Historic Places
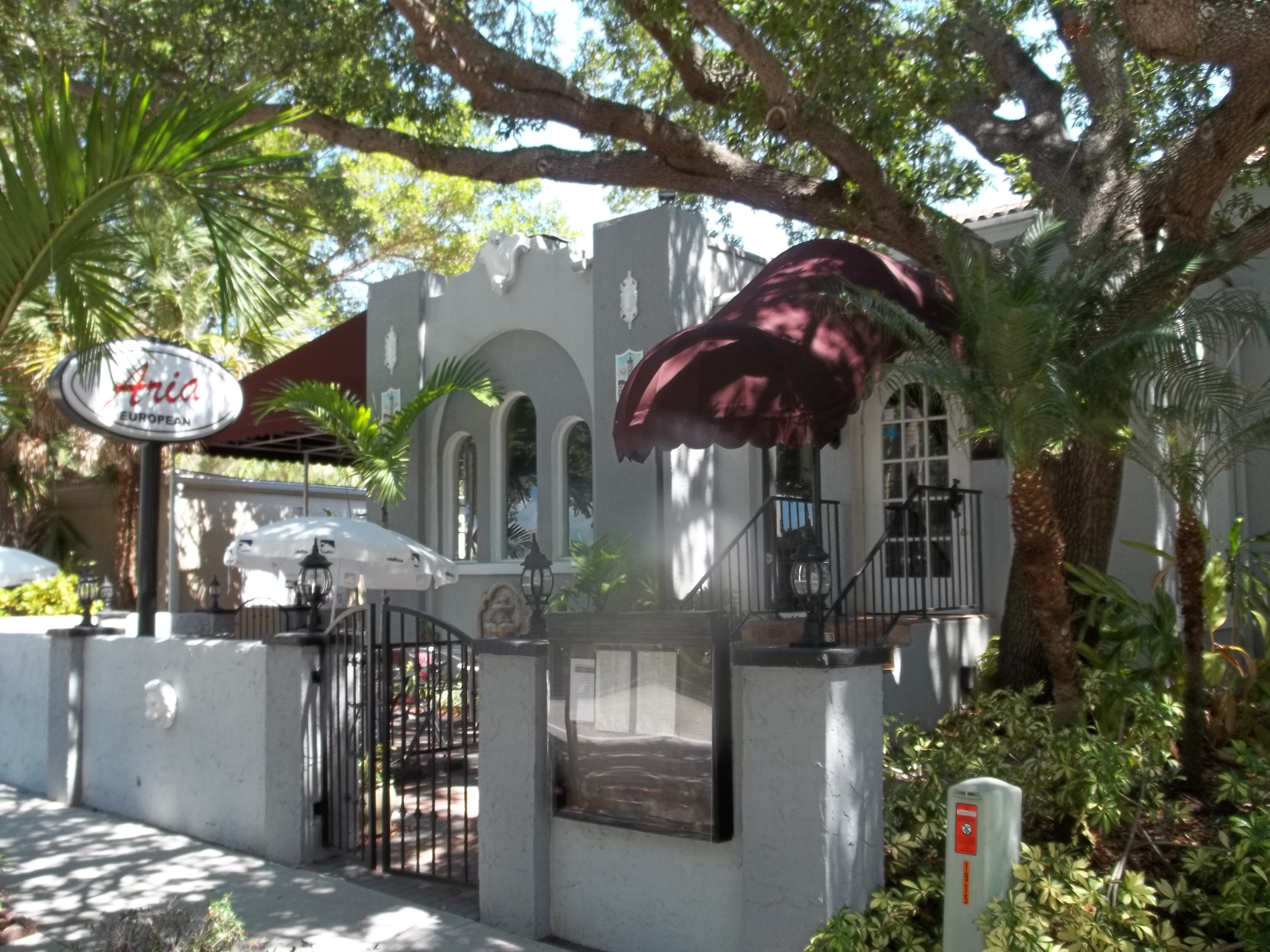

- Location within Florida Location within the United States
- Location: Sarasota, Florida
- Coordinates: 27°20′11″N 82°32′48″W
- Built: 1926
- Architect: Thomas Reed Martin
- Architectural style: Mediterranean Revival
- MPS: Sarasota MRA
- NRHP reference No.: 84000111
- Added to NRHP: October 25, 1984

The L.D. Reagin House is a historic house in Sarasota, Florida. It is located at 1213 North Palm Avenue. On October 25, 1984, it was added to the U.S. National Register of Historic Places. It was built by prominent local architect, Thomas Reed Martin.
