= Burns Realty Company–Karl Bickel House =

Historic house in Florida, United States

- U.S. National Register of Historic Places
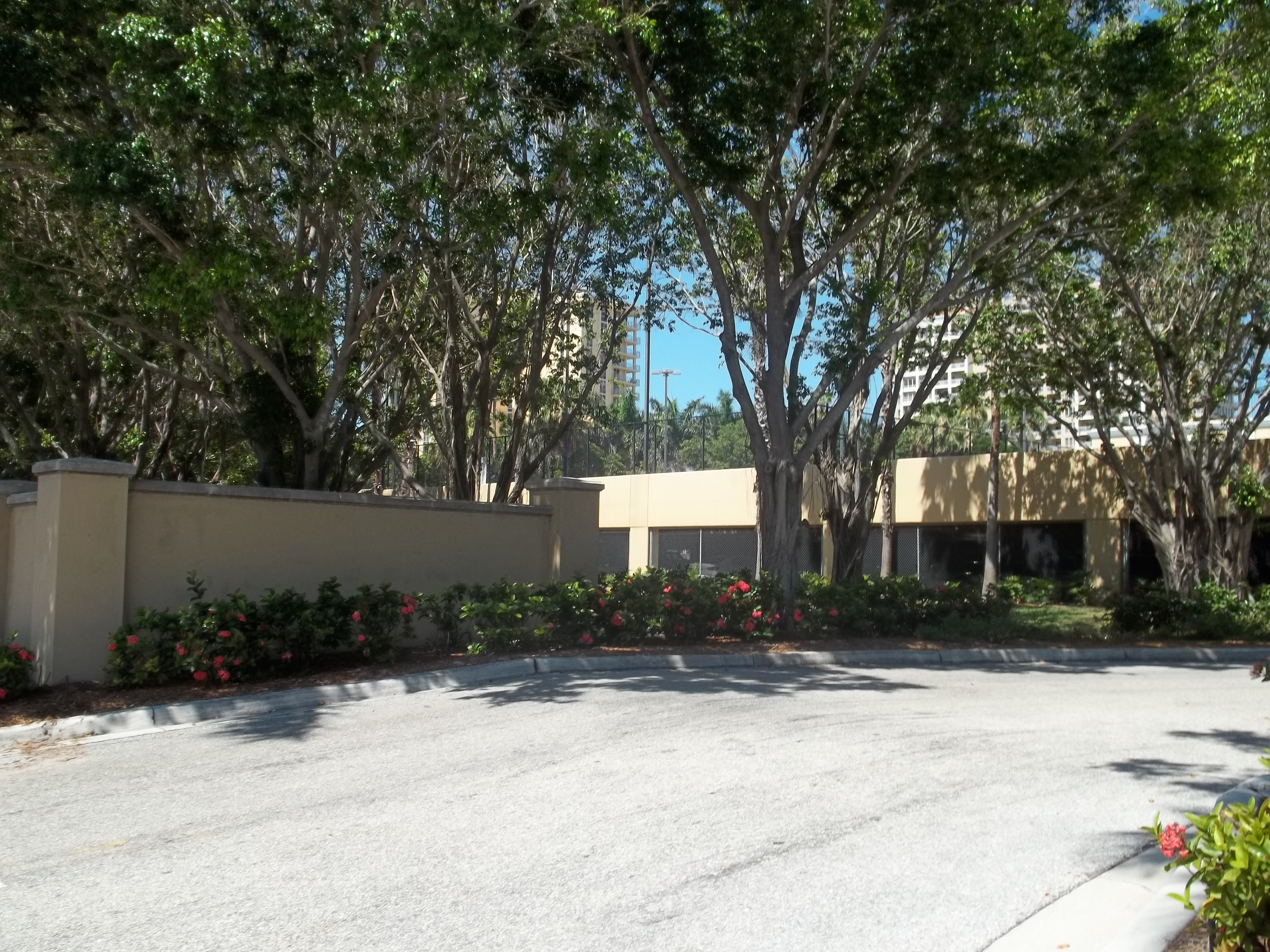
- Original site of building, now demolished

- Location within Florida Location within the United States
- Location: Sarasota, Florida
- Coordinates: 27°20′13″N 82°32′50″W
- Architect: Dwight James Baum
- MPS: Sarasota MRA
- NRHP reference No.: 87000196
- Added to NRHP: March 5, 1987

The Burns Realty Company–Karl Bickel House was a historic home in Sarasota, Florida. It was located at 101 North Tamiami Trail. On March 5, 1987, it was added to the U.S. National Register of Historic Places. The building was razed in 2000 to make room for the Sarasota Ritz-Carlton.
