= S. H. Kress and Co. Building (Sarasota, Florida) =

S.H. Kress and Co. Building
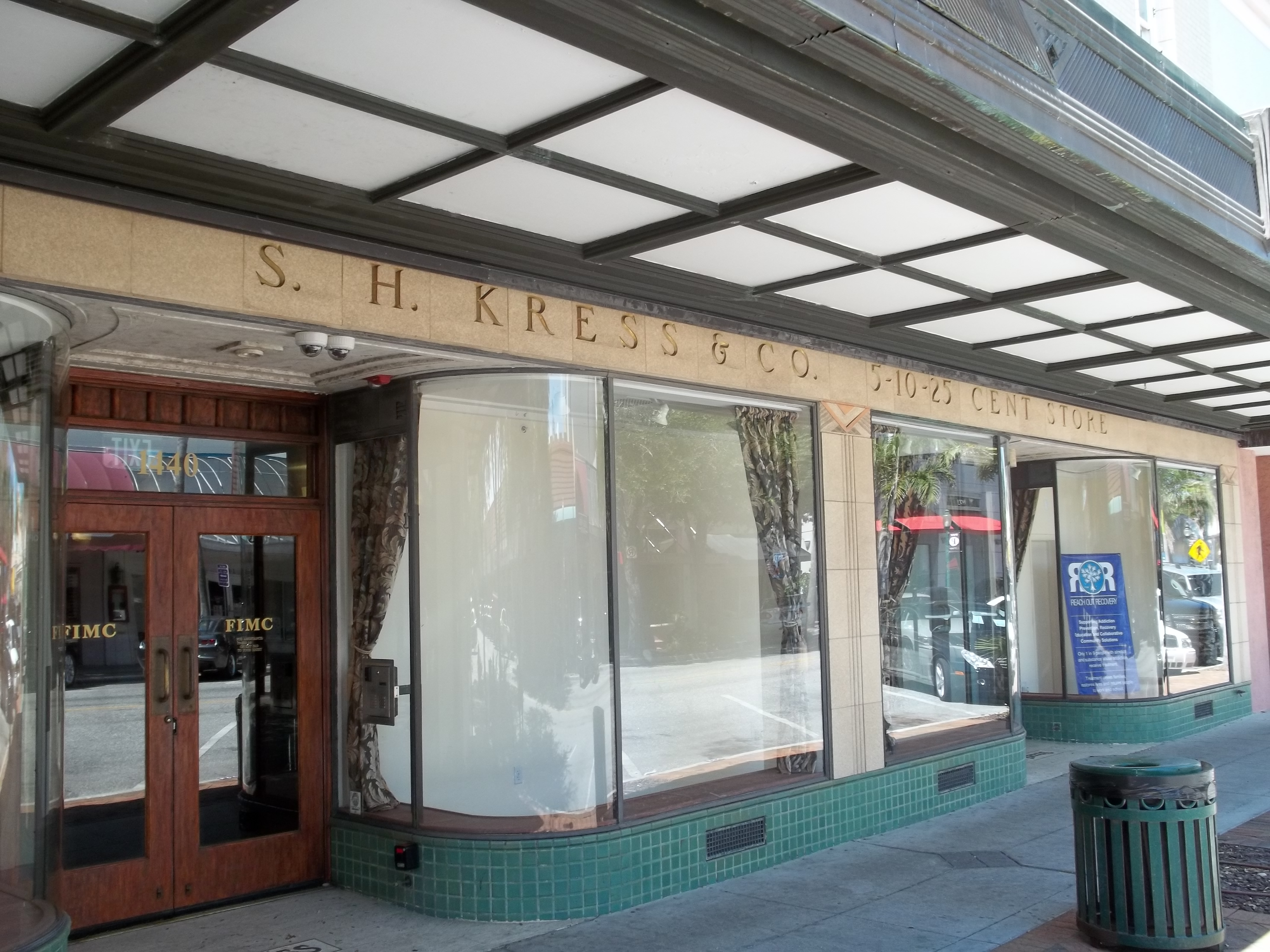
- Front of the building in 2011.
- Interactive map of the S.H. Kress and Co. Building area

General information
- Location: 1442 Main Street, United States
- Coordinates: 27°20′9″N 82°32′31″W
- Opened: November 30, 1932

Technical details
- Floor count: 4

Design and construction
- Main contractor: G.A. Miller
- S.H. Kress and Co. Building
- U.S. National Register of Historic Places
- MPS: Sarasota MRA
- NRHP reference No.: 84003839
- Added to NRHP: March 22, 1984

The S. H. Kress and Co. Building at 1442 Main Street in Sarasota, Florida, United States is a historic department store building. It was part of the S. H. Kress & Co. "five and dime" department store chain. On March 22, 1984, it was added to the U.S. National Register of Historic Places.

== Gallery ==
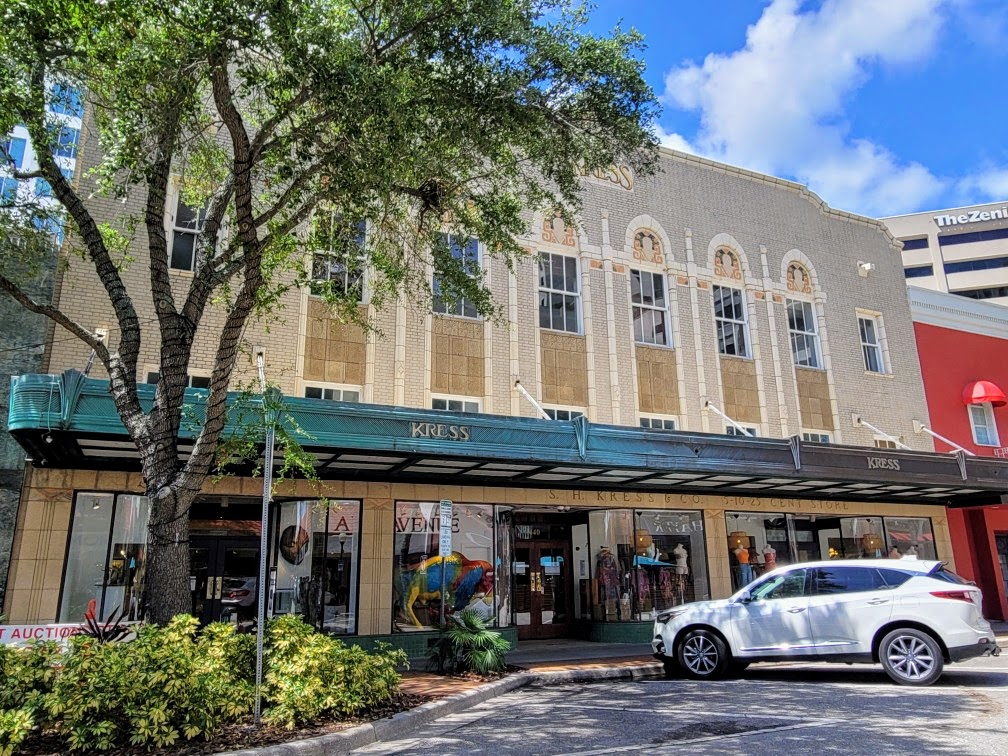
S.H. Kress Building in July 2022

== See also ==
- National Register of Historic Places listings in Florida
