= DeMarcay Hotel =

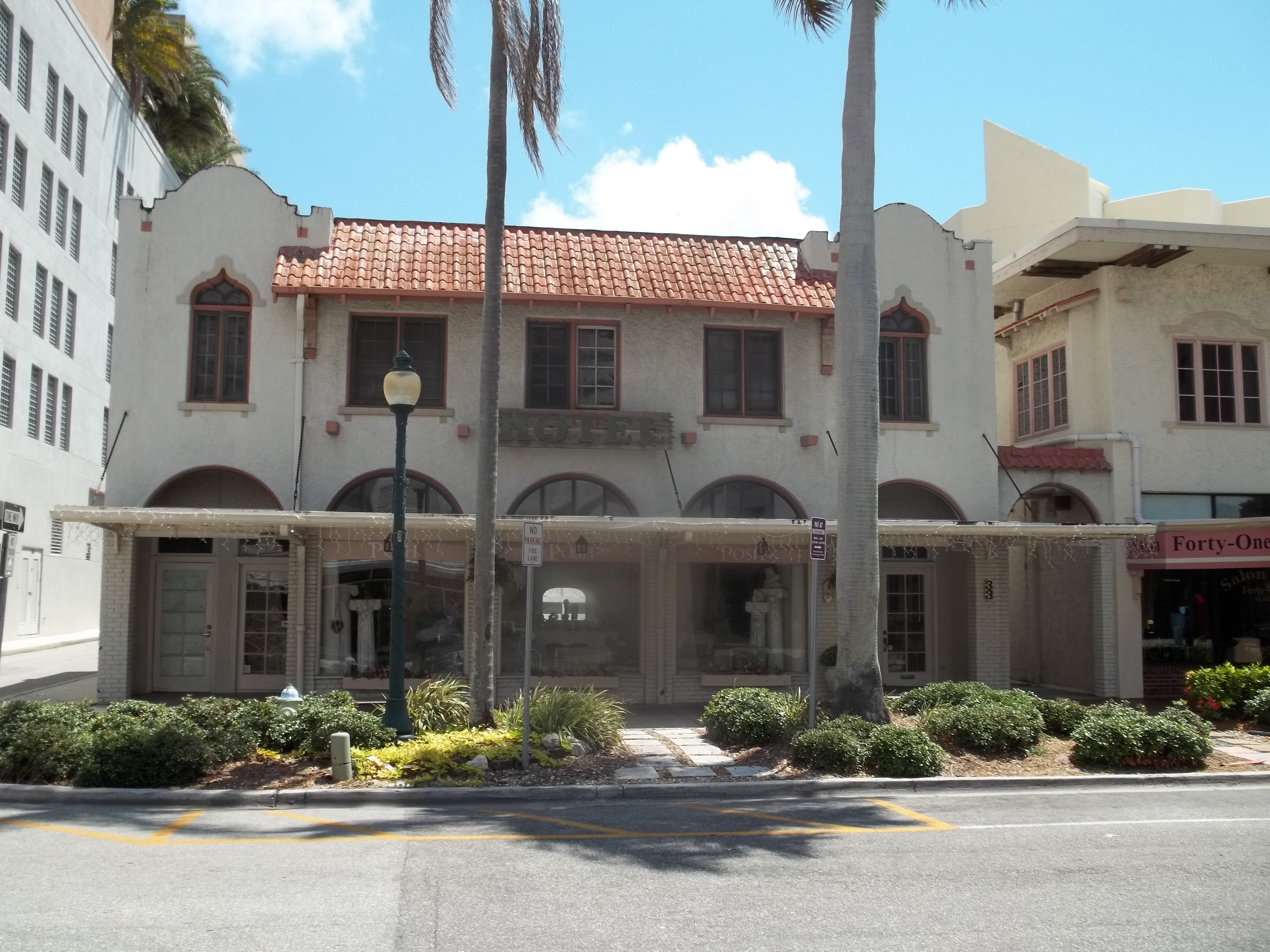
- Front of the Demarcay Hotel

General information
- Architectural style: Mission/Spanish Revival
- Location: 27 South Palm Avenue, Sarasota, Florida, United States
- Coordinates: 27°20′07″N 82°32′35″W
- Groundbreaking: October 5, 1922
- Opened: 1924

Design and construction
- Main contractor: W.R. Carman
- DeMarcay Hotel
- U.S. National Register of Historic Places
- Location within Florida Location within the United States
- NRHP reference No.: 84003834
- Added to NRHP: March 22, 1984

The DeMarcay Hotel is a historic hotel in Sarasota, Florida at 27 South Palm Avenue. The two-story hotel has a rectangular-plan, and was designed in Mission Style architecture. On March 22, 1984, it was added to the U.S. National Register of Historic Places.
