= Sarasota County Library System =

Public library system in Florida

Coordinates: 26.9629°N 82.3552°W

- Location: Sarasota County, Florida, United States
- Established: 1907
- Branches: 10

Other information
- Budget: $15.2 million (FY 2020)
- Director: Renee Di Pilato
- Employees: 158.5 FTE
- Website: sarasotacountylibraries.com
- References: FY 2020 Adopted Budget

The Sarasota County Library System is the public library system that serves Sarasota County in the U.S. state of Florida. It consists of ten locations, with a central library located in the city of Sarasota.

== History ==
The Sarasota Town Improvement Society established its first library in 1907. Over the years the system increased in size, and today there are ten library branches associated with Sarasota County Public Library System.

Every library provides patrons with adult, teen, and children's materials, along with computers for public use and Wi-Fi access. Sarasota County residents have access to Book-By-Mail, a convenient and free service to send library materials through the U.S. Postal Service to people who are unable to access the library collection due to temporary or long-term physical or visual disability, and Pinellas Talking Book Library. Through the latter, "residents of all ages who are unable to read standard print material due to visual, physical, or learning disabilities are provided recorded, Braille, and large-print books and magazines as well as a collection of descriptive videos and Playaways."

Sarasota County library patrons also have access to interlibrary loans (ILL), which allows patrons to borrow books from other library systems in Florida when the Sarasota County libraries do not own the material. They participate in the Florida Library Information Network (FLIN) to borrow materials from other participating Florida libraries through the SHAREit service. Sarasota County residents with a library card in good standing can request interlibrary loans. Individuals who purchase a visitor card (aka "non-resident card") will also have access to ILL if their cards are in good standing. Library accounts must have fines below $10 and need to be renewed every two years, either in person at any branch location or over the phone.

The Sarasota County Library System has a range of materials chosen based on the Collection Development Policy. These materials are selected by librarians using professional review sources. The system also takes recommendations from patrons.

In addition to digital resources, Sarasota County Libraries also has Pop-Up Library Services that make scheduled stops (also available by request), to "public parks, childcare facilities, condominium complexes, retirement communities, senior centers, recreational facilities and more." Services include tech assistance, borrowing materials, returning materials, and other inquiries.

The mission statement of the Sarasota County Libraries is "to offer equal access to information, foster lifelong learning and inspire community engagement."

In 2012, Sarasota was named "Florida Library of the Year" by the Florida Library Association.

A 11th library is planned for Longboat Key.

== Branches ==
=== Elsie Quirk Library ===
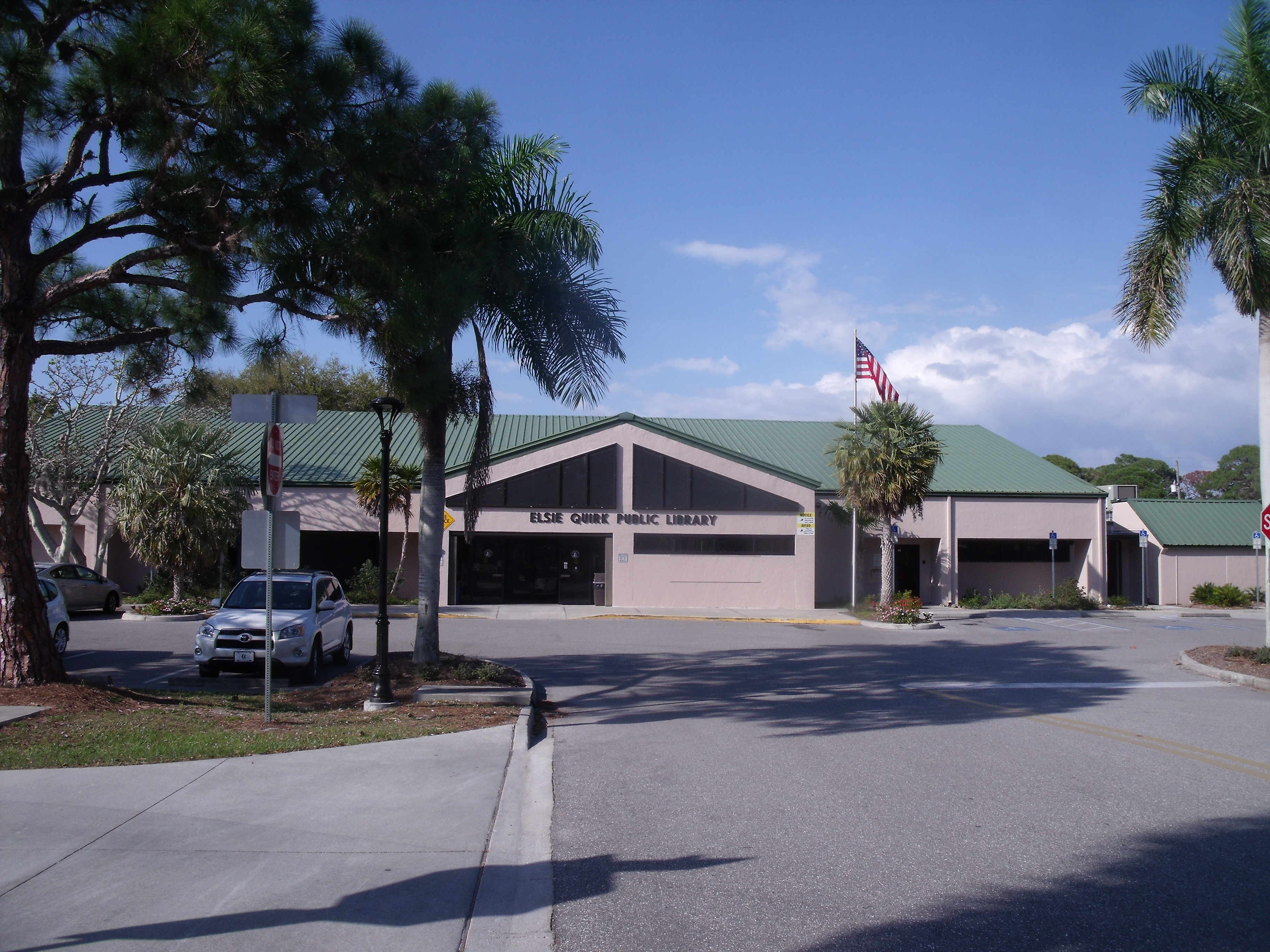
Elsie Quirk Library

The Elsie Quirk Library was established on June 15, 1962. The 1,400 square feet (130 m^{2}) library was established by Elsie Quirk after she visited a small community library while on vacation in North Carolina in 1961. When Quirk returned from vacation, she donated land at 101 Cocoanut Avenue in Englewood, along with $10,000. In 1961 the Friends of the Library was established headed by Leah Lasbury, Josephine Cortes and President Lois Potter. This library is the oldest in the library system of Sarasota county. Elsie Quirk's first librarian was Harriet Ives, a graduate of the University of Syracuse, with a master's degree in Library Science, with a salary of $1 an hour. The library currently houses a selection on genealogy.

The Friends of the Library was established in 1961, headed by Leah Lasbury, Josephine Cortez and President Lois Potter. The Lemon Bay Women's Club donated 3600 books to the Elsie Quirk Library. It was staffed by many volunteers, including Quirk herself.

This library became a major part of the Englewood Community. In 2001 it was upgraded, and has become the Elsie Quirk Public Library.

=== Frances T. Bourne Jacaranda Library ===
The Jacaranda Library was established on January 25, 1994, in Venice. In 1995, it changed its name to the Frances T. Bourne Jacaranda Library, dedicated to the former archivist in the U.S. State Department who helped raise funds to create the library.

In 2004, the library received an addition to the building that doubled its size. The architect who designed the addition aimed to incorporate the natural world with the building by emphasizing the buildings natural surroundings (the campus features a pond filled with lilies and is adjacent to a walking trail). The interior walls also feature many murals and paintings that reflect the Florida environment.

=== Fruitville Library ===
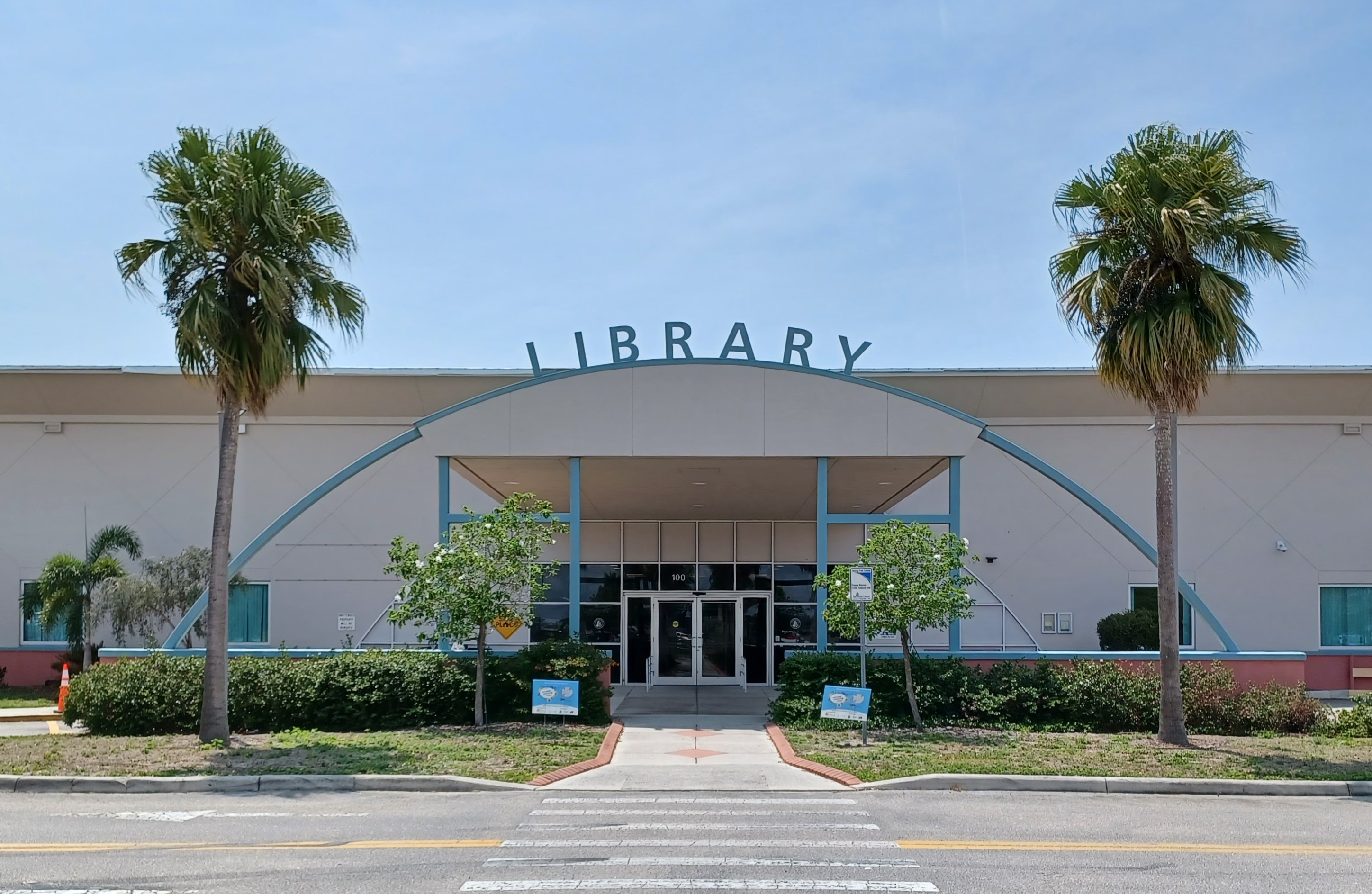
Fruitville Public Library

The Fruitville Library was established in 2001 and serves Sarasota County and Lakewood Ranch residents. The Fruitville Library provides print and digital collections, public computers, free Wi-Fi, study spaces, meeting rooms, and a broad mix of educational and cultural programs. Services include teen activities, adult learning programs, technology assistance, children’s educational opportunities, and community events such as gardening workshops and literacy initiatives. The library is supported by the Friends of the Fruitville Library. The Friends of the Fruitville Library is a nonprofit volunteer organization that supports the branch through fundraising, advocacy, and programming assistance. The group operates the on-site bookstore, provides supplemental funding for children’s teen, and adult programs, and contributes to enhancements such as furnishings, technology and special events.

In November 2025, Sarasota County announced that the Fruitville Library will close on December 18, 2025, to undergo a major renovation. The project will transform the library into a modern, multi-use facility for all ages. It will feature a “Creation Station” makerspace, a renovated children’s area, a dedicated teen room, new collaboration and study rooms, expanded community-meeting spaces, and a green courtyard for outdoor reading and events. This project also includes the new Sarasota County History Center adjacent to the library.

=== Gulf Gate Library ===
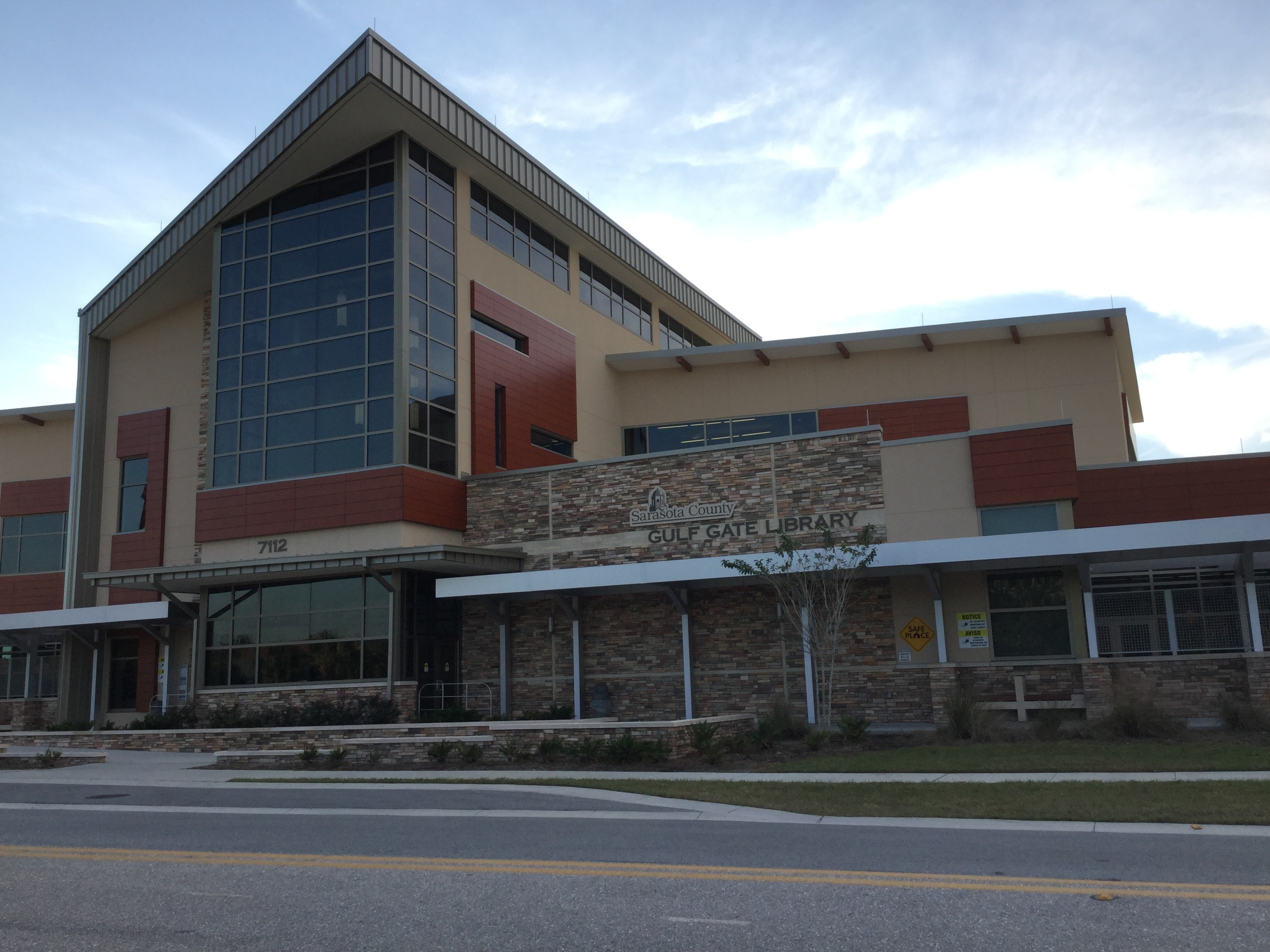
Gulf Gate Library

The Gulf Gate Library opened in 1977, originally located in a storefront on Gateway Avenue. On December 5, 1983, the library opened its doors.

After much wear and tear over the years, the Friends of the Gulf Gate Library raised funds to build a new library. The library shut down in 2013 and temporarily relocated for two years to the Sarasota Square Mall.

The new library re-opened to the public on January 24, 2015, at its original location. Upon its re-opening, the library received Reader's Digest's "Most Impressive" award for the state of Florida in their "The Most Impressive Library in Every State" article. In 2016, the library was nominated as "the most beautiful library in Florida" by Tech Insider.

=== North Port Library ===
In 1975, funds were raised to purchase a two-bedroom house was purchased on Tamiami Trail, which was enlarged to serve as a library. It was a free library, staffed only by volunteers, and operating with 5,000 donated books. In 1992, the library outgrew the house and a new library building was built. The library now has a used book store.

=== Pop-Up Library ===
The Pop-Up Library is a mobile outreach service operated by Sarasota County Libraries and Historical Resources in Sarasota County, Florida. The service uses a fully staffed vehicle to provide library cards, circulation services, books, digital resources, Wi-Fi access, and technology assistance to communities with limited access to a traditional library branch.

Launched in 2023 with support from the Library Foundation for Sarasota County and the William G. & Marie Selby Foundation, the Pop-Up Library was created to reduce transportation, scheduling, and geographic barriers to library use. The vehicle makes scheduled stops at childcare centers, retirement communities, senior centers, parks, and recreation facilities. Community partners may also request a visit.

In its first year of operation, the Pop-Up Library completed approximately 150 stops throughout the county, serving residents who previously had limited access to library services. The Pop-Up Library also supports early literacy, digital access, and community engagement by offering storytimes, showcasing new materials, and helping residents connect with online county resources.

=== Shannon Staub Library ===
The Shannon Staub Library opened on October 17, 2017. The 23,321-square-foot facility serves as both a public library and the library for the technical college. The namesake of the library, Shannon Staub, stays very active within the Sarasota County Public Library System as a retiree. Staub was a 14-year Sarasota County commissioner who represented North Port, Englewood, and Venice. She was a significant proponent for public libraries, becoming a founding chair of the Library Foundation of Sarasota County in 2012.

=== Betty J. Johnson North Sarasota Library ===
The North Sarasota Library once offered a program that allows patrons to check out a person, just like checking out a library book. Through this program, local community members sit and talk with patrons for 20 minutes. In 2019 the North Sarasota Library was renamed as the Betty J. Johnson North Sarasota Library in honor of a county employee who had worked for the library system for over four decades. Betty Johnson was an advocate for youth literacy and in 1979 had, along with the help of a not-for-profit library organization (the Friends of the Library), secured a grant of $10,000 to start a mobile library that eventually grew to become the North Sarasota Library in 2003.

=== Osprey Library at Historic Spanish Point ===
This small library is located inside the main building at Historic Spanish Point in Osprey, which also used to be the Osprey School. With an archaeological record that encompasses approximately 5,000 years of Florida prehistory, this National Register of Historic Places living history museum is referred to as one of the largest intact actively preserved archaeological sites of the prehistoric period on the Gulf Coast of Florida.

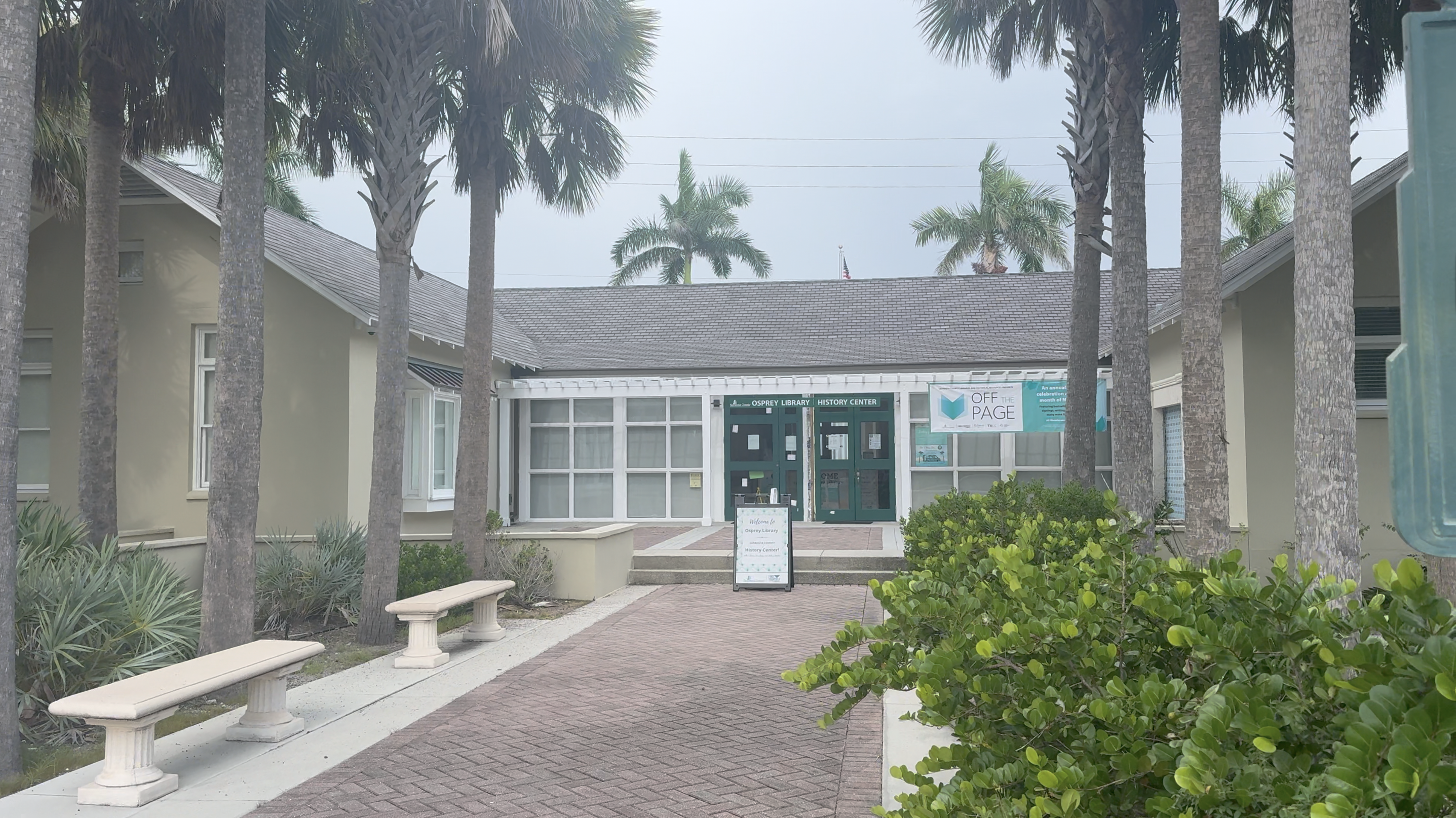
The front of Osprey Library in Osprey, Florida

=== Selby Library ===
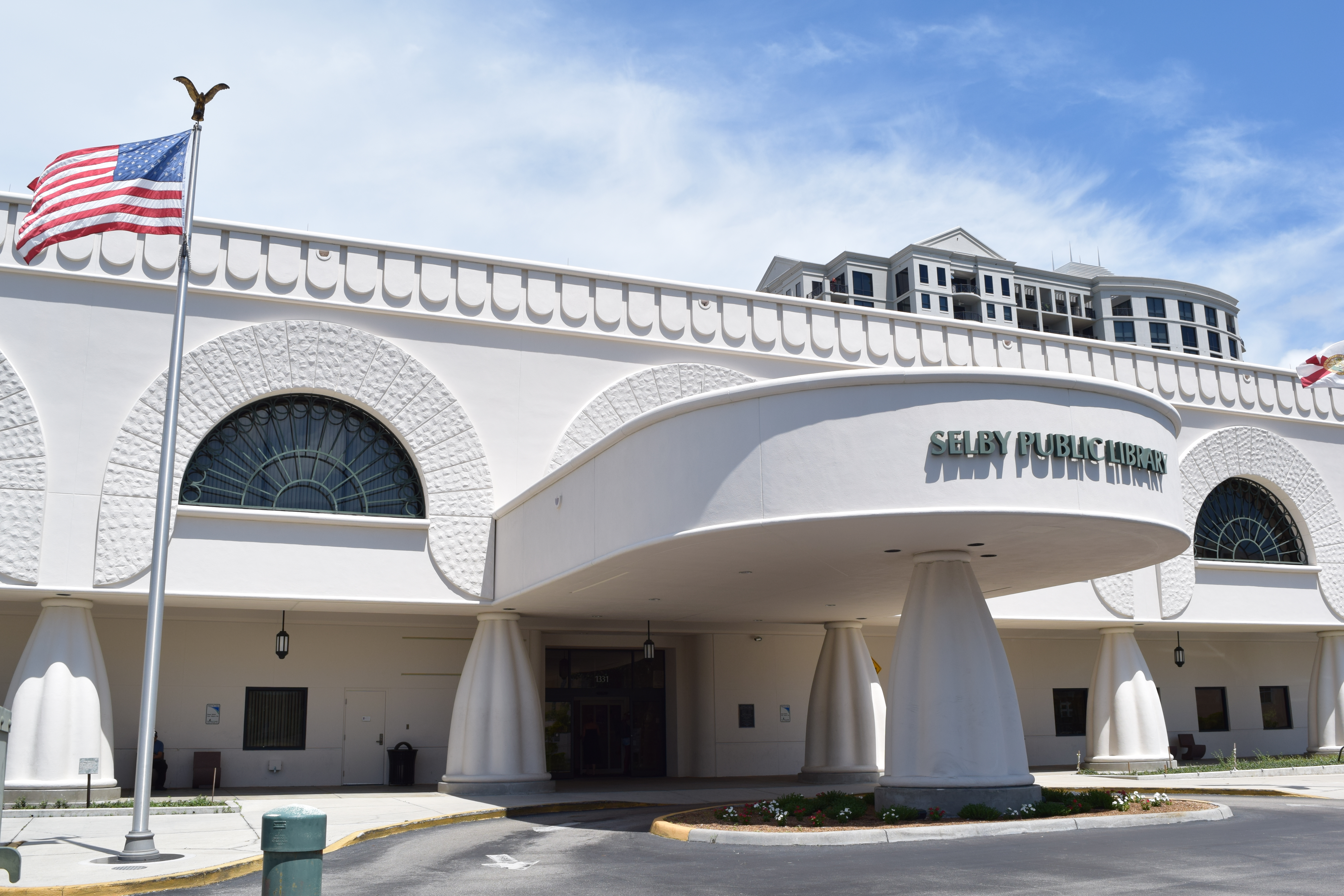
Selby Library

The Selby Library was established in 1907, as the first library built in Sarasota County. It remains the county's largest. Started in 1907 using a small donation from the Sarasota Town Improvement Society, it began as a single room housing books mostly donated by John Hamilton Gillespie, Sarasota's first mayor. It was located in the Stone Block Building on the southwest corner of Main Street and Pineapple Avenue.

In 1913, the Women's Club assumed operations. The library was moved to the club's headquarters, today the site of Florida Studio Theatre, where it remained from 1915 to 1931. The Sarasota County School Board then donated a wing of a school building on Main Street when more space was needed to accommodate the library's growing collections. In 1940, the city assumed control of the library, and one year later moved it to the Chidsey Library on Tamiami Trail.

In 1976, a new library was built on the bayfront and named the Selby Library in honor of the William G. and Marie Selby Foundation, whose donated funds made the new library possible. This permanent endowment was established by William Selby before his death in 1956.

The library moved from its bay front location to its new downtown location at Five Points Park in 1998, keeping its Selby name.

Selby library also has a partnership with the Sarasota Music Archive which houses an extensive music collection, archive sheet music, and a small store.

=== William H. Jervey Jr. Venice Library ===
The original Venice Library was built in 1965. In 2012, mold was discovered in one of the library's meeting rooms in which the county underwent efforts to clean the building. However, the problem persisted, and in 2014 mold returned to the meeting room. As a result, county officials closed down the meeting room as mold continued to spread throughout the library.

In spring 2017, the Venice Library was demolished and construction began in the fall for a new library. The William H. Jervey Jr. Venice Public Library opened on December 15, 2018. This new building is a 24,000 square feet (2,200 m^{2}) structure with 19,000 square feet (1,800 m^{2}) of usable space with the implementation of glass to allow for natural light.

The building is named after William H. Jervey Jr. who donated $1 million towards the project. He frequented the library often, and worked with Sweet Sparksman to construct the 19,428-square-foot building. He was initially critical of the closing of the original library. Jervey also donated $250,000 as an estate gift to the entire Sarasota Public Library System. The library invested in computers, charging stations, as well as a Creation Station that also makes 3D printing possible.
