= Bacheller-Brewer Model Home Estate =

Historic house in Florida, United States

- U.S. National Register of Historic Places
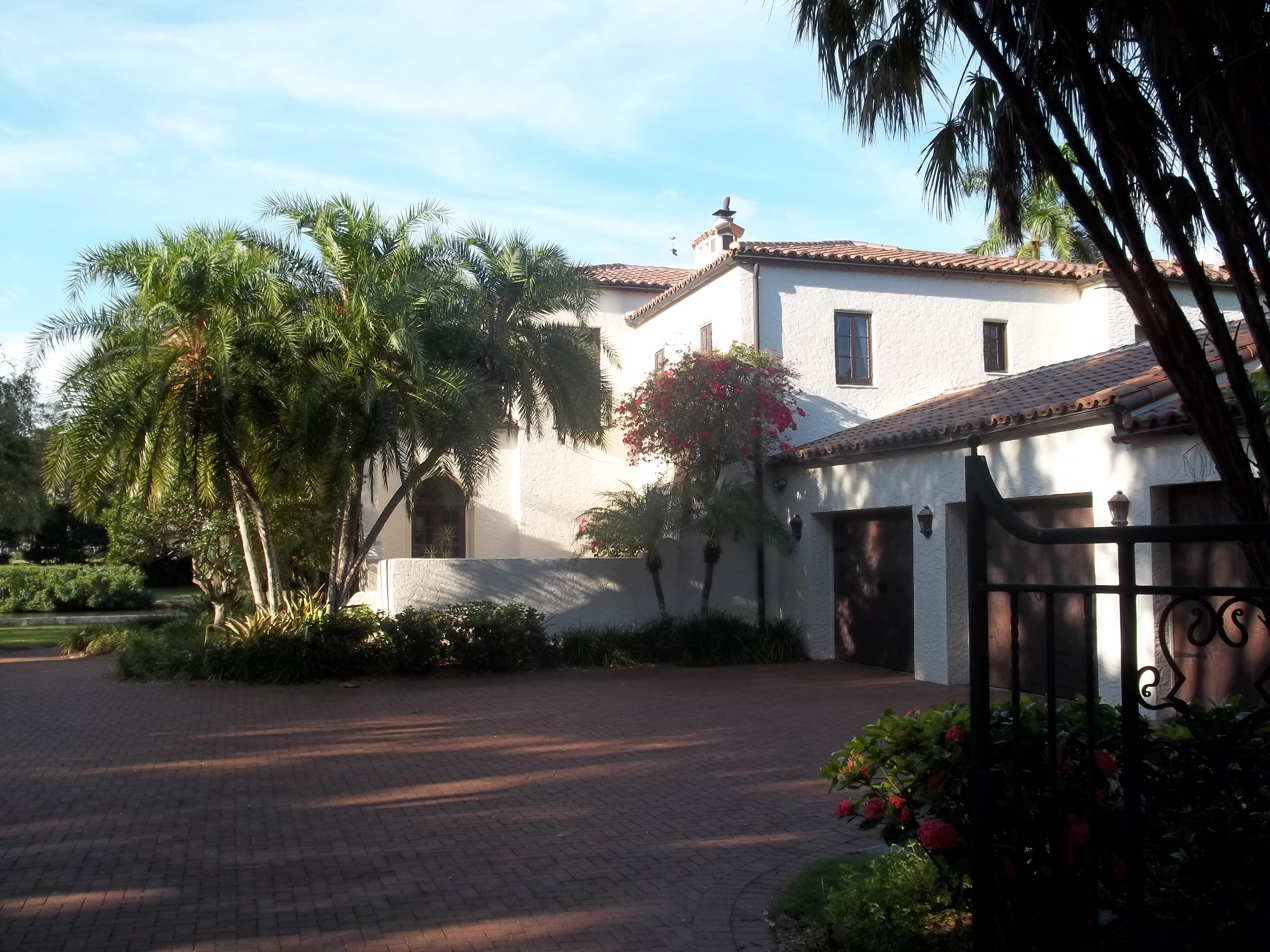

- Location within Florida Location within the United States
- Location: Sarasota, Florida
- Coordinates: 27°19′31″N 82°31′55″W
- NRHP reference No.: 91002034
- Added to NRHP: February 10, 1992

The Bacheller-Brewer Model Home Estate is a historic house located at 1903 Lincoln Drive in Sarasota, Florida. Designed in the Mediterranean Revival style by locally prominent architect Thomas Reed Martin in 1926. On February 10, 1992, it was added to the U.S. National Register of Historic Places.

== See also ==
- National Register of Historic Places listings in Sarasota County, Florida
