= Sarasota Municipal Auditorium =

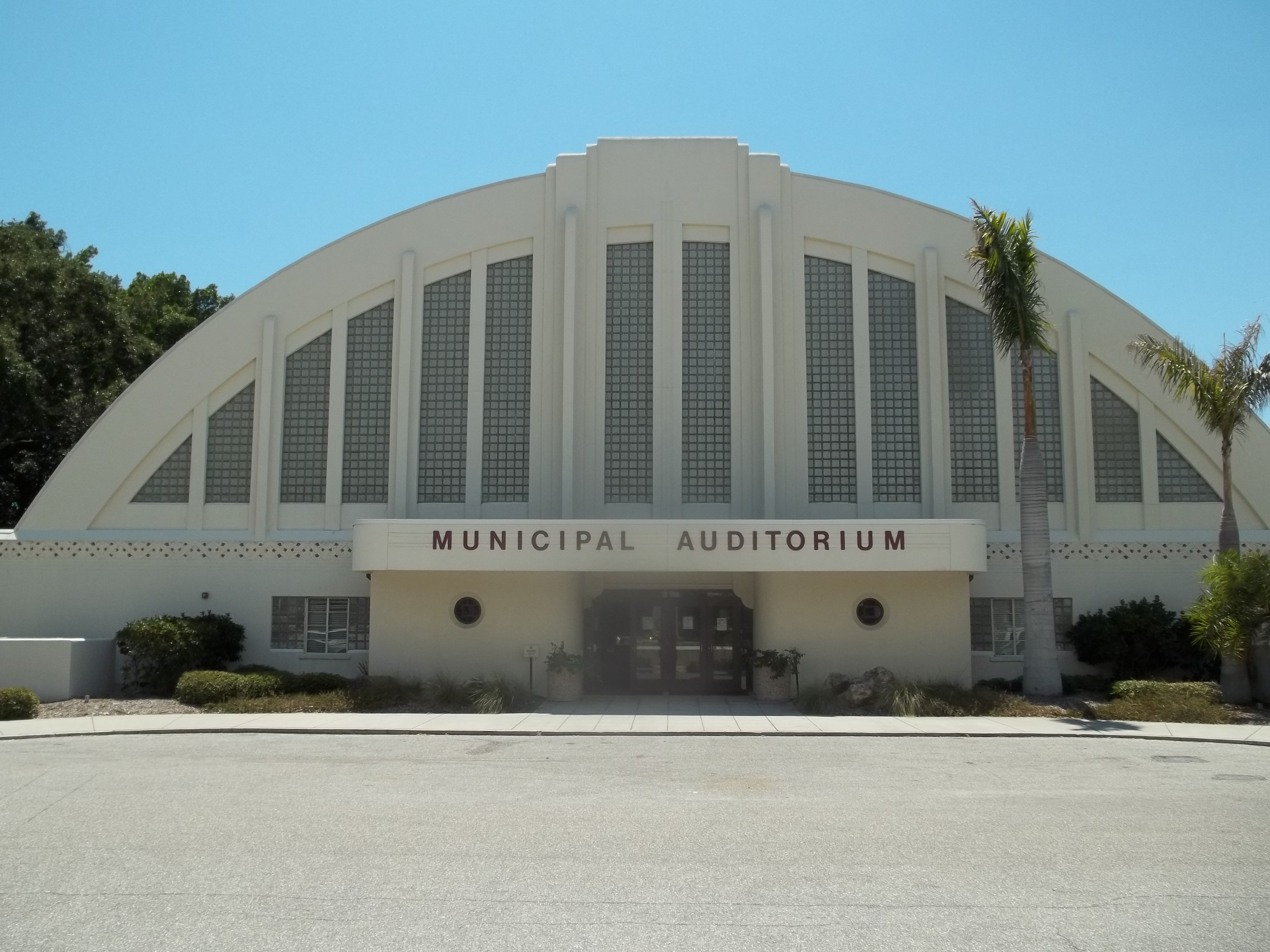
- Front of Municipal Auditorium
- Alternative names: Municipal Auditorium–Recreation Club; Sarasota Civic Center Exhibition Hall; Sarasota Exhibition Hall

General information
- Type: Municipal auditorium
- Architectural style: Art Deco and Moderne
- Location: 801 Tamiami Trail North, Sarasota, Florida, United States
- Coordinates: 27°20′35″N 82°32′52″W
- Construction started: July 1937
- Opened: February 24, 1938
- Renovated: 1997
- Cost: $131,000 ($2.24 million in 2024 dollars)
- Owner: Sarasota

Height
- Height: 39 ft (12 m)

Technical details
- Floor count: 2
- Floor area: 10,000 ft^{2} (930 m^{2})

Design and construction
- Architects: Clarence A. Martin; Thomas Reed Martin
- Engineer: Freeman H. Horton

Website
- srqauditorium.com
- Municipal Auditorium–Recreation Club
- U.S. National Register of Historic Places
- Location within Florida Location within the United States
- NRHP reference No.: 95000164
- Added to NRHP: February 24, 1995

The Sarasota Municipal Auditorium, listed in the National Register as Municipal Auditorium-Recreation Club, is a historic multi-purpose facility built-in 1938. It is located at 801 Tamiami Trail North and is owned/operated by the municipal government of Sarasota, Florida. The auditorium has 10,000 square feet (930 m^{2}) of exhibit space on its main floor and also contains an Art Deco style stage measuring 1,500 square feet (140 m^{2}).

The auditorium has been used for many community functions and recreational activities. It has also been known as the Sarasota Exhibition Hall and the Sarasota Civic Center Exhibition Hall. The auditorium is located on a large parcel of public land that is reserved for civic, the government uses. On February 24, 1995, the complex was added to the U.S. National Register of Historic Places.

== History ==
The concept of a Bayfront park and municipal auditorium for Sarasota was first conceived in 1935. The Municipal Auditorium/Recreation Club was constructed as part of an 11-acre (4.5 ha) recreational complex, originally called the Civic Center or Bayfront Park. In 1936, the municipal government obtained the 37-acre (15 ha) parcel from a private company that owed $15,000 in taxes on the site. Citizens, politicians, and city employees began the effort to secure a federal Work Projects Administration (WPA) grant for the center. In one instance, a group of prominent businessmen in Sarasota came together in March 1937 and agreed to loan the city $10,000 for the auditorium project. These businessmen included Benton W. Powell, publisher of the Sarasota Tribune and President of the Palmer National Bank; Samuel W. Gumpertz, senior vice president and general manager of Ringling Bros. and Barnum & Bailey Circus; J. J. Williams Jr., City Attorney; Ralph Caplets, a railroad and advertising executive; George Thacker, President of the Chamber of Commerce; Frank Logan, a building contractor who was serving as a fiscal agent of the City in connection with bond refunding; and George D. Lindsay, founder, owner, and editor of the Sarasota Herald.

The federal government granted the sum of $131,000, equivalent to $2.24 million in 2024, toward the project, and work began in July 1937. Skilled labor was paid for by the municipal general fund and common labor was paid for by the WPA. Several local business and civic leaders donated funds to the construction as well. At the time of its planning the Sarasota mayor, E. A. Smith announced plans to construct "one of the finest recreation centers in the South" on the public property.

The auditorium opened on February 24, 1938, hosting an annual Sara de Soto Celebration sponsored by the Sarasota Chapter of the Daughters of the American Revolution (DAR). Three thousand attended the celebration.

The building was designed in the Art Deco and Moderne styles by Chicago architects, Thomas Reed Martin and Clarence A. Martin who was the dean of the school of architecture at Cornell University. Clarence Augustine Martin had retired to Sarasota a decade earlier with his wife Gertrude Martin, the dean of women at Cornell. Freeman H. Horton was the engineer for the project and designed the truss system that supports the barrel-vaulted roof. Horton also collaborated with Thomas Reed Martin on recreational structures such as boathouses, pools, landscaping, and walkways. When the auditorium was constructed, the property had waterfront access to Sarasota Bay and boating was a significant activity from the recreation center. Later, dredge and fill extended the shoreline farther westward.

A second floor to the recreation club was added in 1940 at the western end of the auditorium. Ida and John Chidsey donated funding for the construction of the second-floor addition. The portion of the facility contained a lounge area, a recreation room, and a card room. The recreation center was dedicated in January 1940. North of the building, facilities for shuffleboard, lawn bowling, and tennis were built.

During World War II, the auditorium served as the Army and Navy Club and was the preferred venue for hosted dances, graduations, and concerts. The Florida West Coast Symphony (now the Sarasota Orchestra) performed in the facility from its inception in 1949 until the 1969 opening of the Van Wezel Performing Arts Hall which was constructed at the Bayfront of the same large public parcel.

== Description ==
The building has a barrel-vaulted roof. The structure contains an amount of glass block in its eastern elevation that provides natural lighting for the interior of the large building. Typically, the design of the auditorium is described as Moderne and Art Deco, but elements of the design also suggest the International Style that is associated with the Bauhaus.

It is a site that is used by more than 100,000 visitors a year as they attend banquets, charrettes for long-range planning, civic meetings, concerts, dances, events for teenagers, fundraising events, health lectures, homecoming events, political forums, proms, and galas, training seminars, and wedding receptions.

The venue also provides access to educational programs, entertainment, exhibits, recreation, and shows. Several days are booked most weeks for exhibits and shows that support antique sales, art exhibits, auctions, coin shows, conventions, flea markets, flower and gardening shows, gem and jewelry shows, seminars, and stamp collection and sales exhibits.

=== Hazzard Fountain ===
In 1940, an electrically-illuminated fountain was donated to the Municipal Auditorium by R.P. Hazzard. The fountain was designed by Frank Martin, whose father, Thomas, designed the auditorium. Louis Larsen built the Hazzard Fountain. The fountain was declared the "crown jewel" of the complex.

The Hazzard Fountain has been moved several times and placed in a variety of settings. Due to the widening of the Tamiami Trail, the fountain was removed from its original location, stored for years, and then placed at the entrance to the John and Mable Ringling Museum of Art during the late 1970s. After a few years, it was removed and placed in storage again. In 1995, the fountain was moved one last time back to its original location at the auditorium. The re-dedication of the fountain was held on January 6, 1996, at the Municipal Auditorium.

== Historical renovation ==
=== 1970s Renovation ===
The building was first renovated during the 1970s, and many of the historic features were hidden by more modern features designed by the Sarasota School architect, Jack West. The front façade and the glass blocks were covered and a cantilever marquee was added. In addition, a large canopy was installed to extend beyond the sidewalk in front of the building. Numerous changes to the interior were made that were later reversed in a restoration effort.

=== 1992-1997 Renovation ===
During the 1980s, a historic preservationist working for the city purchasing director Bob Gerkin, whose department oversaw the hall, pressed for the listing of the Municipal Auditorium on the national register. Gerkin was initially hesitant but was eventually won over, and even encouraged an effort to fund the restoration of the building to its original state.

Restoration work by local builders began in 1992 under the direction of local architects Gary B. Hoyt and Jeff Hole. The restoration focused on both the interior and exterior. The distinctive glass blocks were uncovered and reinforced with building techniques not in existence at the time of the original construction. The exterior was returned to its 1938 condition and by 1997, the renovation work was completed.

Funding for the initial restoration of the building was achieved through a combination of governmental efforts that included the state Bureau of Historic Preservation, the Historic Preservation Advisory Council, and the municipal government of Sarasota. Many volunteers donated work on the restoration planning, and many citizens attended planning sessions.

=== 2016-2018 Rehabilitation ===
By 2015, much of the building had once again fallen into disrepair. Cracks, water intrusion, and many critical structural issues had been overlooked in previous renovations from the 1970s and 1980s. On September 13, 2016, the State of Florida granted $500,000 to the City of Sarasota for historic preservation to extend the usage of the auditorium to future generations.

The architect Jonathan Parks AIA was hired to update and rehabilitate the Sarasota Municipal Auditorium including the Bayfront Community Center. Parks repaired and restored both the interior and exterior, emphasizing bringing the entire facility back to Thomas Reed Martin and Clarence A. Martin’s original intent. Restoration work on the front façade included repairing stucco cracks, repairing and re-pointing the glass block, repainting the building to match the original color, and waterproofing. Historically accurate hurricane-rated windows on the second floor of the Bayfront Community Center were reproduced to mimic the original. Entrances throughout the facility were reimagined to be more universally accessible, adding ramps, stainless steel railings, and doorways with easier egress. Roofing was replaced. Karl Hees of the structural engineering firm Hees & Associates Inc. aided in addressing the critical structural issues. The rehabilitation was completed in 2018.

In 2021, Parks’ historic rehabilitation was awarded the AIA Florida Merit Award for Historic Preservation and Restoration.

== Gallery ==
Photograph of auditorium

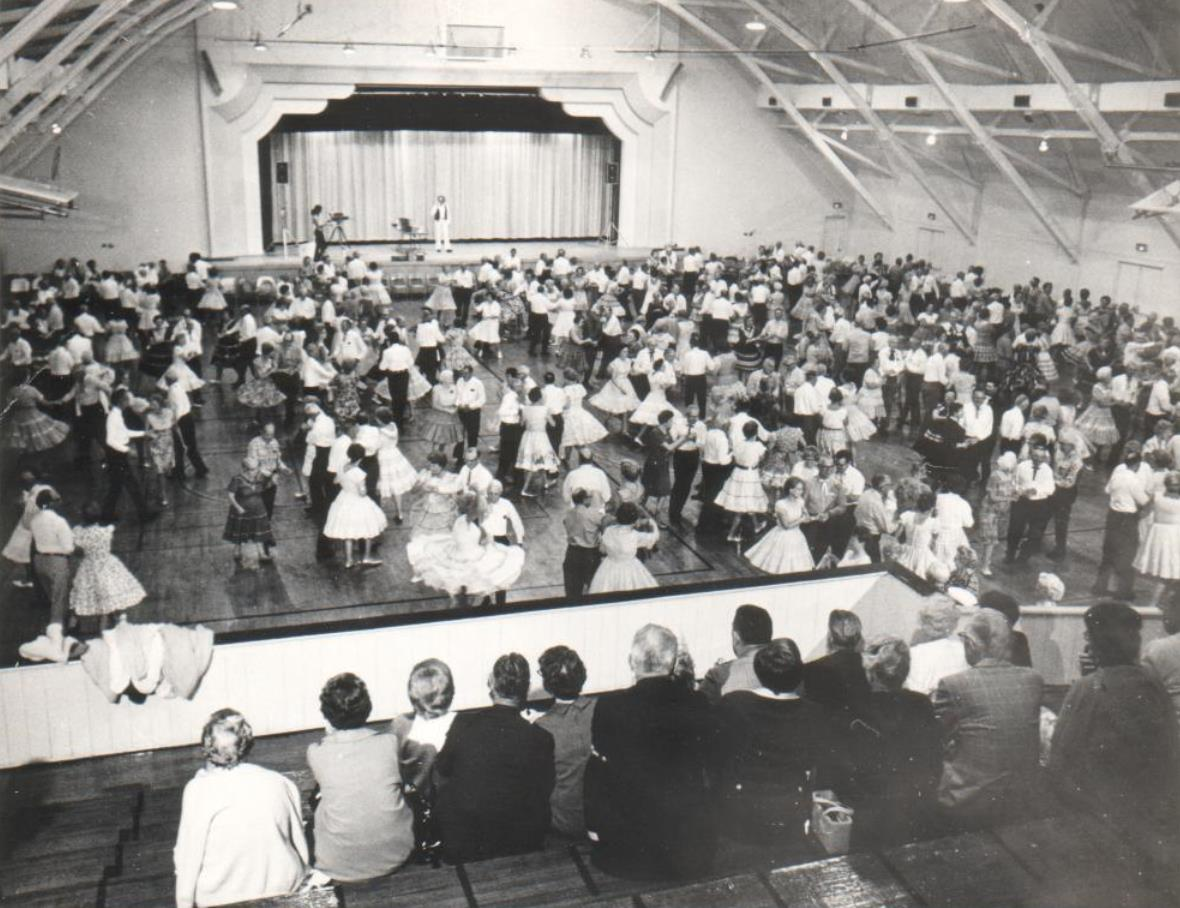
Interior of auditorium rented for a 1950s square dance

Interior, set for a gala, hosted by a community organization

Drawing of the Sarasota Municipal Auditorium by Richard Capes

Western entrance to the hall through the Recreation Club portion of the auditorium

An art show at the auditorium
