= Lemon Bay Woman's Club =

- U.S. National Register of Historic Places
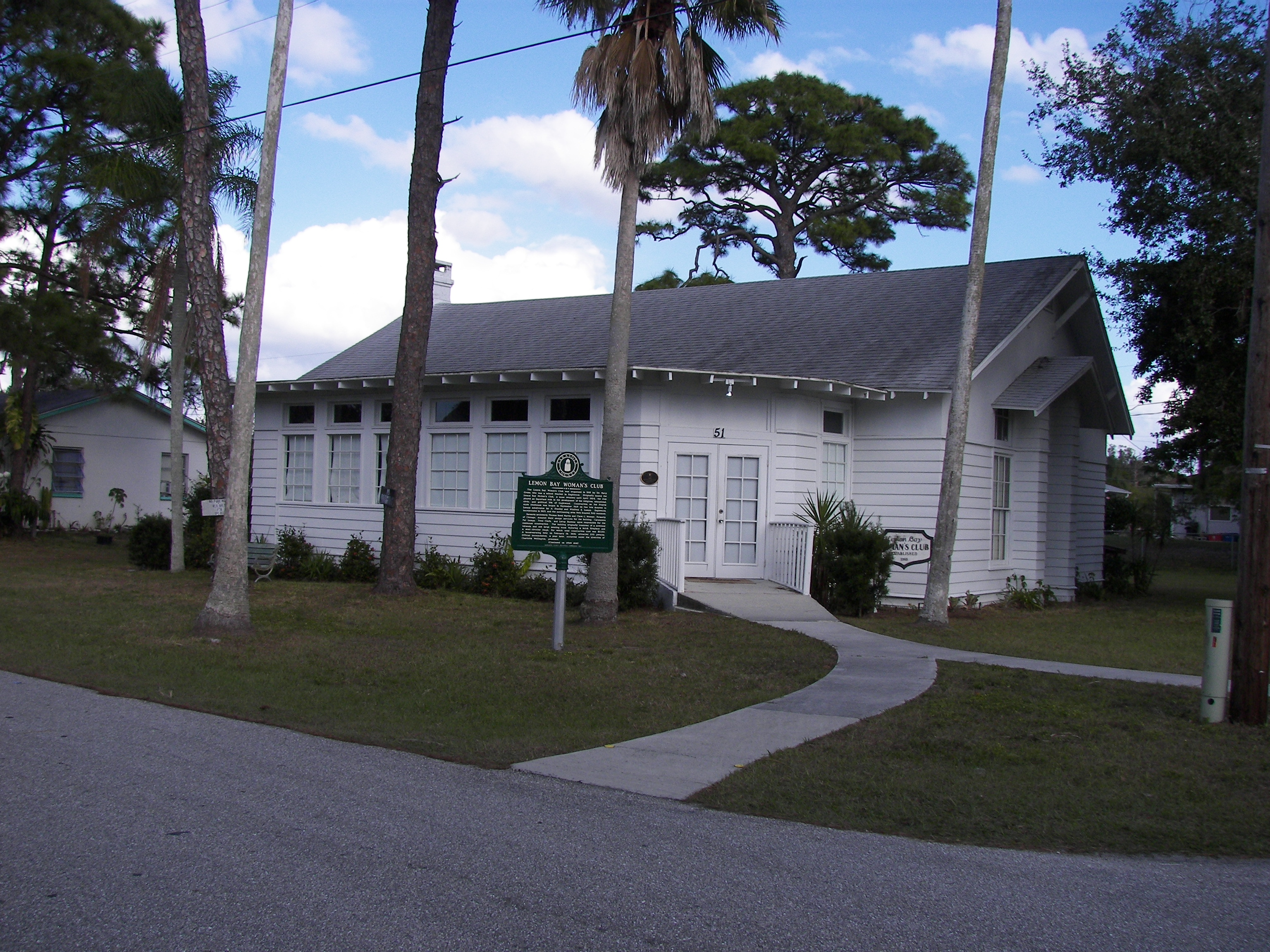

- Location within Florida Location within the United States
- Location: Englewood, Florida
- Coordinates: 26°57′48″N 82°21′28″W
- NRHP reference No.: 88001150
- Added to NRHP: August 11, 1988

The Lemon Bay Woman's Club is a historic woman's club in Englewood, Florida, United States. A center of community organizing, philanthropy, and formerly of worship, it is located at 51 North Maple Street. On August 11, 1988, it was added to the U.S. National Register of Historic Places.

Organized by Dr. Mary Green, a school teacher in Englewood, it was known as the Lemon Bay Mother's Club until April 1924. It was a center of religious, educational, civic and political life of Englewood.

Construction on the prairie style clubhouse was begun in September 1925 on two lots donated in Lampp subdivision by A. Stanley and Winifred E. Lampp. Englewood, incorporated in 1925, and the surrounding area then boasted 300 residents.

Sarasota architects Thomas Reed Martin and Clare C, Hosmer, formerly of Chicago, donated their design services for the building. Carpenters Pat Lampp, Fred Clark, and Leroy Bastedo were responsible for the clubhouse construction. The building originally consisted of a screened veranda and one large meeting room featuring a brick fireplace and a semi-circular stage, for which total construction cost was 3,120. A housewarming held on February 19, 1926, attracted 200 persons. Official incorporation, a year later, occurred under the direction of Charlotte Wellington, president.

In 1922, under the leadership of Mrs. Hallie Green, members started a school library and maintained a lending library at the club until 1962. Surviving the depression and the loss of its $37 treasury when banks failed, the club continued to hold fish fries, nature study classes, dances, card parties, plays, musical programs, travelogues and lectures. The club retired its mortgage on February 24, 1938. The note was burned at a gala meeting on March 4, 1938

Between 1926 and 1970, the club served as a sanctuary for many Englewood churches and as a meeting place for various organizations. The Englewood Community Church was the first congregation to meet at the club. Others included the Community Presbyterian Church, First Baptist Church, St. Raphael's Catholic Church, St. David's Episcopal Church, Evangelical Free Church, Church of God, Church of Christ, First Methodist Church, and Calvary Baptist Church. During World War II the building was turned over to the American Red Cross. The club was the first building in Englewood to be listed in the National Register of Historic Places.

== See also ==
- List of Woman's Clubhouses in Florida on the National Register of Historic Places
- National Register of Historic Places listings in Sarasota County, Florida
- National Register of Historic Places listings in Charlotte County, Florida

== Gallery ==
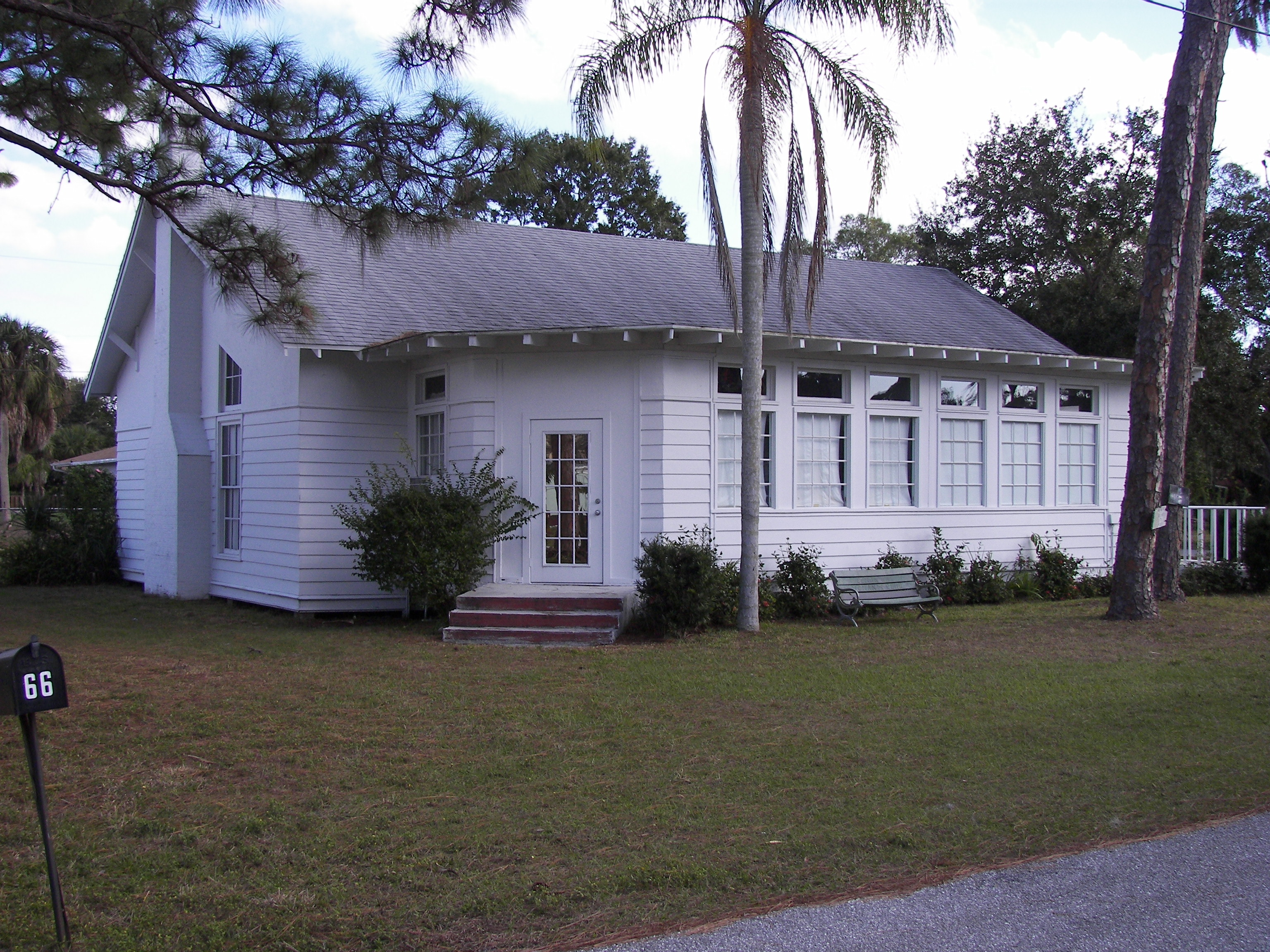

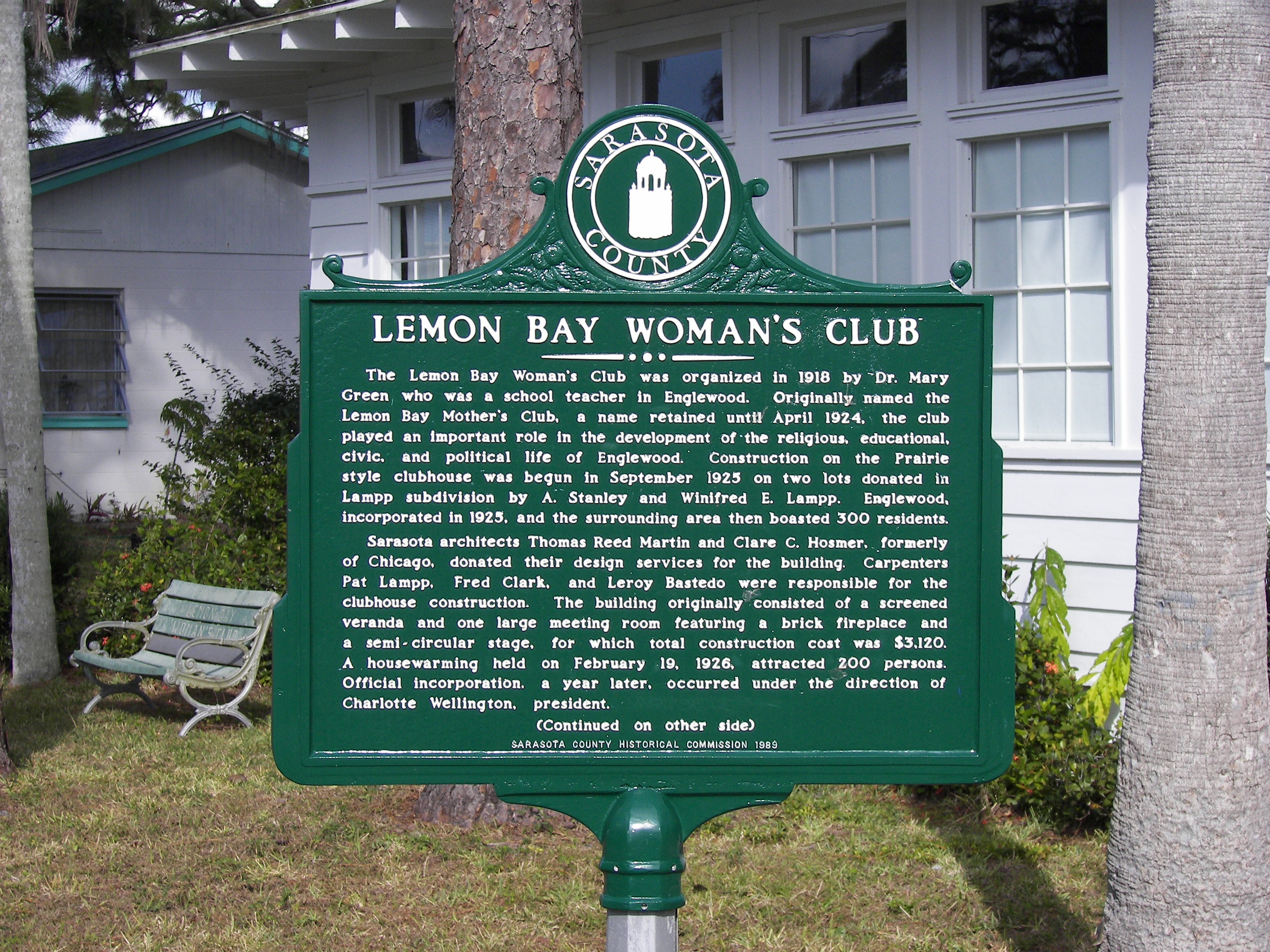

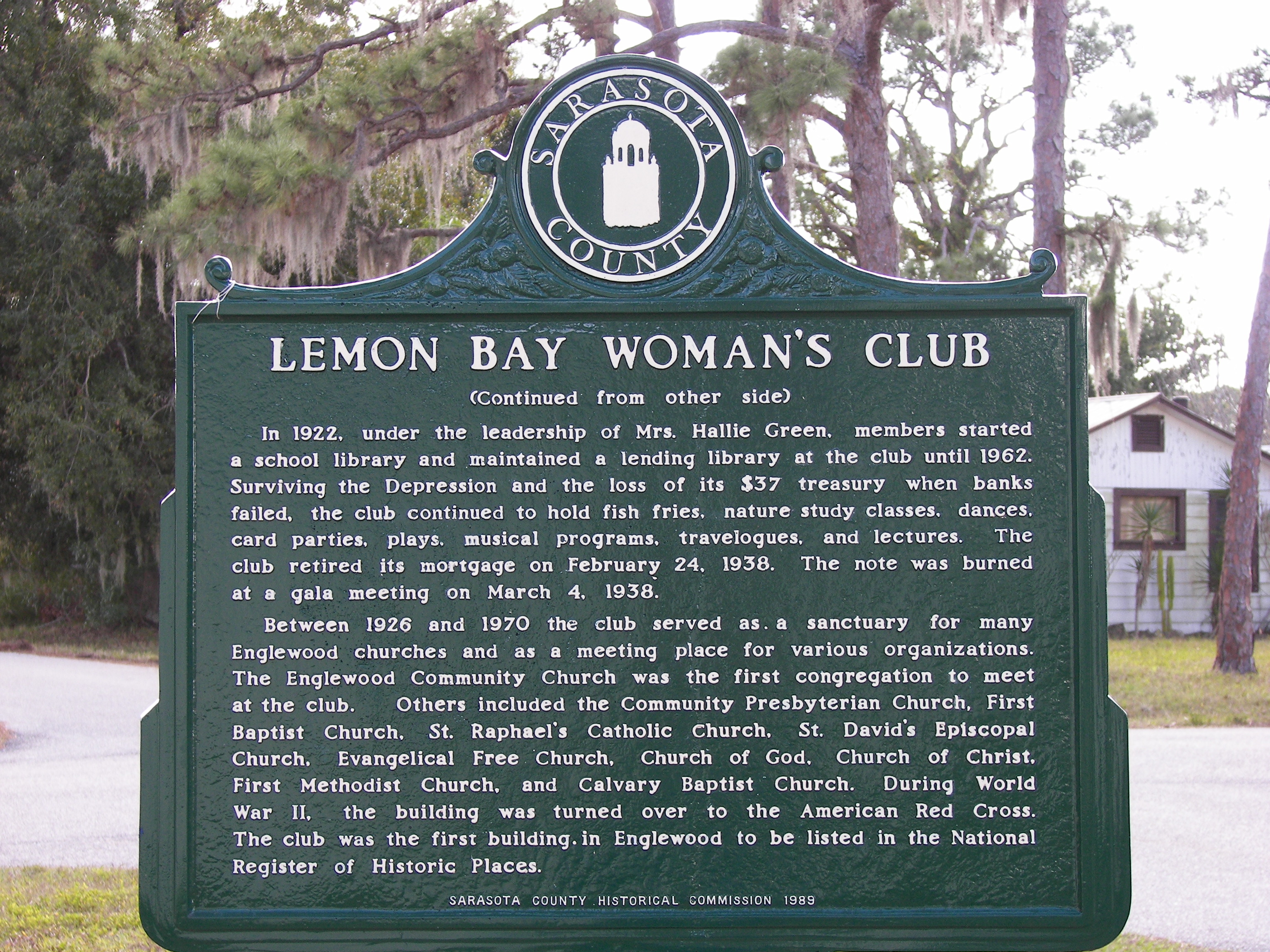
