= William J. Burns House =

Historic house in Florida, United States

- U.S. National Register of Historic Places
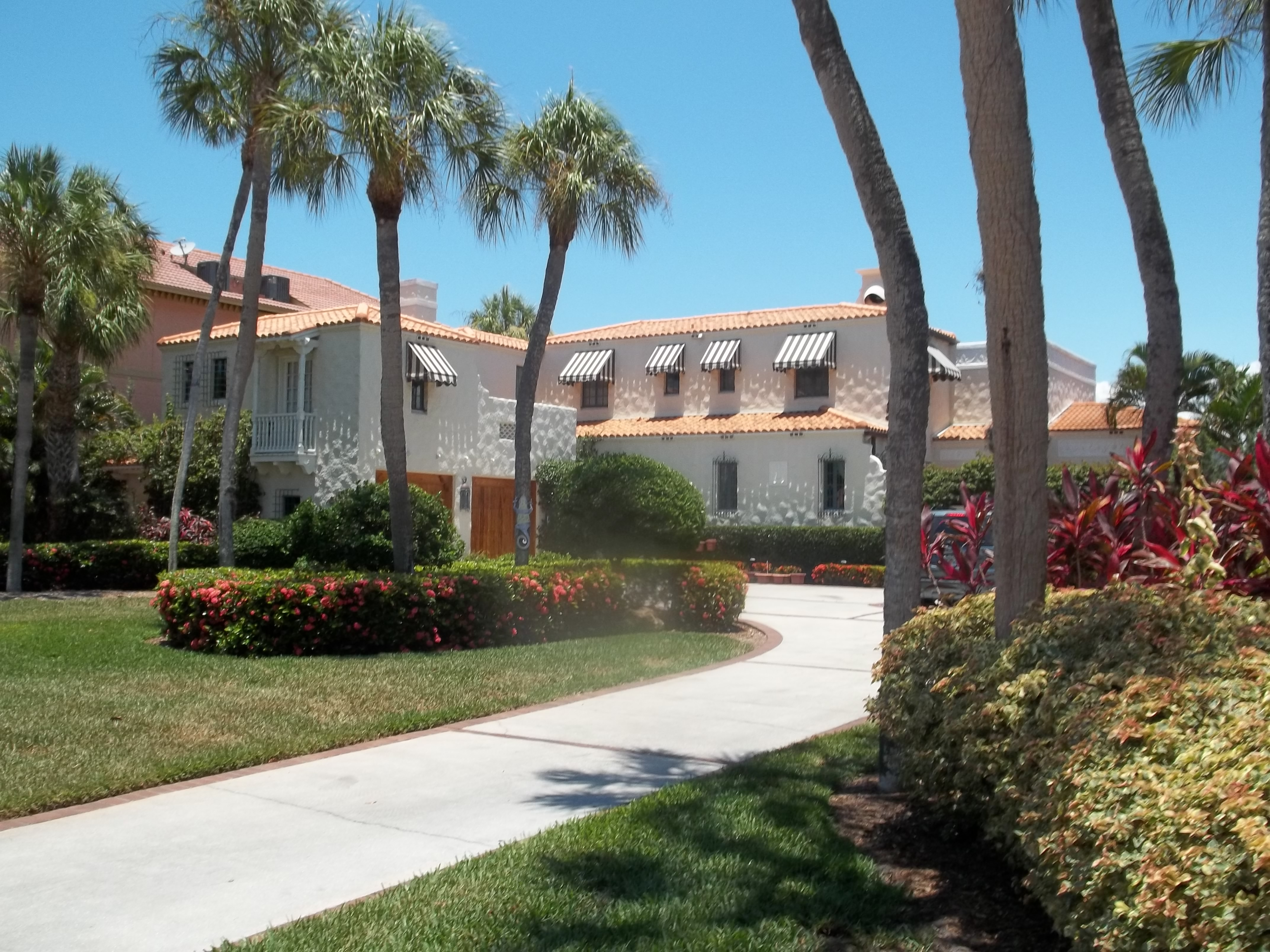

- Location within Florida
- Location: Sarasota, Florida
- Coordinates: 27°19′7″N 82°34′27″W
- Area: 3,500 sq ft
- Built: 1927
- Architect: Thomas Reed Martin
- Architectural style: Mission/Spanish Revival
- NRHP reference No.: 97000248
- Added to NRHP: March 21, 1997

The William J. Burns House is a historic house located at 47 South Washington Drive in Sarasota, Florida. It is locally significant as an excellent example of the Mediterranean Revival style, as well as the work of local architect Thomas Reed Martin.

== Description and history ==
It is a 2-story, Mediterranean Revival style house with an irregular floor plan. It rests on a concrete foundation and has exterior walls of stucco. Most of the house is covered with hipped roof segments, surfaced with clay barrel tiles. A few areas of the roof are flat due to its extensive use of built-up roofing material. Scuppers are placed right below the roof line at intervals around the house.

It was added to the National Register of Historic Places on March 21, 1997.

== References and external links ==
- Sarasota County listings at National Register of Historic Places
- William J. Burns House at Portal of Historic Resources, State of Florida
