= Casa Del Mar =

Historic house in Florida, United States

- U.S. National Register of Historic Places
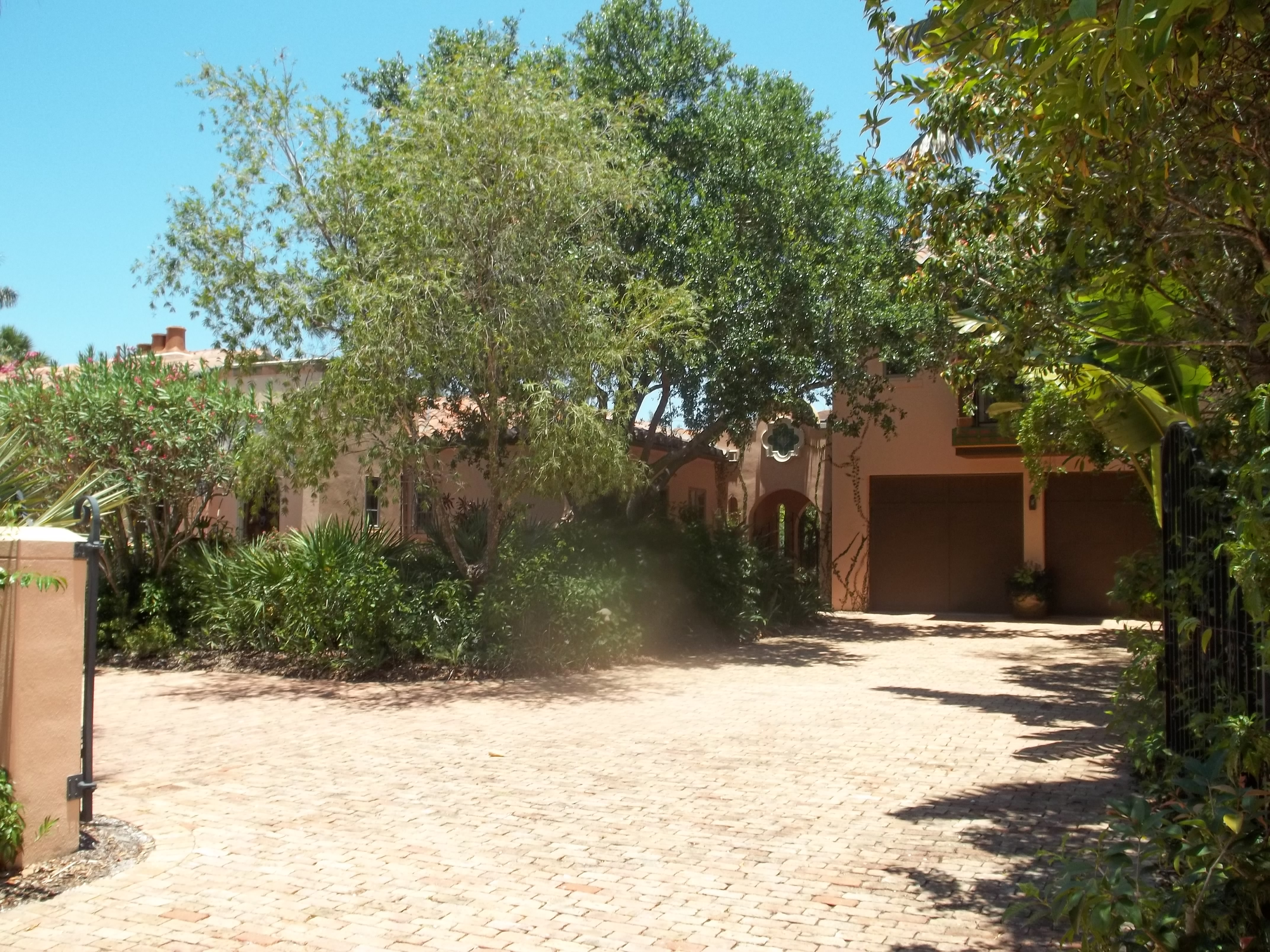

- Location within Florida Location within the United States
- Location: Sarasota, Florida
- Coordinates: 27°19′9″N 82°34′28″W
- Architectural style: Mission/Spanish Revival, Moderne, Art Deco
- NRHP reference No.: 97000051
- Added to NRHP: 14 February 1997

Casa Del Mar (also known as the Thomas Case House) is a historic house located at 25 South Washington Drive in Sarasota, Florida.

== Description and history ==
On February 14, 1997, it was added to the National Register of Historic Places. Thomas Reed Martin is credited as the home's architect.
