= Thomas Reed Martin =

American architect

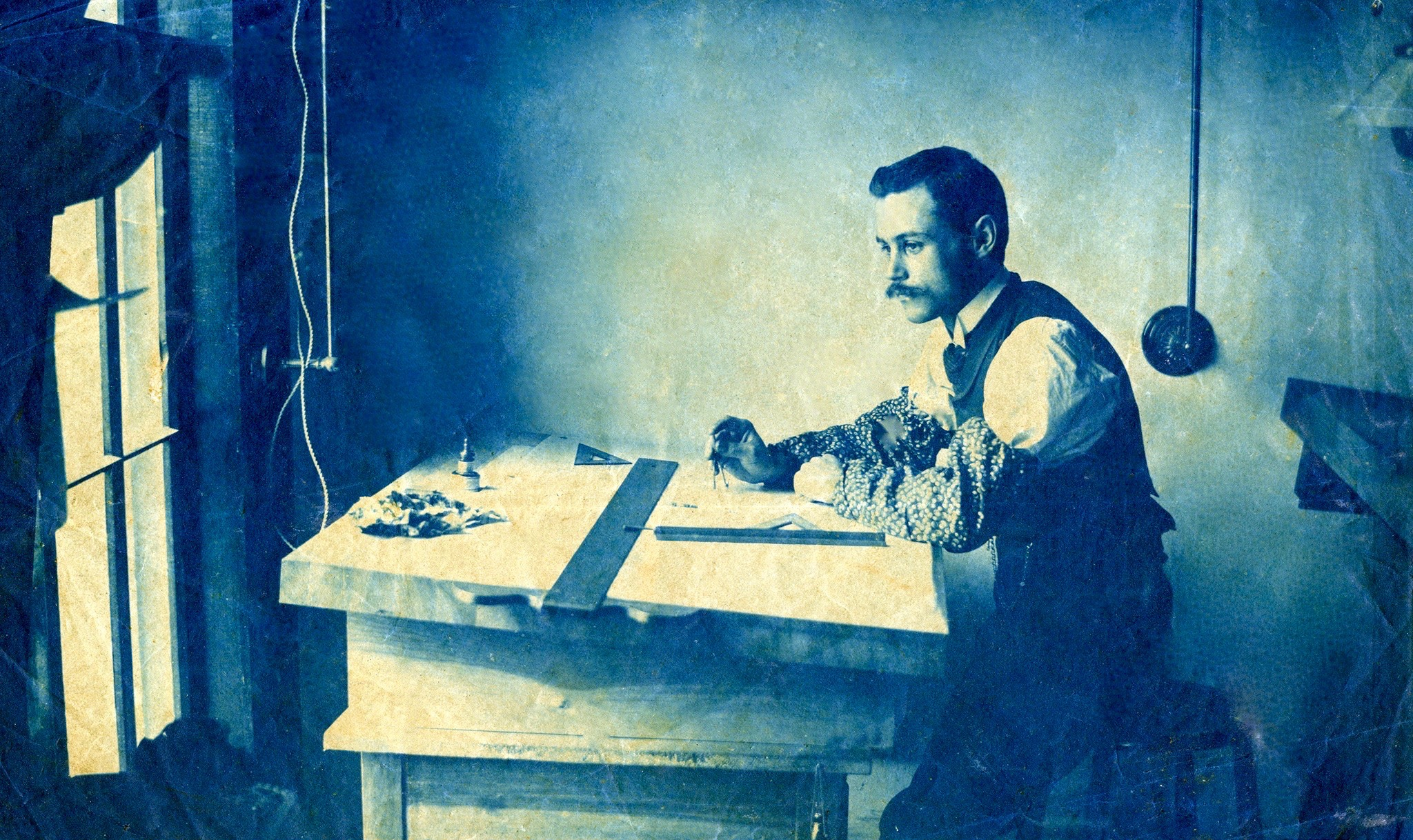
- Thomas Reed Martin c. 1900
- Born: April 28, 1866; Menasha, Wisconsin
- Died: February 1949 (aged 82)
- Occupation: Architect

Sarasota Municipal Auditorium

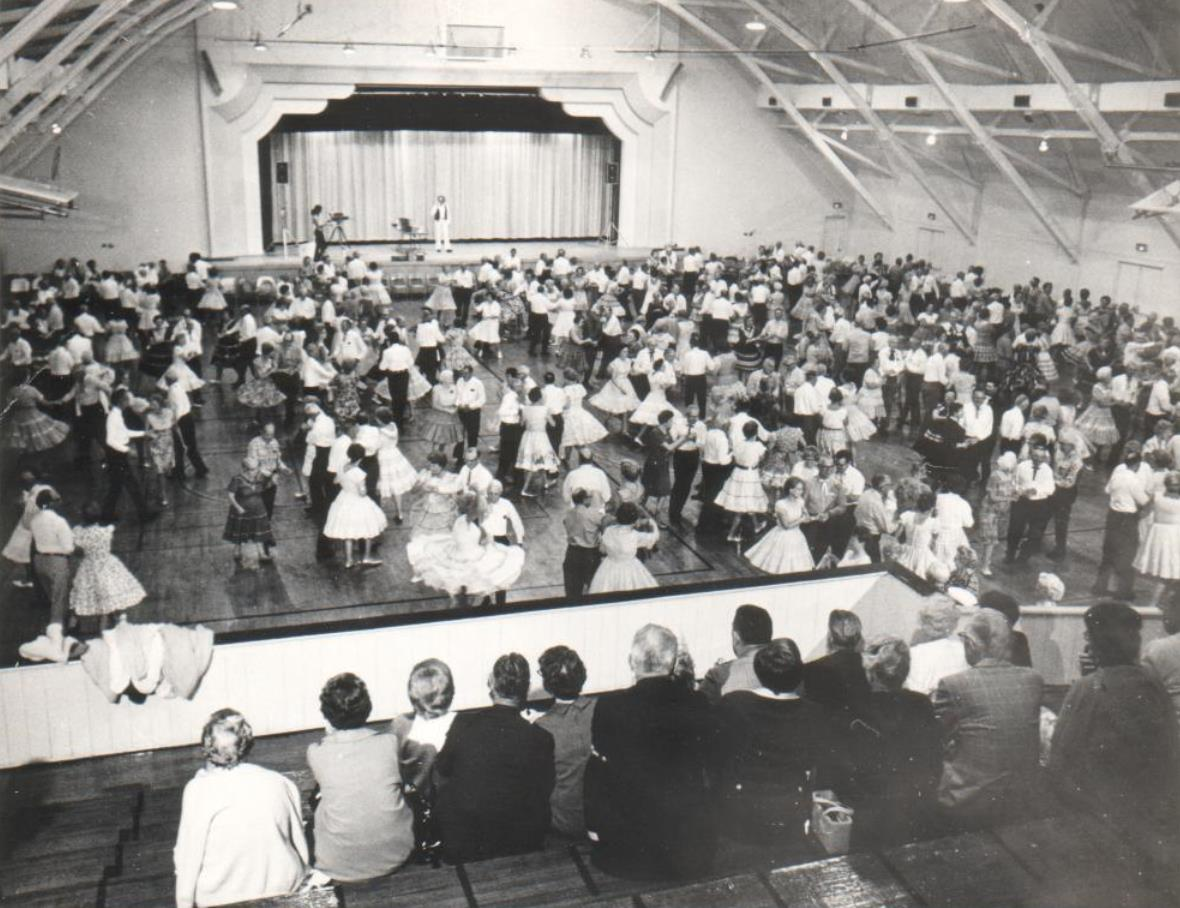
Interior of Sarasota Municipal Auditorium

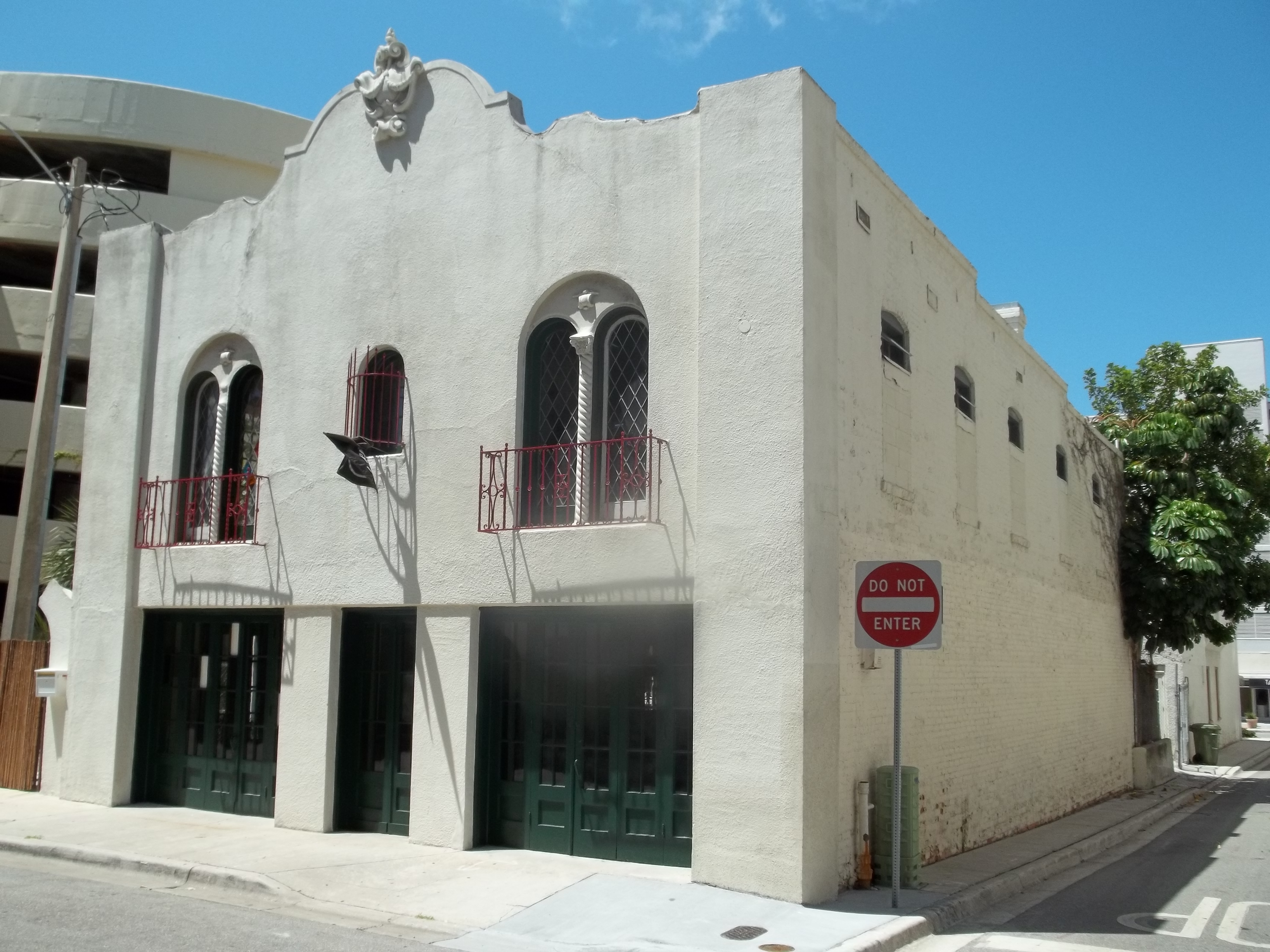
Roth Cigar Factory, Sarasota

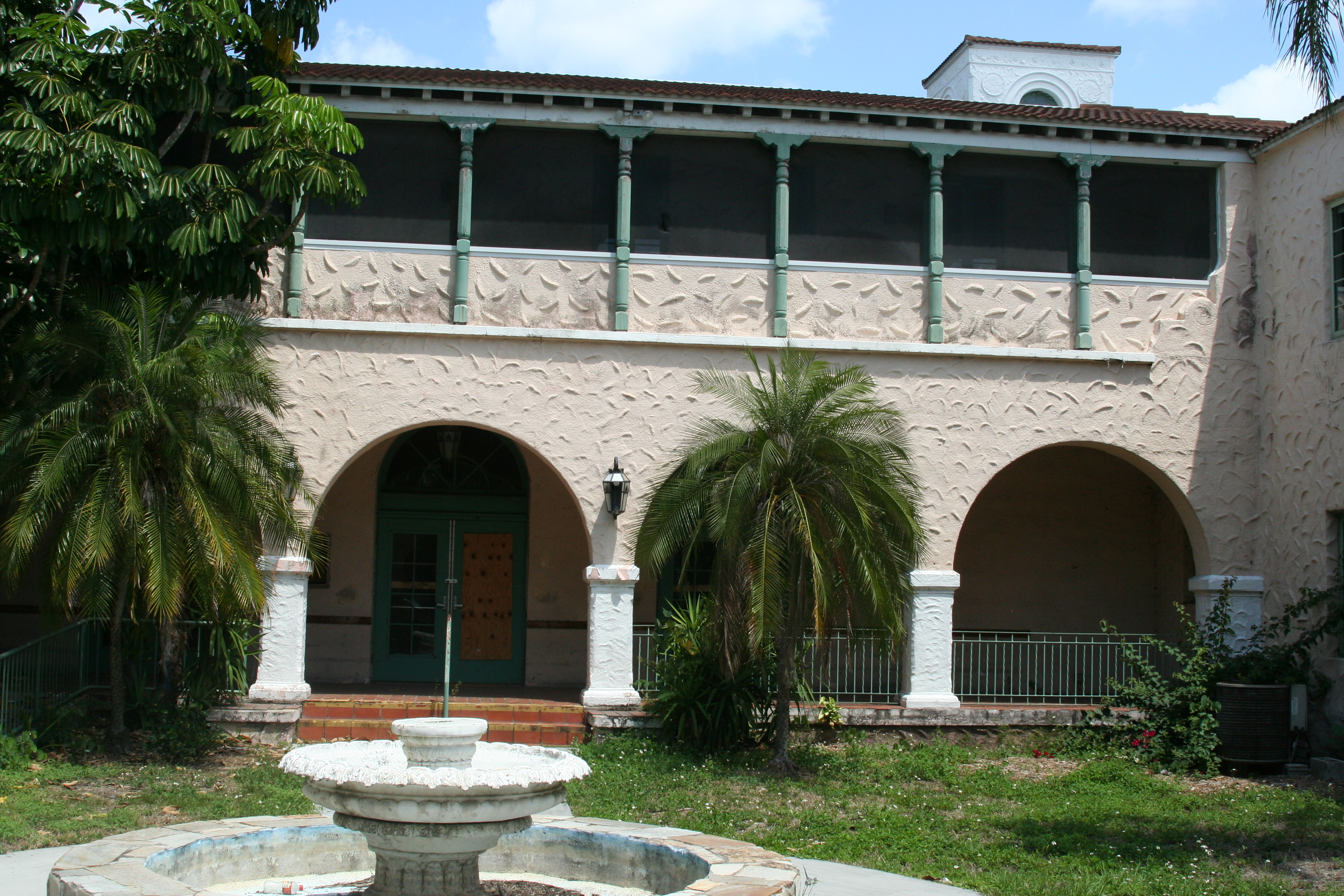
Courtyard of the Hacienda Hotel

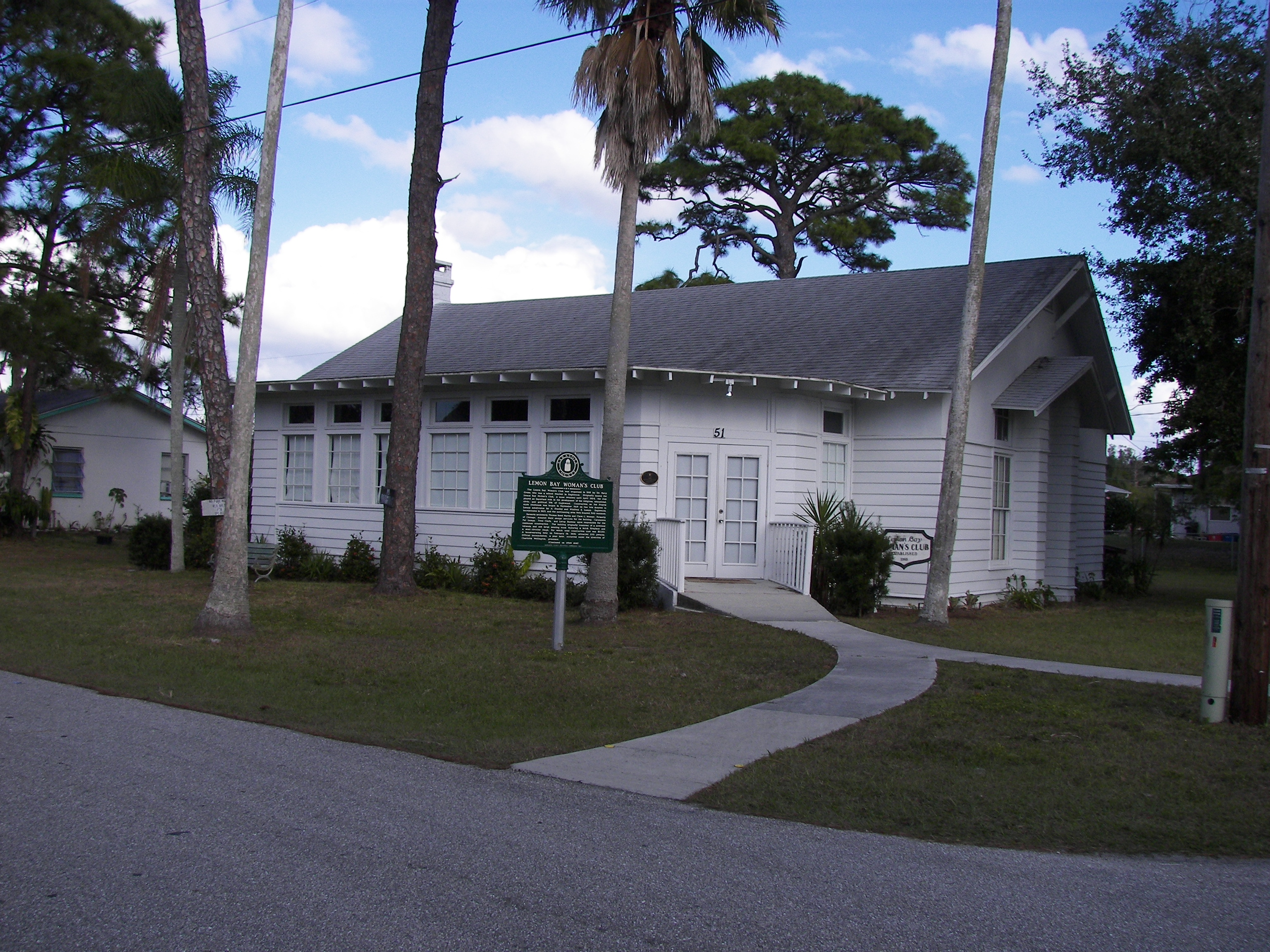
Lemon Bay Woman's Club

Thomas Reed Martin (April 28, 1866 in Menasha, Wisconsin – February 1949) was an architect who was brought to Florida by one of its major developers during the turn of the twentieth century. He designed some 500 residences and various public and private buildings in Sarasota, as well as commercial buildings. His Florida buildings are located from Tampa to Fort Myers with many in Nokomis.

He drew the original sketches for the home of Mable and John Ringling, but the design by Dwight James Baum was selected by Mable Ringling and built by Owen Burns after Martin declined a fee reduction proposed by John Ringling.

Many of Martin's buildings are listed in the National Register of Historic Places (NRHP). He was listed as a Great Floridian in 2000.

== History ==
Martin was the son of William Davidson Martin and Myra Martin. His family was part of the construction business for generations. He graduated from high school in Beaver Dam, Wisconsin, he moved with his family to Chicago in 1883. Thomas married Sadie W. Coffin on February 19, 1890. They had three sons and a daughter.

Martin was first employed as a draftsman with Global Machinery Co. in Chicago. He apprenticed with the architectural firm of Holabird and Roche in Chicago. At that firm, Martin met Chicago socialite and art patron, Bertha Palmer, the widow of Chicago real estate developer Potter Palmer. Palmer commissioned Holabird and Roche to design her large winter home in Sarasota. Sketches for the house bear Martin's trademark signature. She soon would become one of the largest landholders in Florida and she also became renowned for her real estate developments and the introduction of revolutionary agricultural and ranching practices in Florida.

At the age of forty-four, Martin came to the Sarasota area from Chicago to work for Palmer in the fall of 1910. He was joined by his wife and children in 1911. He set up his own practice, which flourished throughout the Florida land boom of the 1920s. Among the five hundred homes Martin designed in the Sarasota area, many are considered "Floridian" style homes which use glass block and formed concrete embellished with Mediterranean Revival features.

In the 1930s he and an unrelated architect, Clarence Augustine Martin who had retired to Sarasota after serving as Dean of the Architecture School at Cornell University, were the architects for the Sarasota Municipal Auditorium. It was a federal economic stimulus project.

== Some Florida designs ==
- William J. Burns House, St. Armands Key (NRHP listed)
- Case House, in Sarasota (NRHP listed)
- Columbia Restaurant, in Tampa
- Lemon Bay Woman's Club
- Hacienda Hotel (NRHP listed), in New Port Richey
- Roth Cigar Factory, in Sarasota (NRHP listed)
- Municipal Auditorium (also known as Sarasota Exhibition Hall) with Clarence A. Martin, a 1930s Works Progress Administration, in Sarasota (NRHP listed)
- L. D. Reagin House, in Sarasota (NRHP listed)
- Bacheller-Brewer Model Home Estate, in Sarasota (NRHP listed)
- H. B. William House, in Sarasota (NRHP listed)
- Chidsey Library, in Sarasota (NRHP listed)
