= Hacienda Hotel =

- The Hacienda Hotel
- U.S. National Register of Historic Places
- Location within Florida Location within the United States
- Location: New Port Richey, Florida
- Coordinates: 28°15′2″N 82°43′16.42″W
- Architect: Thomas Reed Martin
- Architectural style: Mission/Spanish Revival, Mediterranean Revival
- NRHP reference No.: 96001185
- Added to NRHP: October 24, 1996

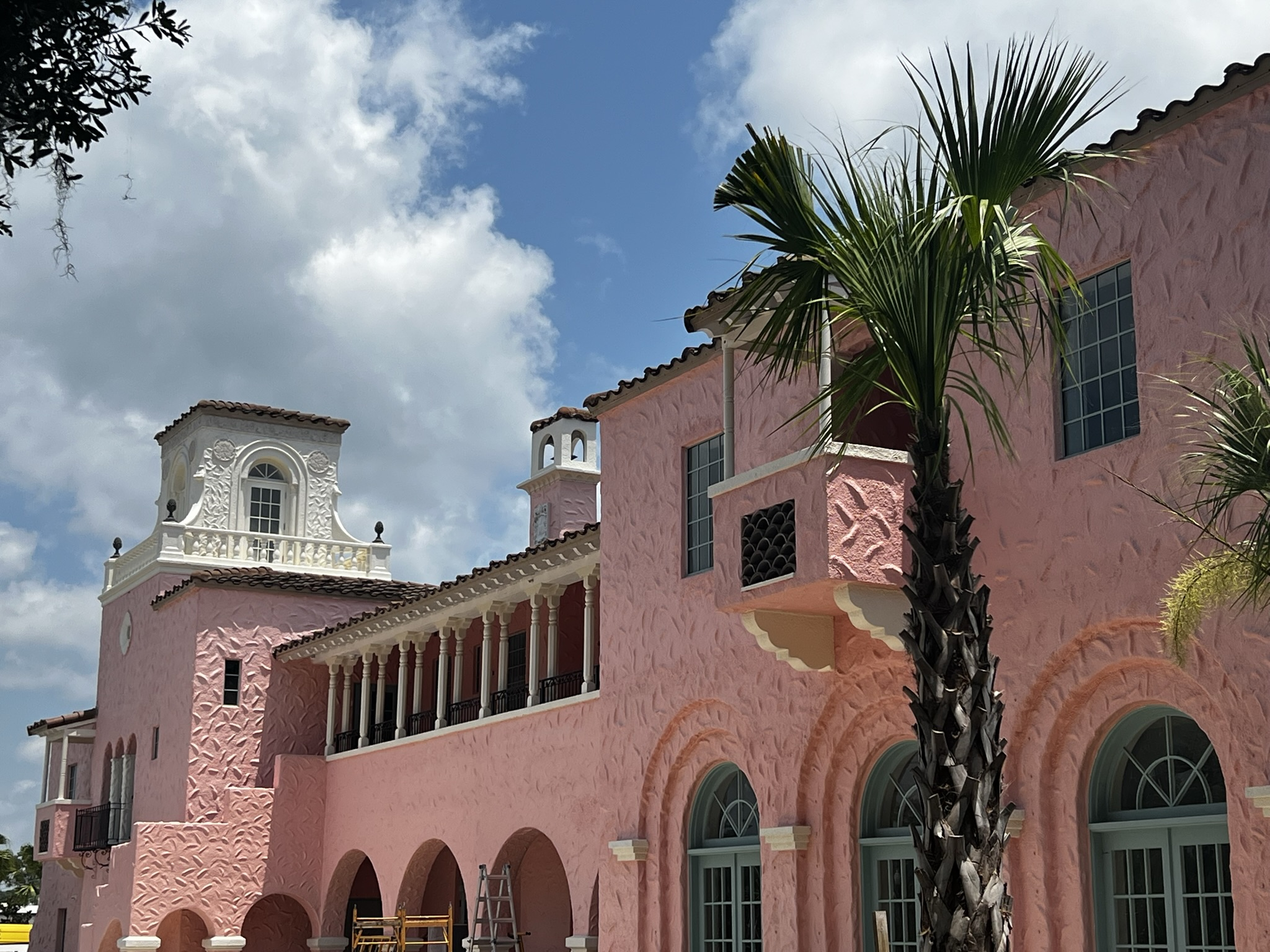

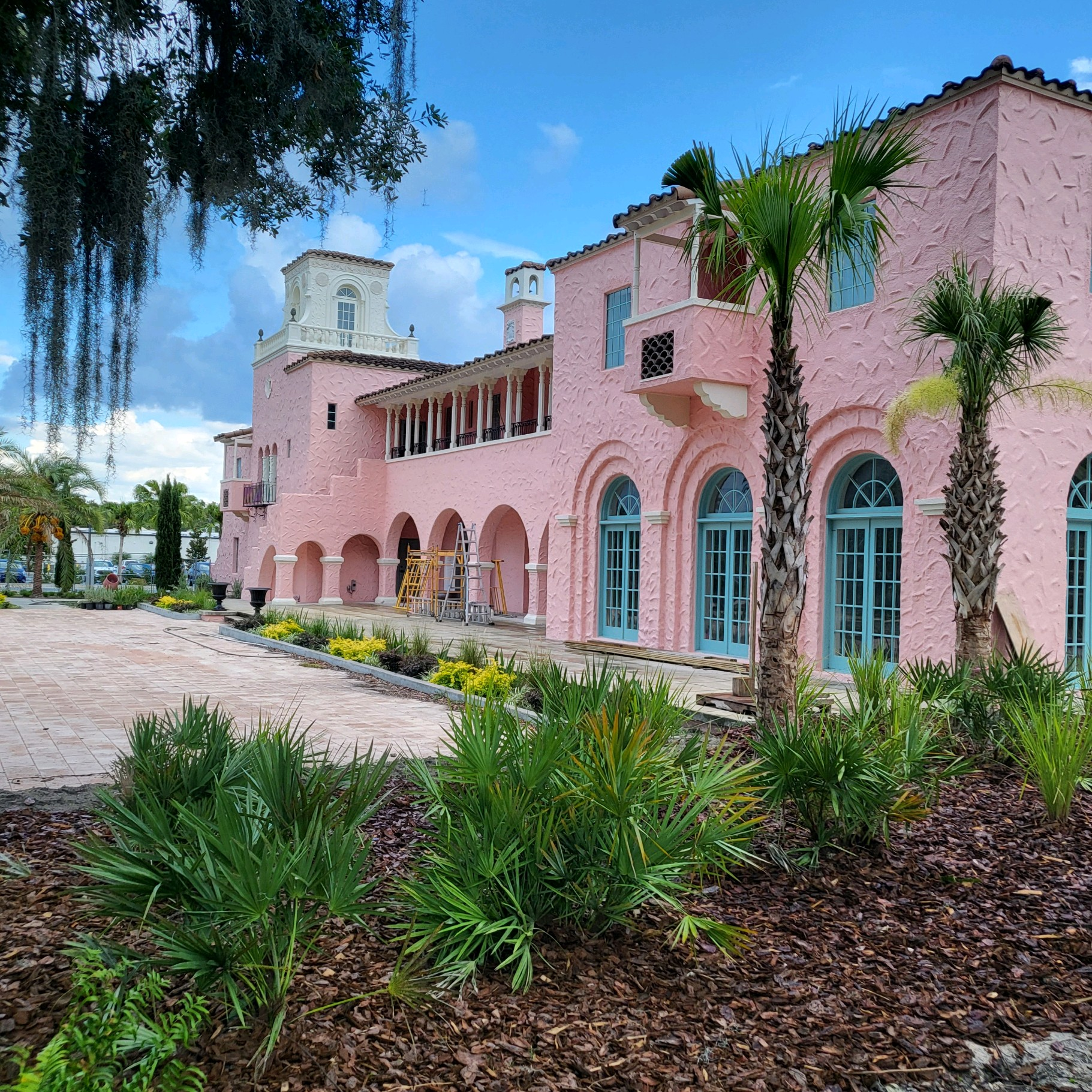

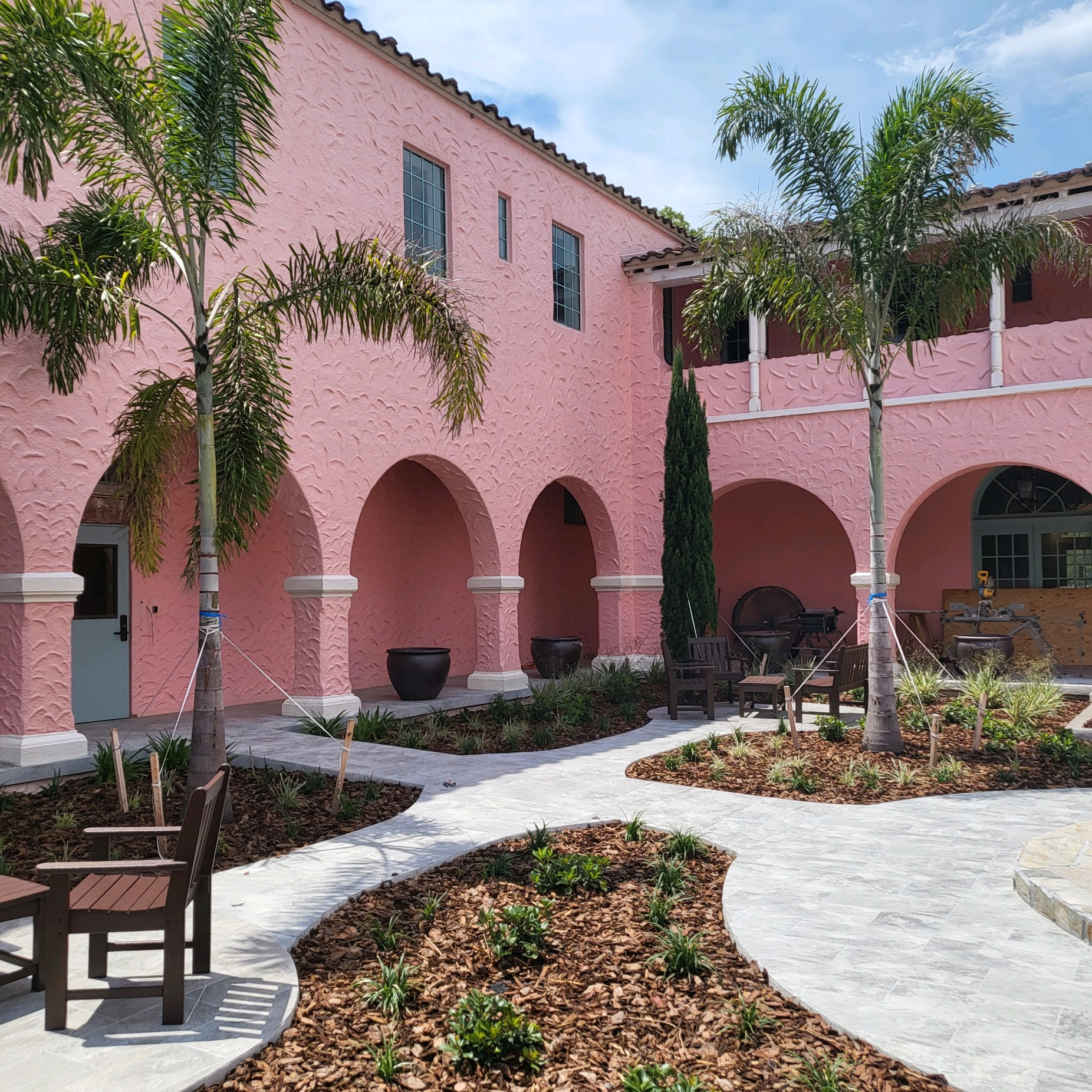
Courtyard of the Hacienda Hotel in April 2012

The Hacienda Hotel is a historic site in New Port Richey, Florida. It is located at 5621 Main Street. On October 24, 1996, it was added to the U.S. National Register of Historic Places. It was designed by Thomas Reed Martin.

The hotel originally opened in 1927. The city of New Port Richey bought the building in 2003.

The Hacienda opened as a hotel again when it reopened on September 15, 2022. The hotel features a full-service restaurant and bar, Sasha's On the Park.
