= Gulfcoast Wonder & Imagination Zone =

Defunct science museum in Sarasota, Florida

Gulfcoast Wonder and Imagination Zone
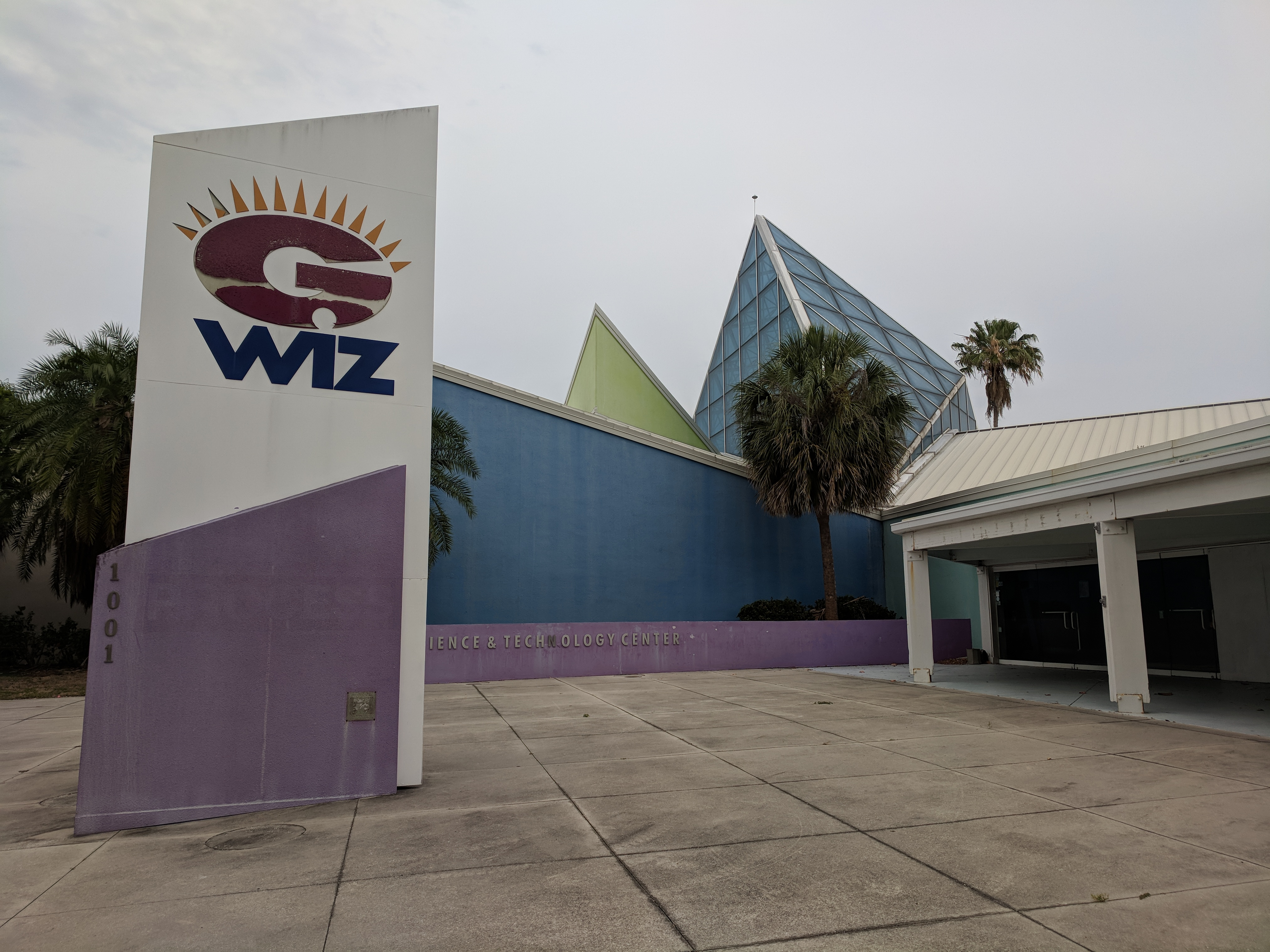
- Front of GWIZ Building
- Interactive map of the Gulfcoast Wonder and Imagination Zone area
- Former names: Selby Public Library (1976-1998)
- Alternative names: GWIZ Building

General information
- Status: Demolished
- Type: Government library, museum
- Location: Sarasota, Florida, 1001 Boulevard of the Arts, United States
- Coordinates: 27°20′30″N 82°33′00″W
- Completed: 1976
- Opened: June 24, 1976 (Library); August 26, 2000 (GWIZ)
- Renovated: 2000
- Closed: September 4, 2012
- Demolished: May 2019
- Owner: Sarasota

Technical details
- Floor count: 2
- Floor area: 30,000 ft^{2} (2,800 m^{2})

Design and construction
- Architect: Walter Netsch
- Architecture firm: Skidmore, Owings & Merrill

Renovating team
- Architect: Dale Parks
- Renovating firm: D/Parks Architect

The Gulfcoast Wonder & Imagination Zone, referred to as G.WIZ or GWIZ, was a science museum located in Sarasota, Florida neighboring the Sarasota Bay. The museum was in operation from August 2000 to September 2012. The museum was home to the Blivas Science & Technology Center. The building was demolished in May 2019 as part of the city's "The Bay" redevelopment plan of the Sarasota Bayfront.

== History ==
The science museum began in December 1990 as a 1,000-square-foot (93 m^{2}) room within the Florida West Coast Symphony building under the name Gulf Coast World of Science (GCWS). The nonprofit organization moved to a bigger location after it was awarded a 20-year lease with the Sarasota City Commission in January 1998. The location was the former Selby Public Library.

The building was originally home to Selby Public Library after the library moved from the Chidsey Library in 1976. The building was designed by Walter Netsch from Skidmore, Owings & Merrill and incorporated his "Field Theory" aesthetic. The library relocated its operations to downtown Sarasota in 1998. The building was then remodeled, GCWS renamed to Gulfcoast Wonder & Imagination Zone (GWIZ), and the new museum opened to the public on August 26, 2000.

== Closure ==
The science museum closed to the general public on September 4, 2012, to make renovations. The renovations were planned to modernize the museum and to give the museum ten zones that included themes of geography, dinosaurs, the Florida Gulf Coast, outer space, science, and mathematics.

GWIZ's website at the time announced renovations were coming and stated, “We are working hard to bring you GWIZ 2.0!” However, the nonprofit organization was also in default to the city's lease. The lease of the building to GWIZ was officially terminated by the city on September 21, 2013. The building sat vacant until its demolition in 2019.

== Demolition ==
A master plan of the redevelopment project for the Sarasota Bayfront area known as "The Bay" was approved by the Sarasota City Commission on September 6, 2018. The project's initial phase included demolishing the GWIZ building in place of a recreational pier. The building was demolished in May 2019.
