= Chidsey Library =

Historic building in Sarasota, Florida

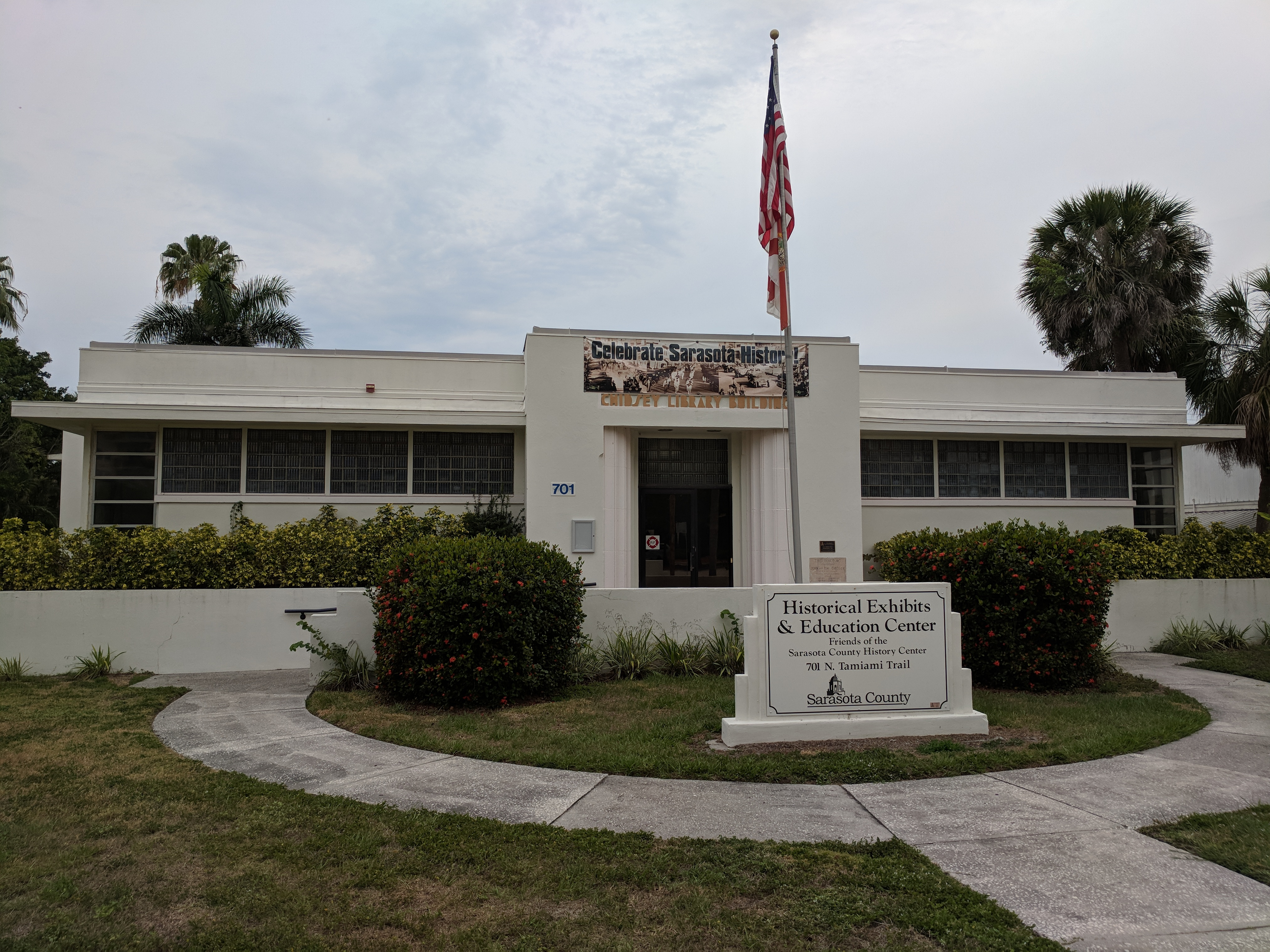
- Front of Chidsey Library
- Interactive map of the Chidsey Library area
- Alternative names: Chidsey Building

General information
- Type: Government library
- Architectural style: Mediterranean Revival; Art Moderne
- Location: 701 North Tamiami Trail, Sarasota, Florida, United States
- Coordinates: 27°20′32″N 82°32′51″W
- Named for: John and Ida Chidsey
- Construction started: May 12, 1941
- Inaugurated: November 13, 1941
- Owner: Sarasota

Technical details
- Floor count: 2

Design and construction
- Architects: Thomas Reed Martin; Frank C. Martin
- Architecture firm: Martin Studio of Architecture
- Chidsey Library
- U.S. National Register of Historic Places
- Location within Florida Location within the United States
- NRHP reference No.: 11000241
- Added to NRHP: May 4, 2011

The Chidsey Library or Chidsey Building is a historic building located in Sarasota, Florida, at 701 North Tamiami Trail. The building was home to the city's first public library from 1941 to 1976.

== History ==
The library's Mediterranean Revival design was done by Martin Studio of Architecture consisting of Thomas Reed Martin and Frank C. Martin. The Chidsey Library opened in May 1941 as the Sarasota's first public library building. The building was dedicated to John and Ida Chidsey in November 1941 as they made the building possible by helping pay for the majority of the cost for the project, which was approximately $25,000, equivalent to $410,000 in 2024. The library held approximately 18,000 books in 1946.

In 1974, Sarasota County assumed responsibility for maintaining all public county libraries. The building was used as a library until 1976, when library operations moved to Selby Library at the former GWIZ building located at 1001 Boulevard of the Arts. Sarasota County Historical Resources moved into a portion of the Chidsey Library. The county's Historical Resources fully occupied the Chidsey Building in 1998, when library operations moved to its current location at Selby Public Library.

The building was added to the National Register of Historic Places (NRHP) on May 4, 2011.
