= Selby Library =

Library in Sarasota, Florida, U.S.

Selby Public Library
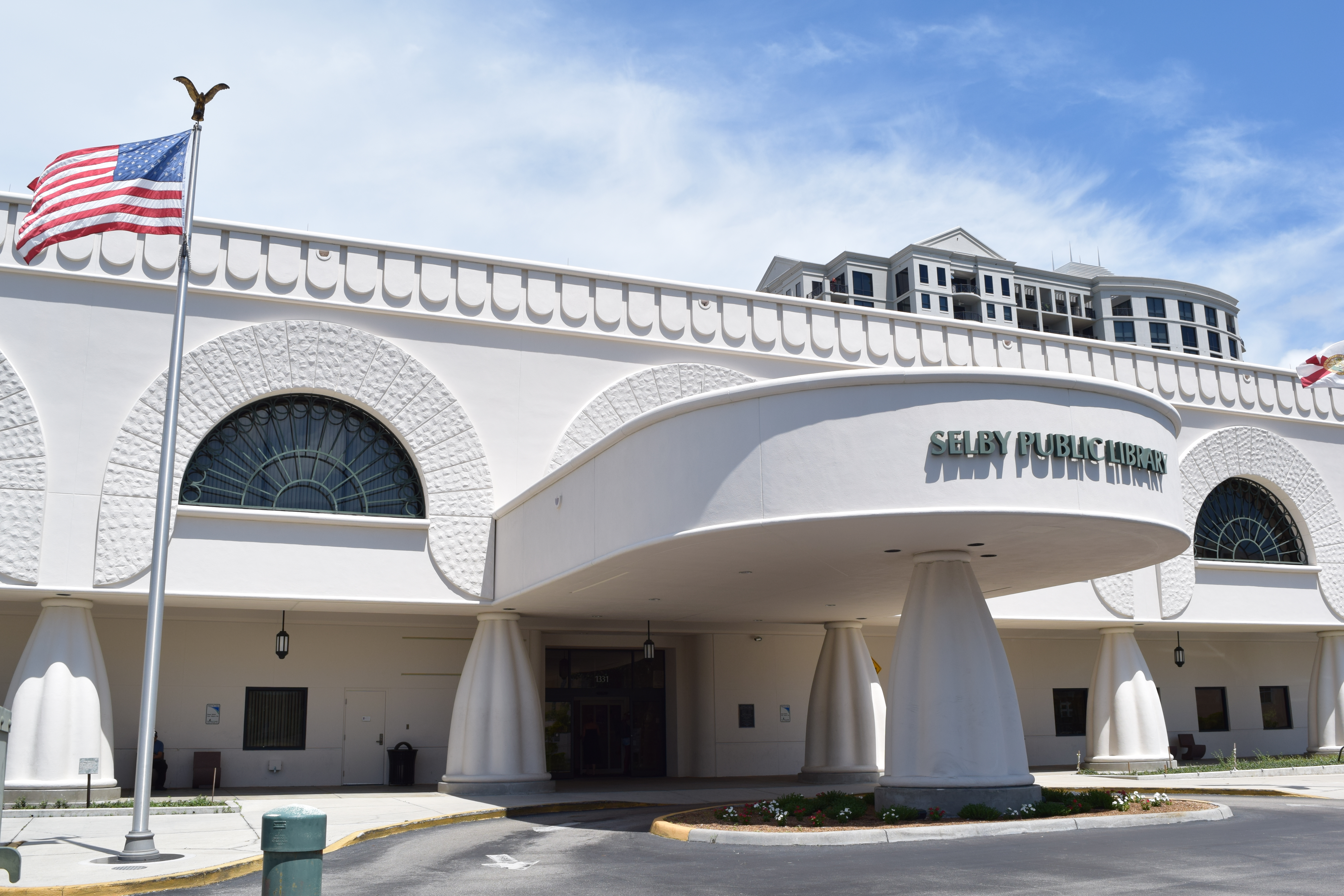
- Main entrance to Selby Public Library
- 27°20′14″N 82°32′36″W
- Location: 1331 1st Street; Sarasota, Florida 34236
- Type: Public library
- Established: 1907; 1998 (current building)
- Branch of: Sarasota County Public Library System

Collection
- Size: 810,609

Access and use
- Circulation: 2,905,809 (2014)
- Population served: 367,867

Other information
- Website: www.scgov.net/library/

The Selby Public Library or Selby Library was the first library in Sarasota County, Florida and was established in 1907. The current building is the largest public library in Sarasota County and serves the downtown district of Sarasota, Florida.

== History ==
The Selby Public Library (originally known as the Sarasota Public Library) originated when the Town Improvement Society established a library room at Five Points with a fund of $65, equivalent to $2,000 in 2024. It first began with a contribution of books and 51 subscribers. In 1913, the Woman's Club took over the library and was relocated to the east wing of the Women's Club in 1915. The Sarasota City Council appropriated $150 per year to locate the library in the old schoolhouse on Main Street rent-free for five years. In 1940, the Women's Club requested that the city take absolute control of the library, so the city moved it to Chidsey Library. As more people relocated to the county by the mid-1970s, the increasing need for additional books and materials was evident. The library soon progressed to the Boulevard of the Arts site on June 24, 1976, and Sarasota County Historical Resources took over its operation. After a large contribution of $500,000 from the William G. and Marie Selby Foundation, it was named Selby Library. The Selby Foundation provided the largest single contribution to building the Selby Public Library. Other funds came from city, county, and federal governments and private donations. William and Marie Selby had been boosters of Sarasota, beginning around 1910 when they first came and visited the city in the winter. With money from the Selby Oil and Gas Company, the Selby's were able to invest much wealth into Sarasota, including the donation provided to the library by their trust.

== Architects and construction ==
The current Selby Library building was designed by architect Eugene Aubry, who also designed the Wortham Theater Center and Richland Library. Constructed in 1998 and at 73,000 square feet (6,800 m^{2}), Selby Library is the largest library facility in the County library system. Selby Library is a two-story building with a large central foyer enhanced by a mobile underwritten by the Art in Public Places program. Meeting space, including a 200-seat auditorium, is an important feature of the library. The Friends of the Library group operates a bookstore, the proceeds from which contribute to library enhancements. Parking has been at a premium since the building opened, and various approaches have been tried to address this issue. By 2005, a two-hour parking was established, with library-use-only enforced during the busiest season.

The building's Youth Library, named The Calvin and Kathryn L. Bean Children's Room, features a salt water aquarium called the Dee and Charles Stottlemyer Children's Aquarium. The aquarium is arch-shaped and forms the entrance to the youth library. It holds 3,200 US gallons (12,000 L; 2,700 imp gal) of water, weighs 10,000 pounds (4,500 kg) empty, and is 4-foot-wide (1.2 m), 12-foot-tall (3.7 m), and 16-foot-long (4.9 m). Designed by architects Gary Hoyt and Jeff Hole with assistance from Kevin Curlee, Mote Aquarium Curator, the aquarium was funded by Dee and Charles Stottlemyer. It was installed on July 8, 1999, and tropical fish were added to the tank on August 16, 1999. The aquarium was dedicated on October 23, 1999.

The bookstore at the Selby Public Library was renovated in 2017 to expand accessibility and improve visibility. A grand reopening was hosted on October 20–21, 2017.

== Today ==
The Selby Public Library is the largest in the Sarasota County Library system. Friends of the Selby Public Library is a 501(c)(3) that has donated over $1 million to the library over the past 10 years. Donations include $15,000 in support for over 100 free youth programs and events, $4,200 for the presentation of more than 60 free special events and programs for adults and over $22,000 for the coordination, organization, orientation and support of Selby Library Volunteers. One of their highlight events in the past was the Crystal Ball: The People's Gala fundraiser

The Sarasota Music Archive is a part of the "special collections" department of the Selby Public Library. The Sarasota Music Archive "contains several hundred thousand recordings, tapes, books, sheet music, and memorabilia". The Sarasota Music Archive merged with the Selby Public Library in 2000; although it was established in 1980. Mildred Petrie was the founder and the original location for the archive was in a strip mall. There are 14 Board Members with varied expertise in music and a solid core of volunteers help maintain and run the collection. The Sarasota Music Archive is located on the second floor of the Selby Public Library, and sells vinyl LP's, CD's and other musical items in its store.

Selby Library is also home to the largest "Creation Station" makerspace in Sarasota County with access to items like 3D printers, sewing machines, Cricut die cutting machines, Glowforge machine, and more.

Selby also hosts several art installations, including a mobile by artist Tim Prentice called 'Just Browsing' as part of the Sarasota Arts in Public Places project. The bronze sculpture 'Sharing' was created by artist Bruno Lucchesi, installed in 2002, and depicts a family reading. Another bronze piece called 'Best Friends' depicts a young boy reading a book with his dog by his side, and is by Chris Navarro. The statue was gifted to the library by Richard and Jean Ehlers and Family on December 14, 2000.

== Gallery ==
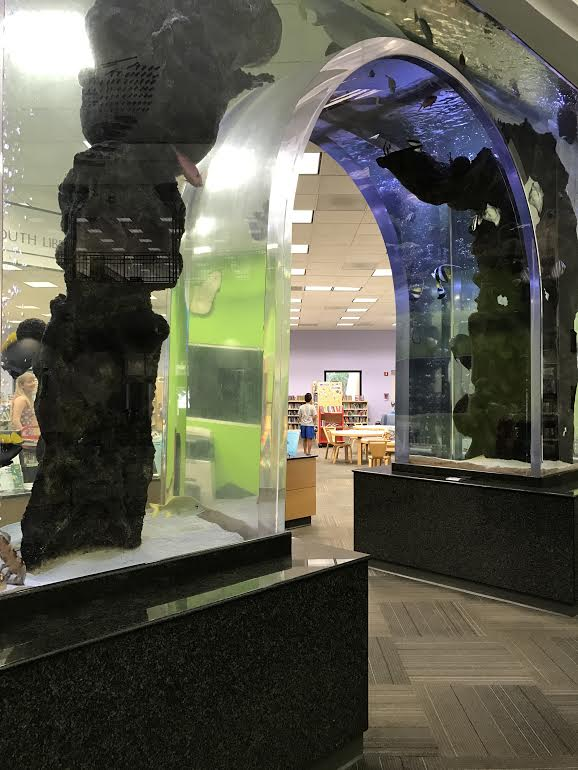
Entrance of Children's Aquarium

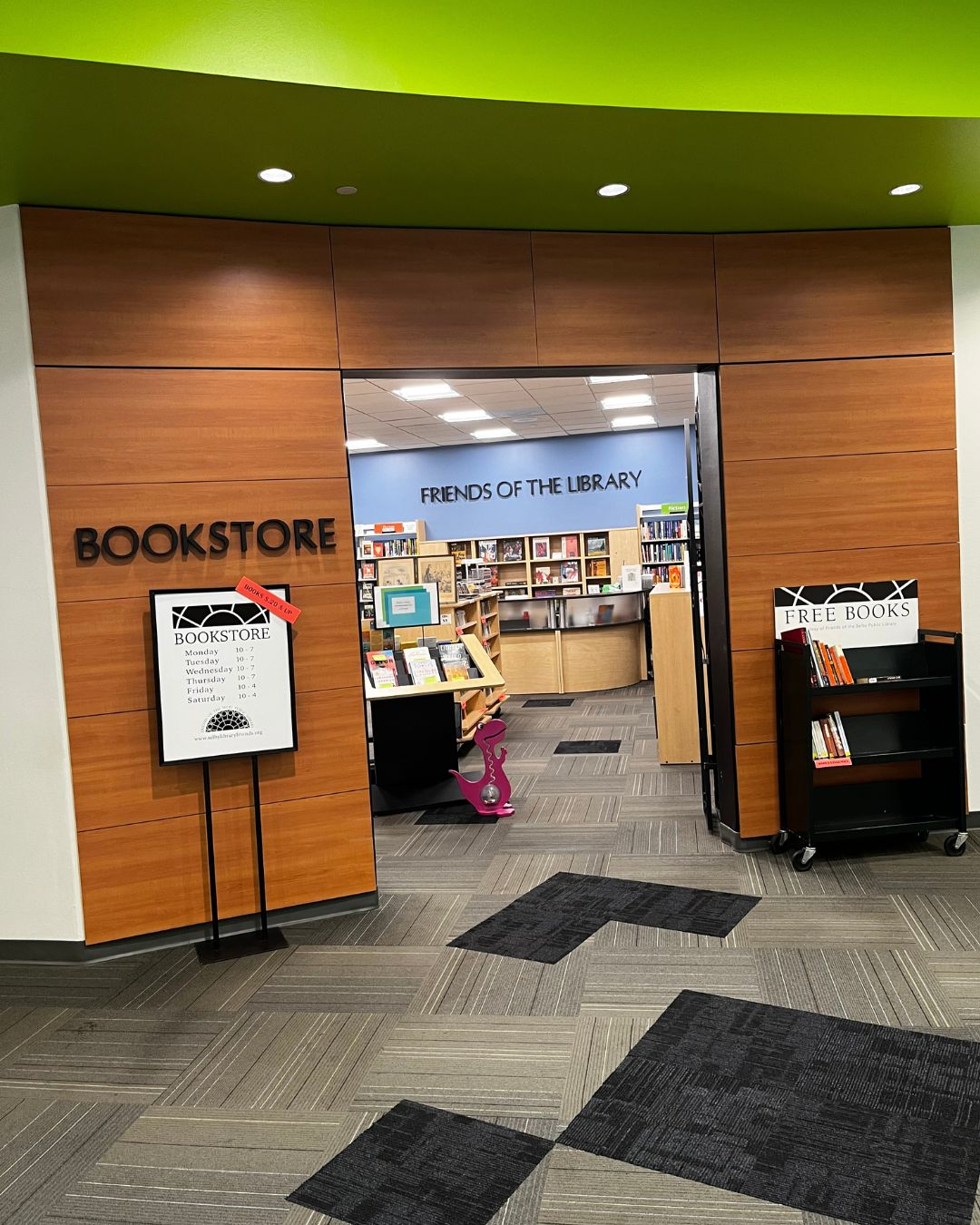
The Friends Bookstore at Selby Library

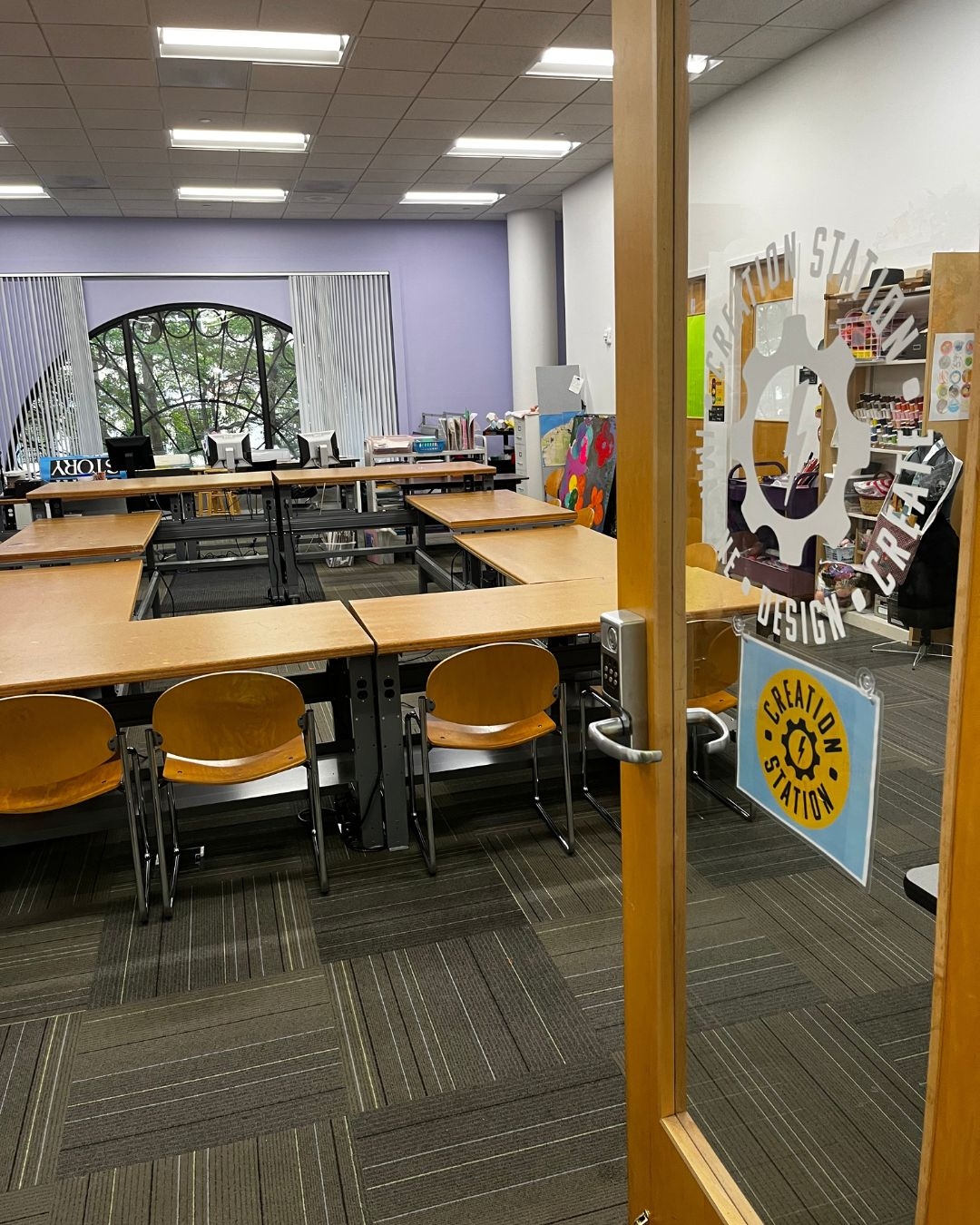
The Creation Station at Selby Library

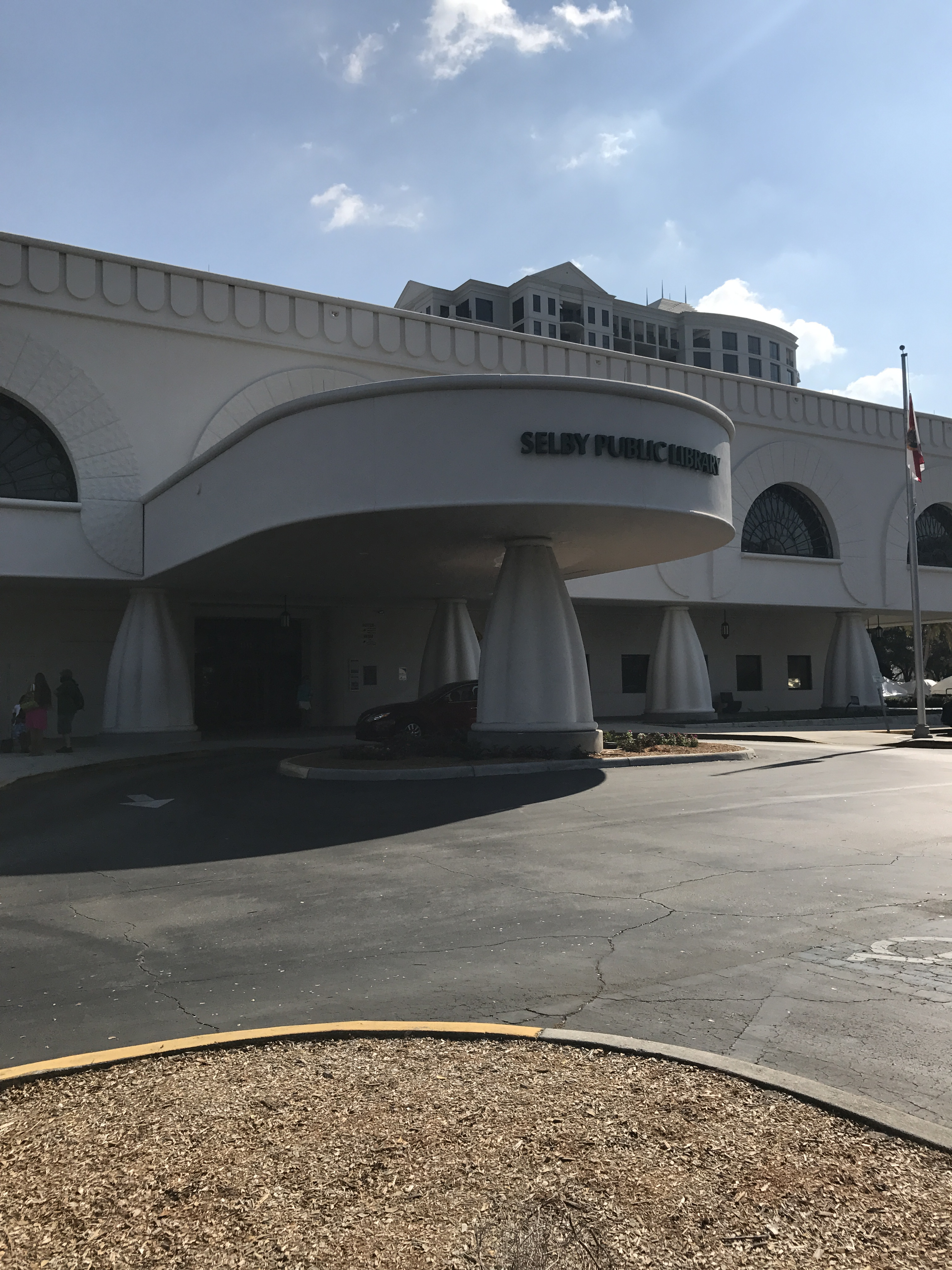
Alternate view of library

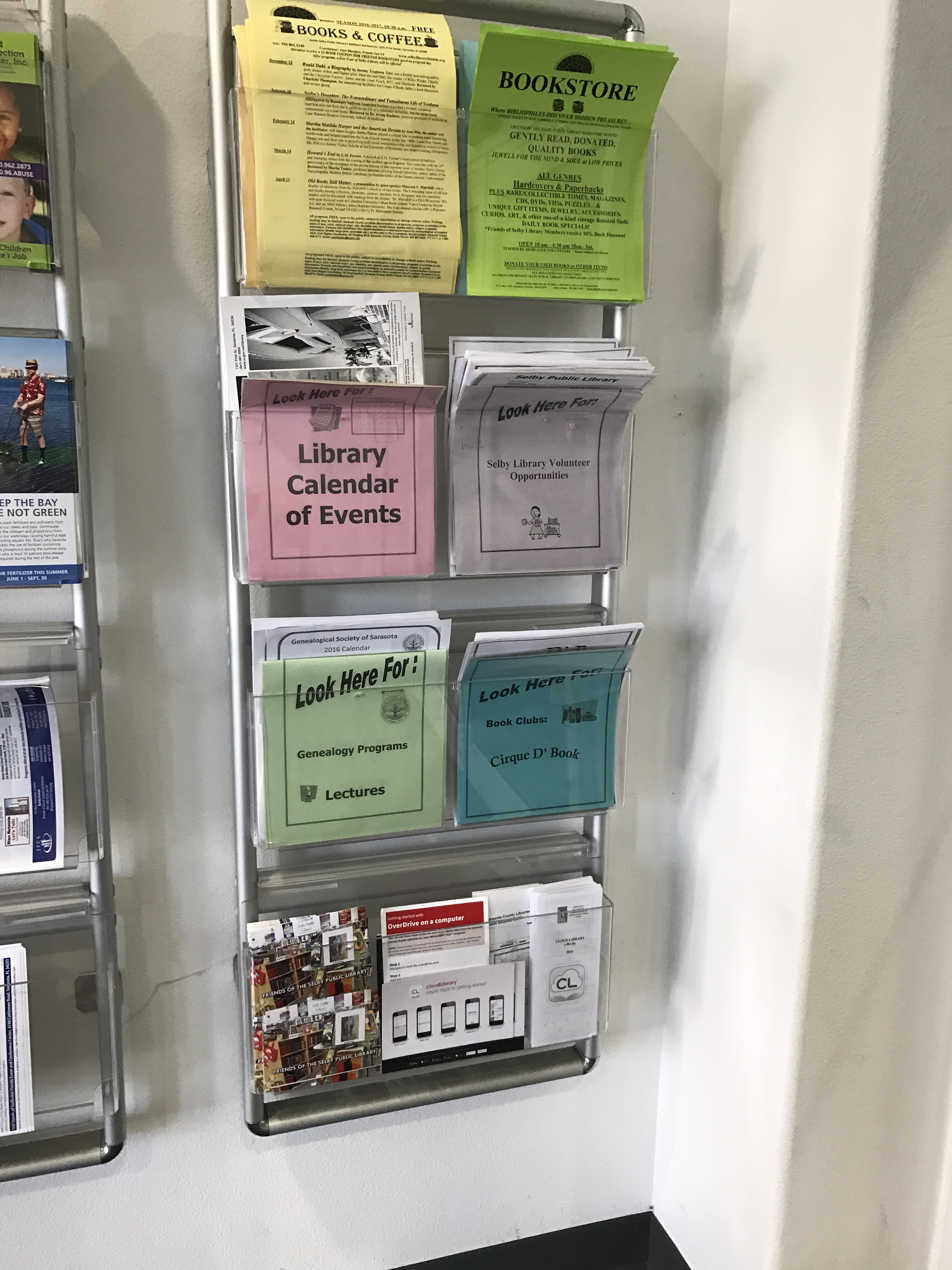
Programs at the library
