= List of historic sites in Sarasota, Florida =

Sarasota, Florida has 71 structures that have been placed on the National Register of Historic Places. Several additional historic buildings have been proposed for listing.

- American National Bank Building
- Appleby Building
- Atlantic Coast Line Passenger Depot
- Bacheller-Brewer Model Home Estate
- Bacon and Tomlin, Inc.
- Bay Haven School
- Bee Ridge Woman's Club
- Bidwell-Wood House
- Frank and Matilda Binz House
- Bispham-Wilson Historic District
- Blalock House
- Bryson-Crane House
- William J. Burns House
- Burns Court Historic District
- Burns Realty Company-Karl Bickel House
- Caples and Ringling Estates Historic District
- Old Caples Hall, Ellen and Ralph Caples residence
- Cà d'Zan, John and Mable Ringling's former residence
- Edith and Charles Ringling residence
- Hester Ringling Landcaster Sanford residence
- Casa Del Mar
- Central-Cocoanut Historic District
- Crocker Church
- City Waterworks
- Corrigan House
- Crisp Building
- F. A. DeCanizares House
- DeMarcay Hotel
- Earle House
- Edwards Theatre
- El Patio Apartments
- El Vernona Apartments-Broadway Apartments
- El Vernona Hotel-John Ringling Hotel
- Field Estate
- Frances-Carlton Apartments
- Dr. Joseph Halton House
- Harding Circle Historic District
- House at 507 Jackson Drive
- Edson Keith Estate
- Frank Guptill house
- Dr. Walter Kennedy House
- S. H. Kress Building
- Hilton Leech House and Amagansett Art School
- Laurel Park Historic District
- Levillain-Letton House
- Maine Colony Historic District
- Municipal Auditorium-Recreation Club
- Out of Door School
- Overtown Historic District
- Christy Payne Mansion
- Capt. W. F. Purdy House
- L.D. Reagin House
- Leonard Reid House
- Rigby's La Plaza Historic District
- John and Mable Ringling Museum of Art
- Rosemary Cemetery
- Roth Cigar Factory
- Sanderling Beach Club
- Sarasota County Courthouse
- Sarasota Herald Building
- Sarasota High School
- Sarasota Times Building
- Sarasota Woman's Club
- George Schueler House
- Seagate
- South Side School
- Southwick-Harmon House
- Thoms House
- U.S. Post Office-Federal Building (Sarasota, Florida)
- J. G. Whitfield Estate
- H. B. William House
- Dr. C. B. Wilson House
- Worth's Block

== See also ==
- National Register of Historic Places listings in Sarasota County, Florida
