= Floridaland =

Coordinates: 27.1779°N 82.4904°W

- Interactive map of Floridaland
- Location: Florida, USA
- Status: Defunct
- Opened: 25 December 1964
- Closed: 2 July 1971

Floridaland was a tourist attraction between Sarasota and Venice, Florida on US highway 41. It opened December 25, 1964 and closed on July 2, 1971. It boasted "Everything Under The Sun!" and "10 Big Attractions for One Low Price." Attractions included a petting zoo, dolphin show, and old west style main street featuring can-can girls performing at the Gold Nugget Saloon, and a gun fight and stunt show that took place several times a day.

== See also ==
- List of historic sites in Sarasota, Florida
- National Register of Historic Places listings in Sarasota County, Florida
- Sarasota Jungle Gardens
- Historic Spanish Point
