= Harmon House =

Harmon House may refer to:

== Places and structures ==
=== United States ===
(by state, then city)

- Celora Stoddard/Lon Harmon House, Phoenix, Arizona, listed on the National Register of Historic Places (NRHP) in Maricopa County
- Harmon–McNeil House, Santa Ana, California, listed on the NRHP in Orange County
- Southwick-Harmon House, Sarasota, Florida, NRHP-listed
- John C. Harmon House, Topeka, Kansas, listed on the NRHP in Shawnee County
- Fitzpatrick–Harmon House, Prestonsburg, Kentucky, listed on the NRHP in Floyd County
- William Harmon House (Miles City, Montana), NRHP-listed
- William Harmon House (Lima, New York), NRHP-listed
- Francis E. Harmon House, Ashtabula, Ohio, listed on the NRHP in Ashtabula County
- Harmon–Neils House, Portland, Oregon, NRHP-listed
- Oliver John Harmon House, Price, Utah, listed on the NRHP in Carbon County
