= Columbus Fireman's Park Complex =

- U.S. National Register of Historic Places
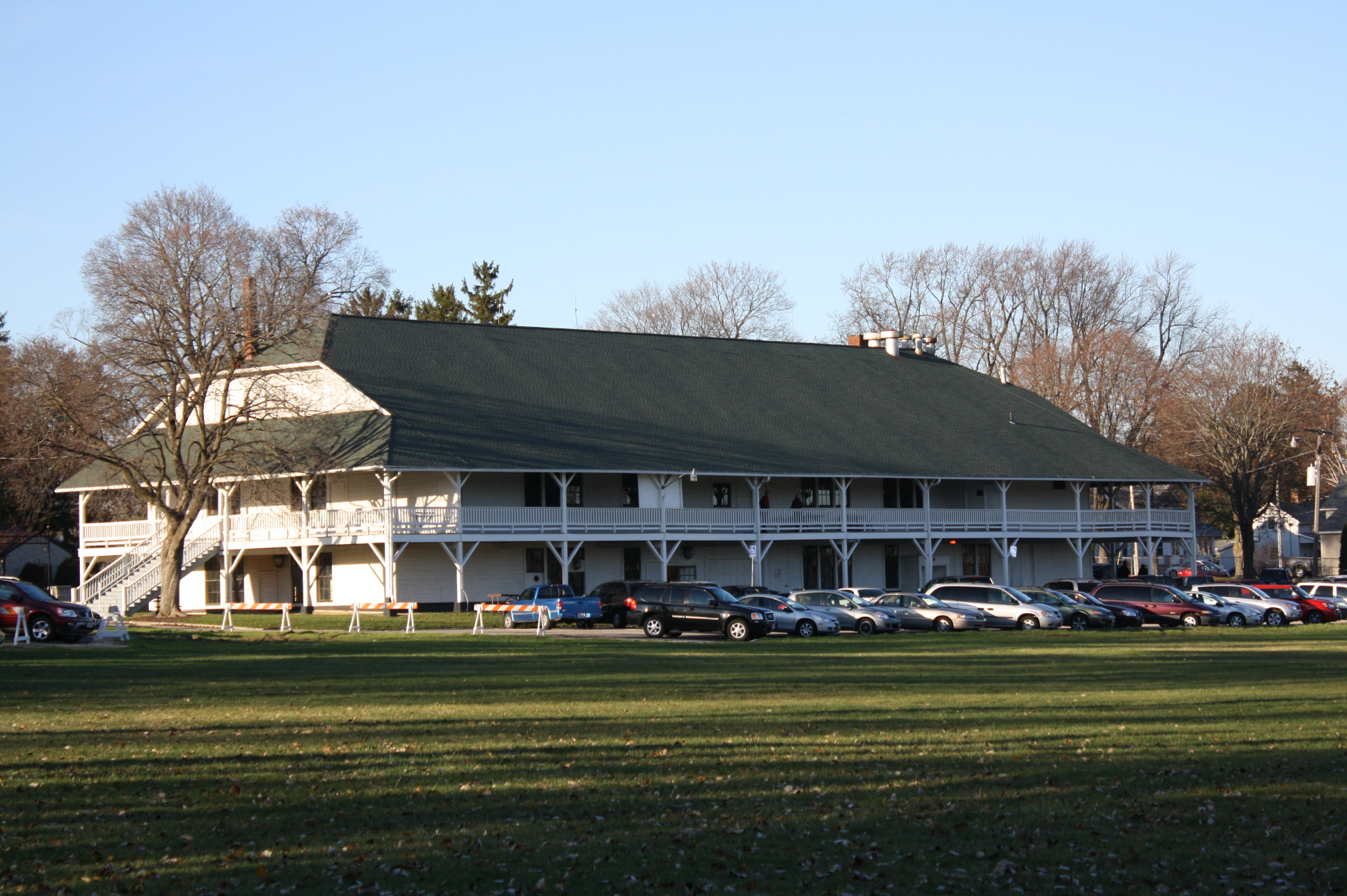
- The Fireman's Park pavilion

- Location within Wisconsin Location within the United States
- Location: 1049 Park Ave., Columbus, Wisconsin
- Coordinates: 43°19′48″N 89°1′24″W
- Area: 8.5 acres (3.4 ha)
- Built: 1917
- Architect: Callahn Bros.; Alfred C. Clas
- Architectural style: Prairie School, Late Victorian
- NRHP reference No.: 04000106
- Added to NRHP: February 25, 2004

The Columbus Fireman's Park Complex consists of the Pavilion, a historic building used for many years and built by hand, the Resthaven, a building people can use a resting place during a journey, the Boys Scout Cabin, and two gates into the complex in Fireman's Park in Columbus, Wisconsin.

Fireman's Park became a Columbus city park in 1915, and the city's fire department developed the park as a community project. The park's Pavilion opened in 1917. While mainly used for community dances, the pavilion has also hosted a variety of other events. Resthaven, a Prairie School structure designed by Alfred C. Clas of Milwaukee, opened in 1923 and has been used for cooking and sanitation by the many auto tourists who visit the park. The west wall and gate of the park were built in 1917 and are also part of the historic site.

The park buildings were added to the National Register of Historic Places on February 25, 2004.

== Images ==
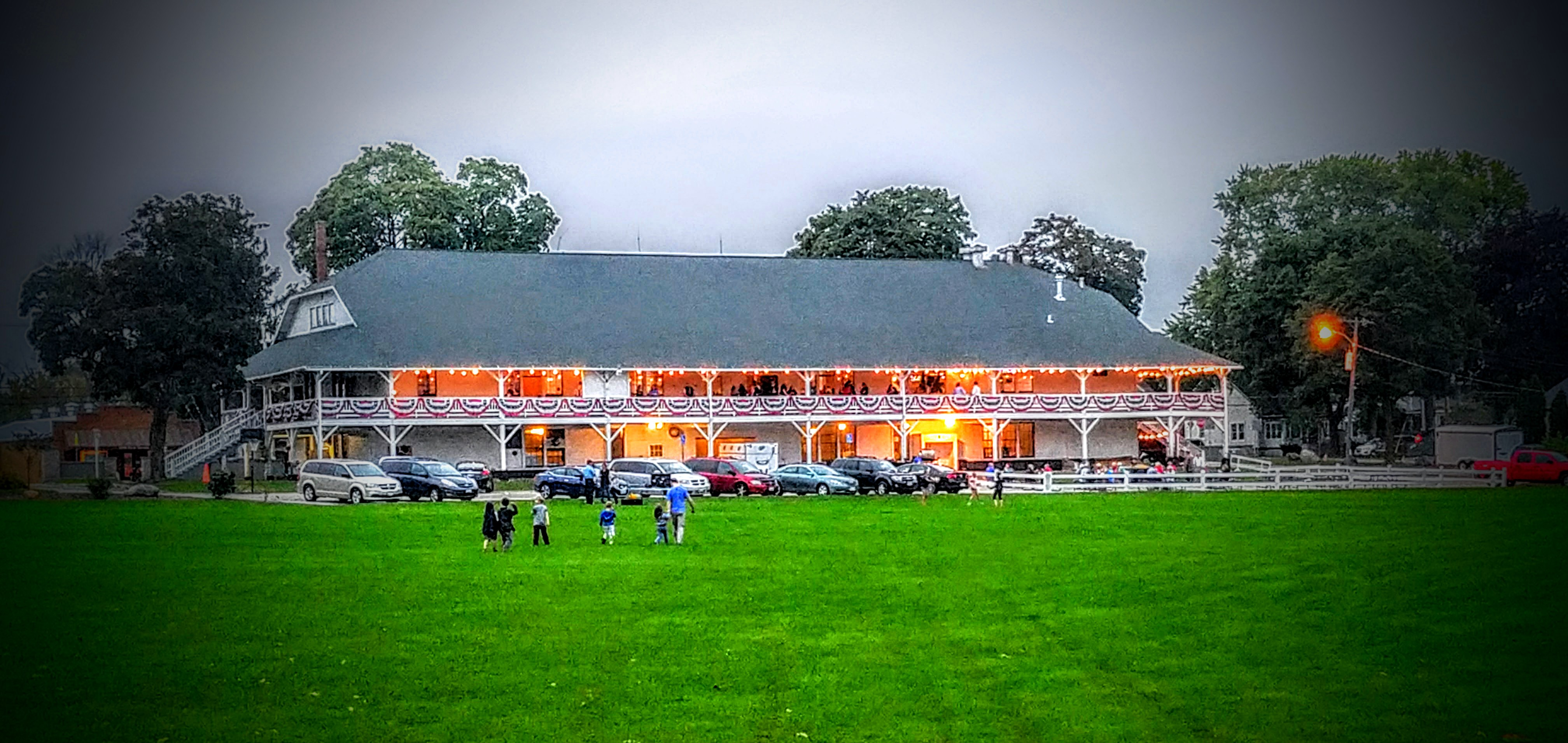

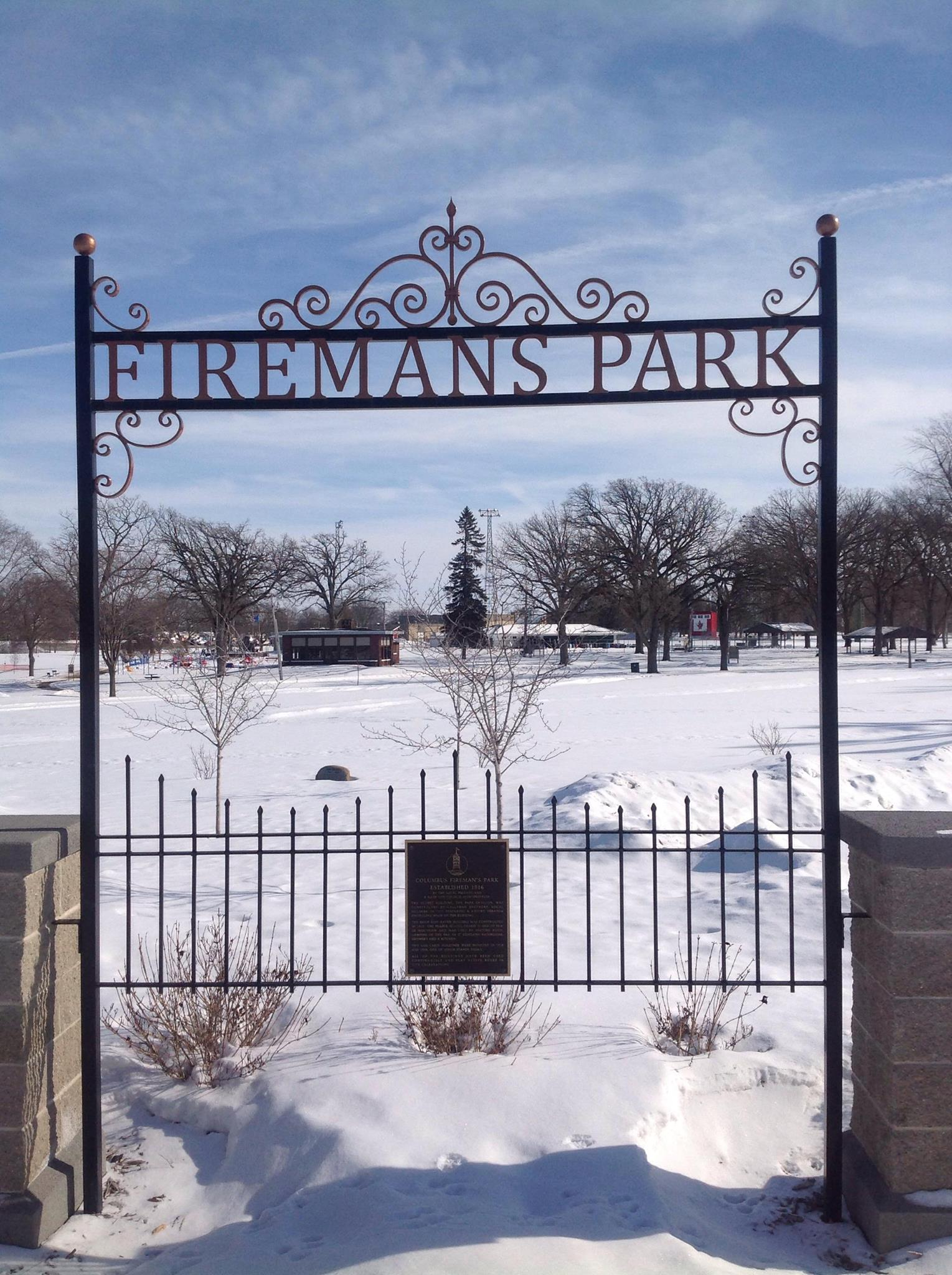
Sign in winter

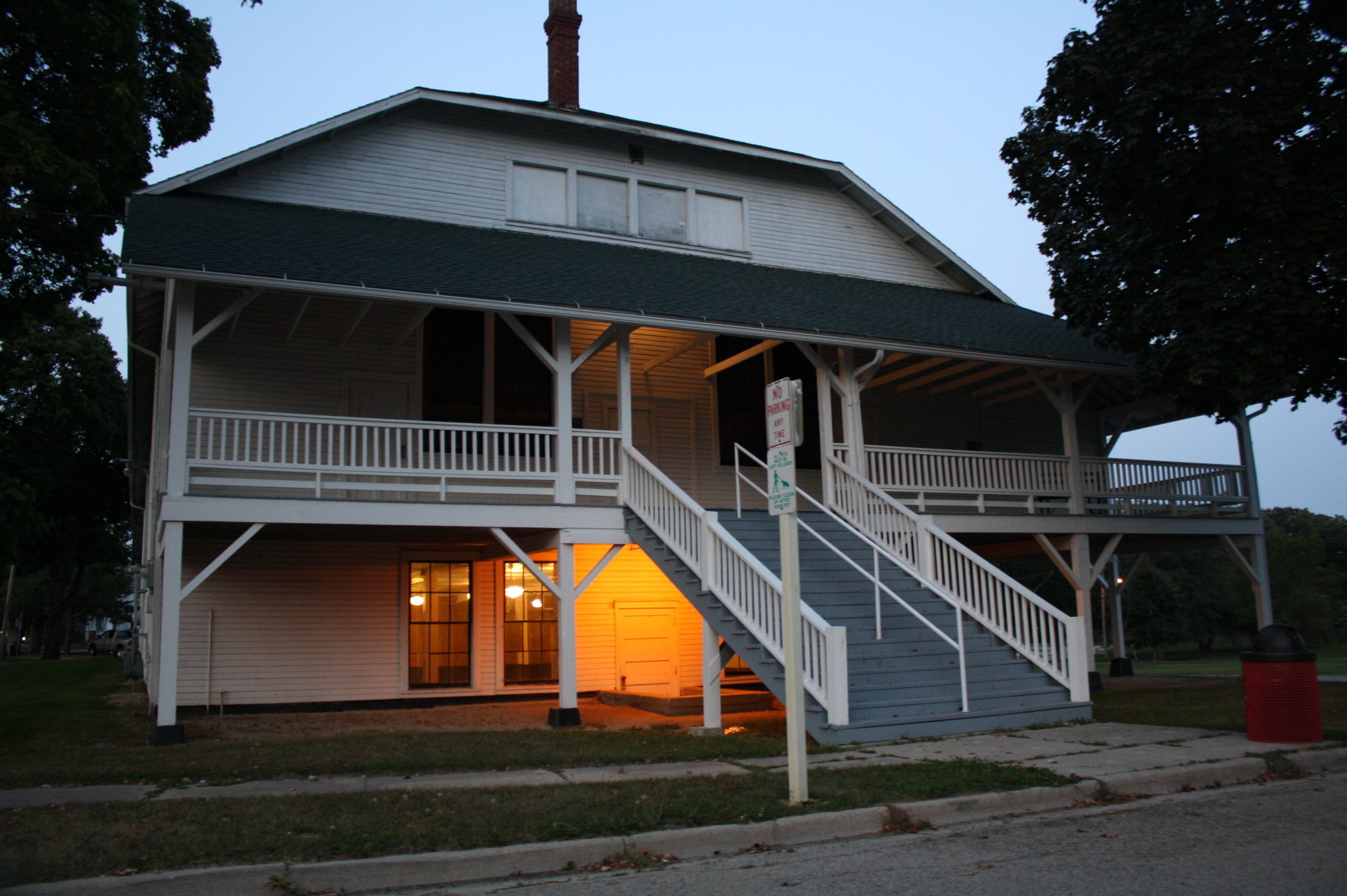
Main building after sunset

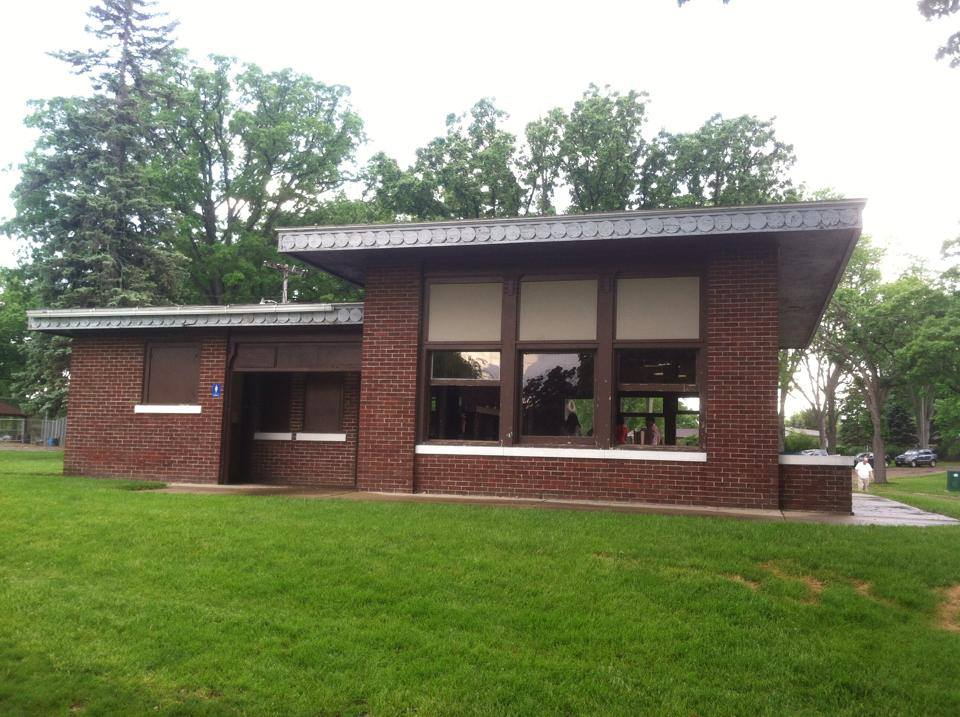
Resthaven
