= Meyer J. Sturm =

American architect

Meyer J. Sturm was an American architect who designed hospitals and wrote about their design. He designed the main portion of the Milwaukee Hospital at 2200 W. Kilbourn Avenue in Milwaukee, Wisconsin, a property listed on the National register of Historic Places. He also designed North Chicago Hospital, a Chicago Landmark. With Albert J. Ochsner he wrote The Organization, Construction and Management of Hospitals. which went into 2nd edition

He designed his own home. His sister Celia Sturm was an interior decorator. His wife's father was Edward S. Goulston, a prominent Boston businessman. His wife's brother was Leopold Goulston, a Boston attorney. He died in 1954.

== Buildings ==
- Milwaukee Hospital, main portion
- North Chicago Hospital, a Chicago Landmark
- His home

== Writings ==
- The Organization, Construction and Management of Hospitals, co-author
