= Midsummer Carnival Shaft =

Artwork by Alfred C. Clas

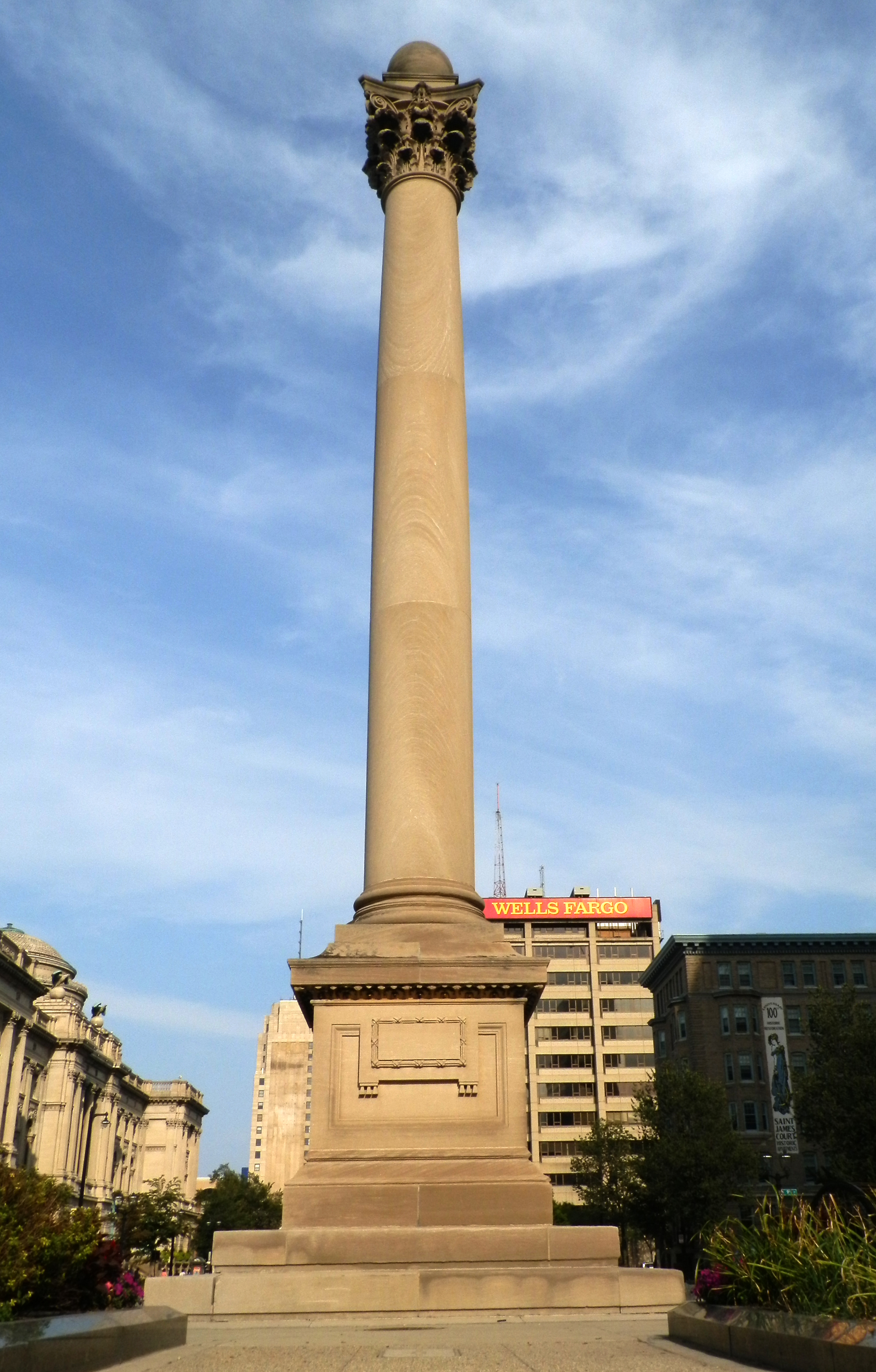
- Artist: Alfred C. Clas
- Year: 1900
- Type: Bedford Limestone
- Dimensions: (65 feet (20 m) ft)
- Location: W. Wisconsin Ave. between N. 8th and N. 11th St., Milwaukee; 43°2′19.546″N 87°55′25.984″W
- Owner: City of Milwaukee (Administrator)

Midsummer Carnival Shaft is a public artwork by American architect Alfred C. Clas in the Court of Honor, in downtown Milwaukee, Wisconsin, United States. It is on Wisconsin Avenue, between N. 8th and N. 11th Streets.

== Description ==
The Midsummer Carnival Shaft was commissioned by the City of Milwaukee, which chose Alfred C. Clas as the artist to design/construct it. It was built as part of the Milwaukee Midsummer Carnival, an annual festival started in 1898 to honor Wisconsin's semicentennial, but which only lasted until 1901.

The sculpture is constructed from Bedford limestone. It consists of one pillar that stands 65 feet (20 m) in the median of Wisconsin Avenue. The sculpture stands nearly as tall as the surrounding buildings, and invites viewers to take notice of it as they pass by, rather than being viewed for long periods of time.

== Artist ==
Alfred C. Clas was born in Sauk City, Wisconsin in 1860. As Clas was a local architect and city planner at the time, he was a good choice to create the publicly-located sculpture. Clas was also a partner of a local architecture firm Ferry & Clas. The two architects were responsible for much of the city planning and development that was happening at the time. Clas was a member of City Park Board, and designed the Milwaukee Auditorium and other public buildings.

The City of Milwaukee commemorated a park in Clas's name in appreciation of his work as a city planner. Alfred C. Clas Park is located in Milwaukee County, just off N. 9th St and Wells St (Latitude: 43.0405556, Longitude: -87.9238889).

Short video of the Carnival Column and surrounding monuments.
