= Hutchinson Memorial Library =

- U.S. National Register of Historic Places
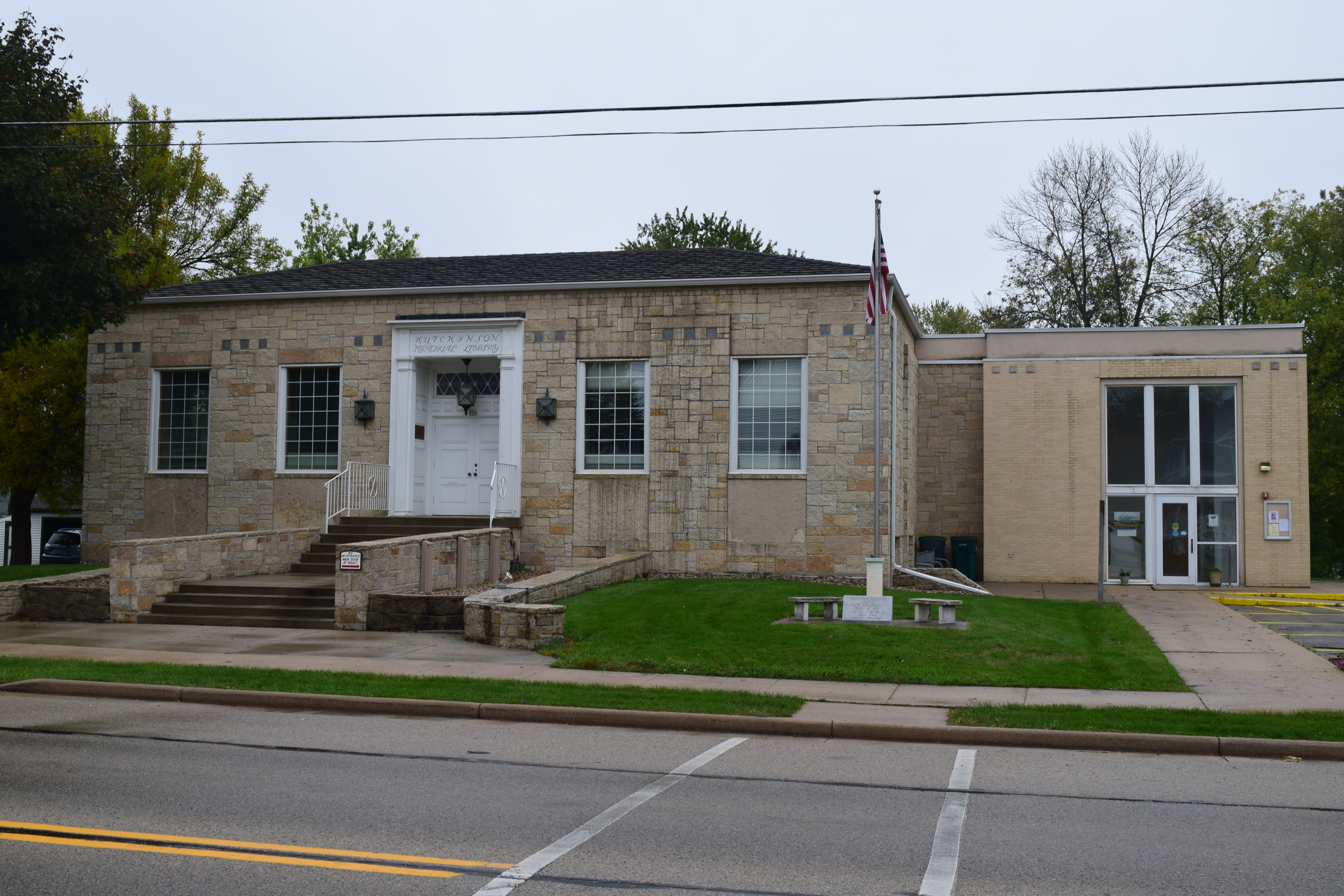
- Hutchinson Memorial Library
- Location: 228 N. High St., Randolph, Wisconsin
- Coordinates: 43°32′23″N 89°00′23″W
- Area: less than one acre
- Built: 1936
- Architect: Clas & Clas, Inc.
- Architectural style: Moderne
- MPS: Public Library Facilities of Wisconsin MPS
- NRHP reference No.: 90001705
- Added to NRHP: November 15, 1990

The Hutchinson Memorial Library is a public library at 228 N. High Street in Randolph, Wisconsin, USA.

== History ==
Randolph had had a circulating library, hosted by several local stores, which had over 3,000 books before the permanent library was completed. The library was built in 1936 using funds and land from the estate of Mary L. Morris. The architecture firm Clas & Clas, founded by the prominent Milwaukee architect Alfred Clas, designed the library in the Classical Moderne style which was popular during the Great Depression, particularly in buildings funded by New Deal programs.

The one-story library's design includes an ashlar limestone exterior, a classical entrance with pilasters and an entablature, a course of grouped square metal tiles, large spandrels beneath the sash windows and a hip roof.

The library was added to the National Register of Historic Places on November 15, 1990. It is still in use as Randolph's public library.
