= Milwaukee Hospital =

- U.S. National Register of Historic Places
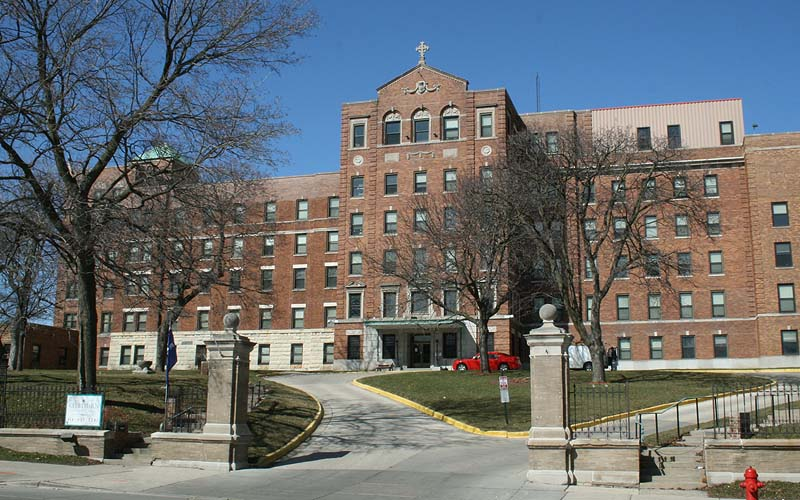
- Milwaukee Hospital
- Location: 2200 W. Kilbourn Ave. Milwaukee, Wisconsin
- Coordinates: 43.04225°N 87.94063°W
- Built by: Casper Hennecke (fence)
- Architect: Meyer J. Sturm (1912 Surgery Annex); Clas, Shepard & Clas (1925-26 West Wing); Clas & Clas (1941 maternity wing)
- Architectural style: Modern Movement
- NRHP reference No.: 06000800
- Added to NRHP: September 6, 2006

The Milwaukee Hospital in Milwaukee, Wisconsin, United States, was a leader in antiseptic surgery when its surgery rooms opened in 1912, and was also a leader in using x-rays in medicine, having in 1926 the most powerful x-ray machine in the U.S. The complex was added to the National Register of Historic Places in 2006.

== History ==
The hospital was established by the Lutheran clergyman William Passavant in 1863, housed in a former farm house. Passavant is now recognized as a saint by the Lutheran Church and the Episcopal Church. In 1884 the hospital built a new building designed specifically for patient care. Dr. Nicholas Senn was on staff from 1879, internationally recognized for his use of antiseptic procedures to explore the pancreas and intestines. (The germ theory of disease was just being adopted then.)

In the early 1900s, Rev. Herman Fritschel, the Director and Rector of the Milwaukee Hospital, began to greatly expand the hospital, culminating in building the Surgical Annex in 1912. This 5-story building, designed by Meyer J. Sturm of Chicago, is the oldest surviving part of the complex. The 6-story West Wing was added in 1925-26, designed by Clas, Shepard & Clas of Milwaukee. The Central Wing was added in 1931, replacing the 1884 hospital. The Maternity Pavilion was added in 1941, designed by Clas & Clas. The Senn Win was added in 1951-52, designed by Redemann & Clas. The four-story Lutheran Deaconess Home was rebuilt in 1956. The Hennekemper Wing was added in 1958, the East Wing in 1969, and the East Pavilion in 1980.

Its original enclosing iron fence atop a rough cut Waukesha blue stone wall dates from 1903, with the wrought produced by German immigrant Casper Hennecke and marked "C. Hennecke Co. Iron & Wire Works, Milwaukee, Wis". The fence along State St. is different, later.
