= Emanuel D. Adler House =

Historic house in Wisconsin, United States

- U.S. National Register of Historic Places
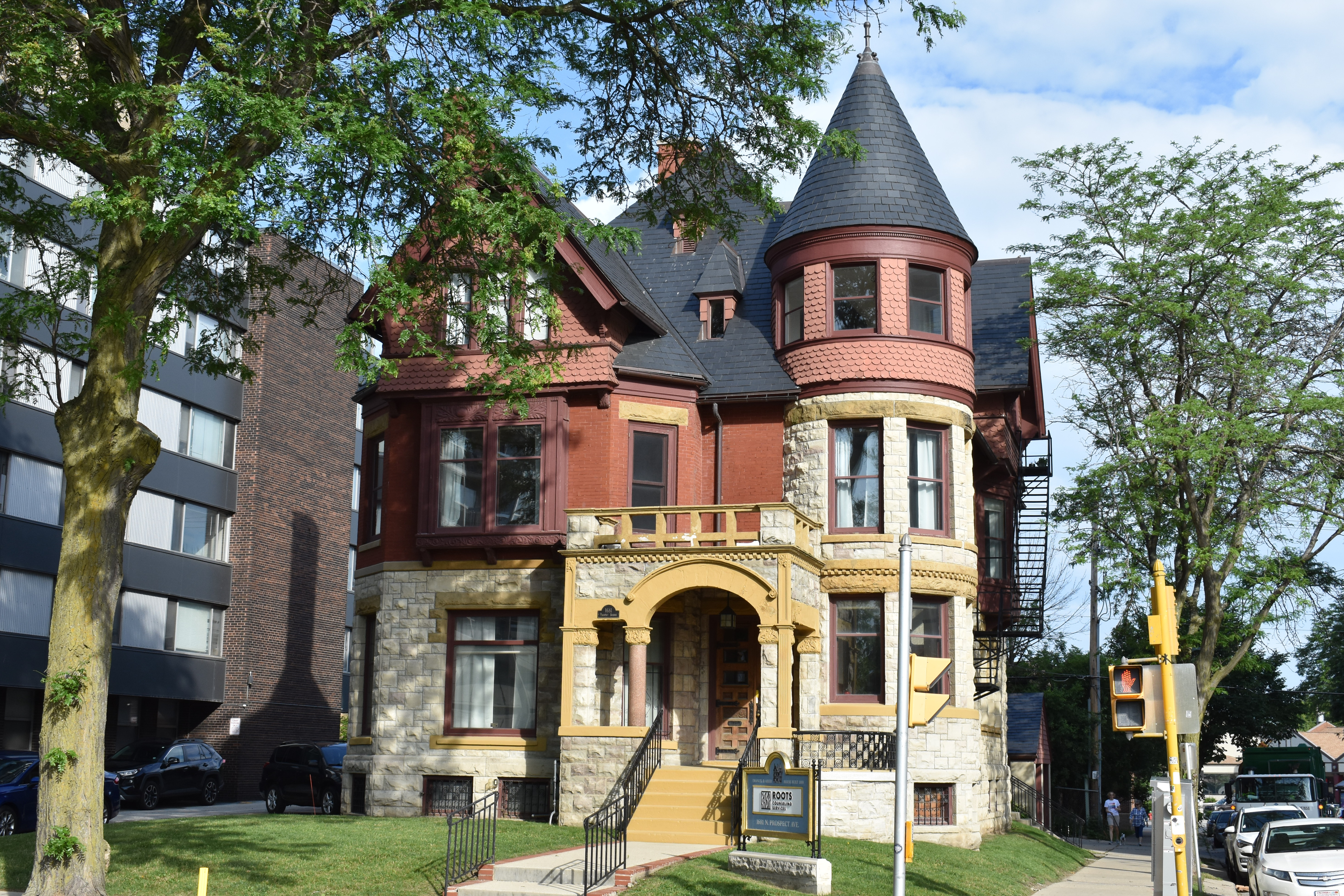
- Emanuel D. Adler House

- Location within Wisconsin Location within the United States
- Location: 1681 N. Prospect Ave., Milwaukee, Wisconsin
- Coordinates: 43.05242°N 87.89164°W
- Area: less than one acre
- Architect: Alfred Clas/Fred Werner
- Architectural style: Queen Anne/Romanesque Revival
- NRHP reference No.: 91001397
- Added to NRHP: September 13, 1991

The Emanuel D. Adler House is a historic residence at 1681 North Prospect Avenue in Milwaukee, Wisconsin. It was built in 1888 for Emanuel D. Adler, a successful clothing manufacturer. The house was designed by Milwaukee architect Alfred Clas.

The house was added to the State and the National Register of Historic Places in 1991.

== History ==
Emanuel D. Adler's father, David Adler, ran a large clothing manufacture and wholesale company in Milwaukee. The company was founded by David's brother Solomon, and several other members of the Adler family, including Emanuel, were part of the business's operations. The business was quite profitable during the 1880s, and when Emanuel married Clara H. Schloss in 1888, the couple was able to afford a new house in the well-off Prospect Avenue neighborhood. The plot of land on which the house was built came from a parcel of land speculator Joseph B. Oliver's holdings; Clara's father Seligman bought it for the couple as a wedding present. Emanual Adler became president of the family clothing business in 1925, though he liquidated it in 1929 and retired the following year. After his death in 1936, his home became a boarding house.

== Architecture ==
Milwaukee architect Alfred Clas designed the house; it is one of the few buildings he designed alone before establishing the Ferry & Clas firm. Clas gave the house a Queen Anne design with some Romanesque Revival elements. The two-and-a-half story house has a tower with a cone-shaped roof at one corner. Its projecting front porch has an arched entry and a balcony atop its roof; the porch, as well as the entire first floor and the tower's second floor, has a rough limestone exterior. The rest of the second floor is faced with brick, while the half-story is decorated with fishscale-shaped terra cotta tiles. The roof has a complex form with a gable end on each side.
