= Alfred Clas =

American architect (1859–1942)

Alfred Charles Clas (1859–1942) was an architect in Milwaukee, Wisconsin. Born in Sauk City, Wisconsin, he moved to California in 1879 and worked briefly at an architectural firm before returning to Wisconsin and working as a draftsman with James Douglas. He advanced to a partnership with Douglas in 1885–86 and then worked independently for a few years prior to creating the firm Ferry & Clas with George Bowman Ferry in 1890. The Pabst Mansion at 2000 West Wisconsin Avenue in Milwaukee was the first project of the Ferry & Clas partnership and was completed in 1892.

Ferry and Clas were responsible for much of the city planning and development that was happening at the time. Clas was a City Planner and a member of City Park Board and designed the Milwaukee Auditorium and other public buildings. Ferry & Clas was dissolved in 1912, when Clas partnered with his son Angelo to form the firm Clas & Clas. In 1921 that partnership was restructured as Clas, Shepard & Clas by the addition of his son Reuben and John S. Shepard as junior partners. Shepard withdrew in 1931 and the firm became Clas & Clas, Inc., with Alfred Clas remaining president until his death in 1942.

The City of Milwaukee commemorated a park in Clas's name in appreciation of his work as a city planner. Alfred C. Clas Park is located in Milwaukee County, just off N. 9th St and Wells St (Latitude: 43.0405556, Longitude: -87.9238889), on the southern side of the Milwaukee County Courthouse.

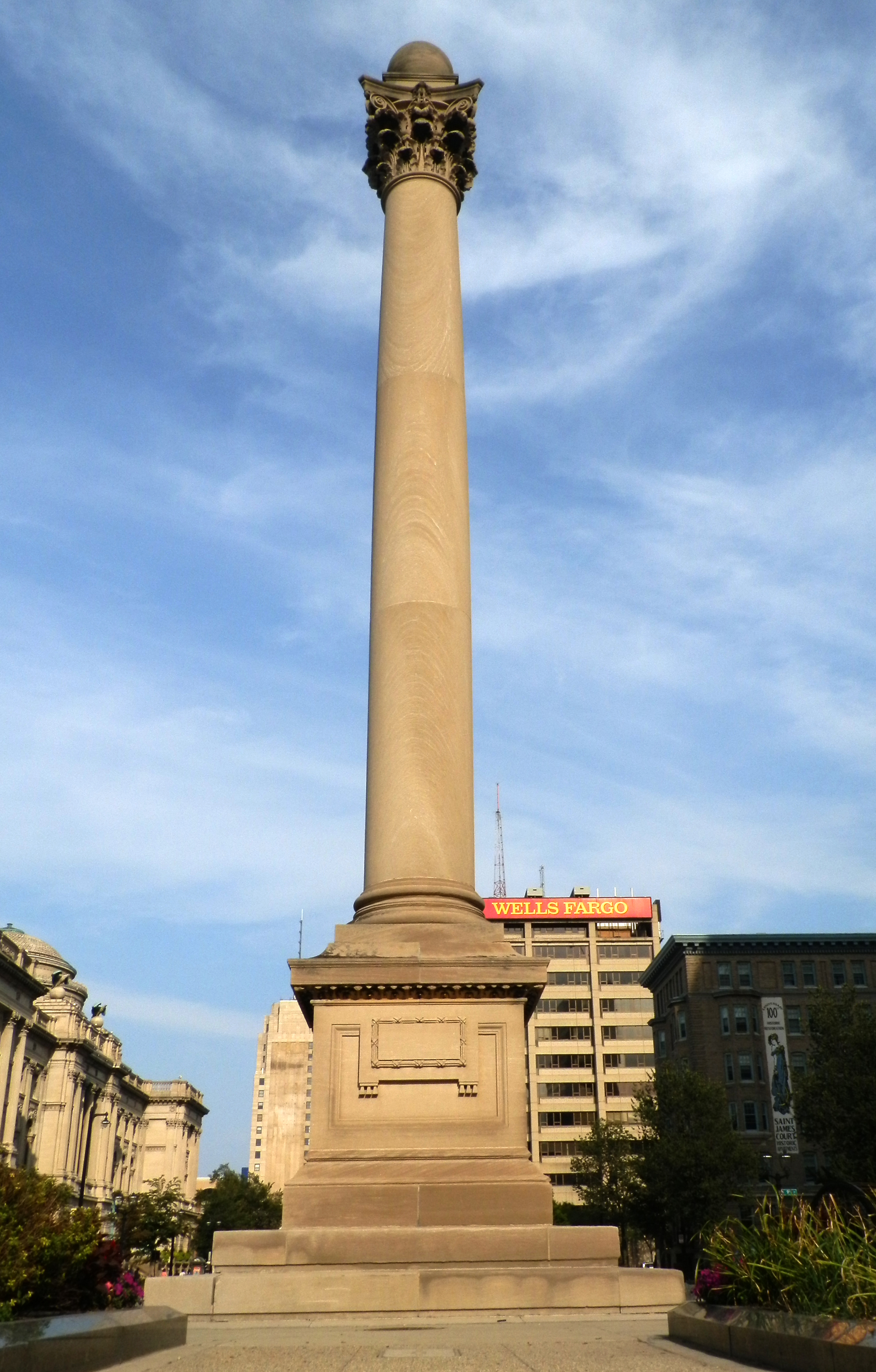
Midsummer Carnival Shaft at the Court of Honor in downtown Milwaukee, Wisconsin

Short video of the Carnival Column and surrounding monuments

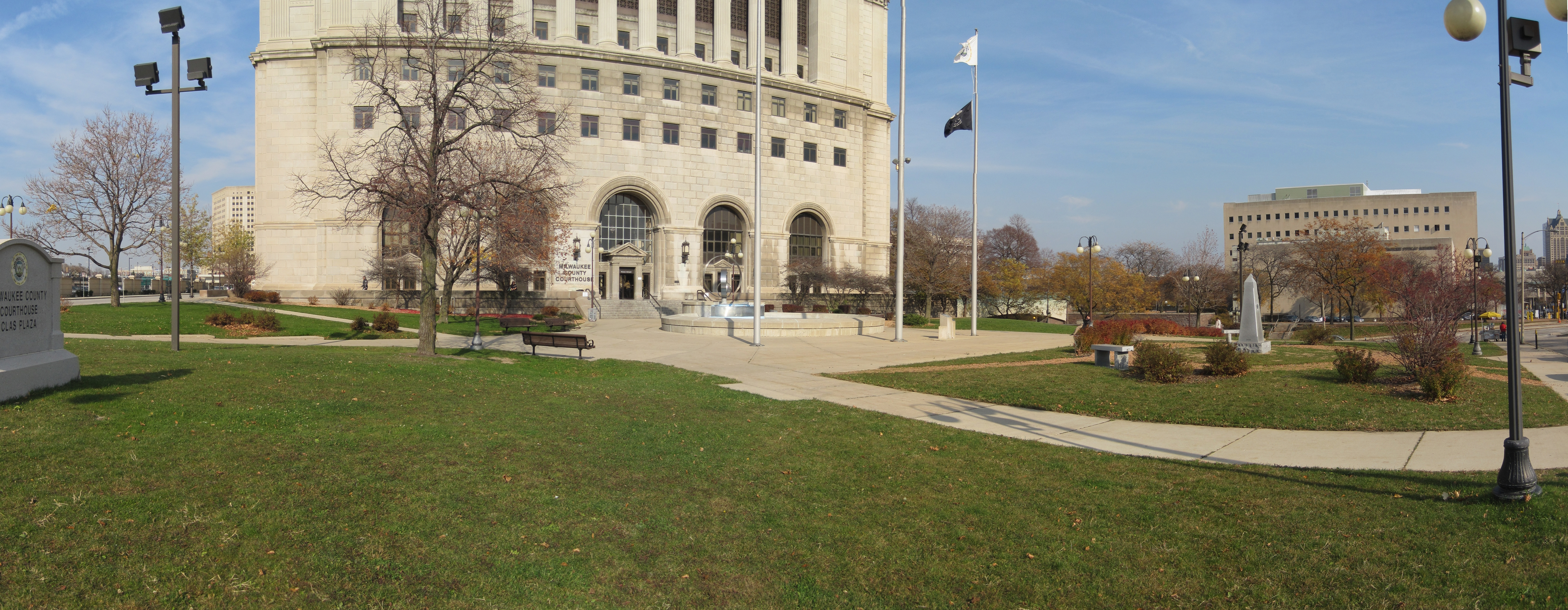
Clas Park at the Milwaukee County Courthouse

He was a member of the American Institute of Architects.

In 1912 Clas' "A Scheme for the Improvement of the Milwaukee River" was published. His speech "Civic Improvement in Milwaukee, Wisconsin; An Address Delivered before the Greater Milwaukee Association, December 14, 1916", was also published.

The Milwaukee Public Library has a portrait of Clas.

== Works ==
For works by the 1890–1912 partnership with George Ferry, see Ferry & Clas

- Freethinkers' Hall (1884) at 309 Polk Street, Sauk City, Wisconsin NRHP-listed
- Bernard Joseph Eiring House (1888) at 2825 West Kilbourn Avenue, Milwaukee
- Emanuel and Clara Adler House (1888), 1681 N. Prospect Avenue, Milwaukee. Also known as Emanuel D. Adler House. NRHP-listed
- Sauk City High School (1916) at 713 Madison Street, Sauk City, Wisconsin NRHP-listed
- Alfred C. Clas Home (1921) at 2348 N. Terrace Avenue in Milwaukee (his house in retirement)
- Hotel Whiting (1923) at 1408 Strongs Avenue in Stevens Point, Wisconsin. Now the Whiting Place Apartments
- Resthaven (1923) in the Columbus Fireman's Park at 1049 Park Avenue in Columbus, Wisconsin. NRHP-listed
- Earle House (1924) at 4521 Bayshore Road in Sarasota, Florida. (Clas, Shepard & Clas) NRHP-listed
- West Wing of Milwaukee Hospital (1925–26) at 2200 W. Kilbourn Avenue in Milwaukee, Wisconsin (Clas, Shepard & Clas) NRHP-listed
- Crisp Building (1926) at 1970 Main Street in Sarasota, Florida. (Clas, Shepard & Clas) NRHP-listed
- Tripoli Temple (1928) in Milwaukee, Wisconsin (Clas, Shepard & Clas) NRHP-listed
- Hutchinson Memorial Library (1936) at 228 N. High Street in Randolph, Wisconsin (Clas & Clas) NRHP-listed
