= Crocker Church =

Church building

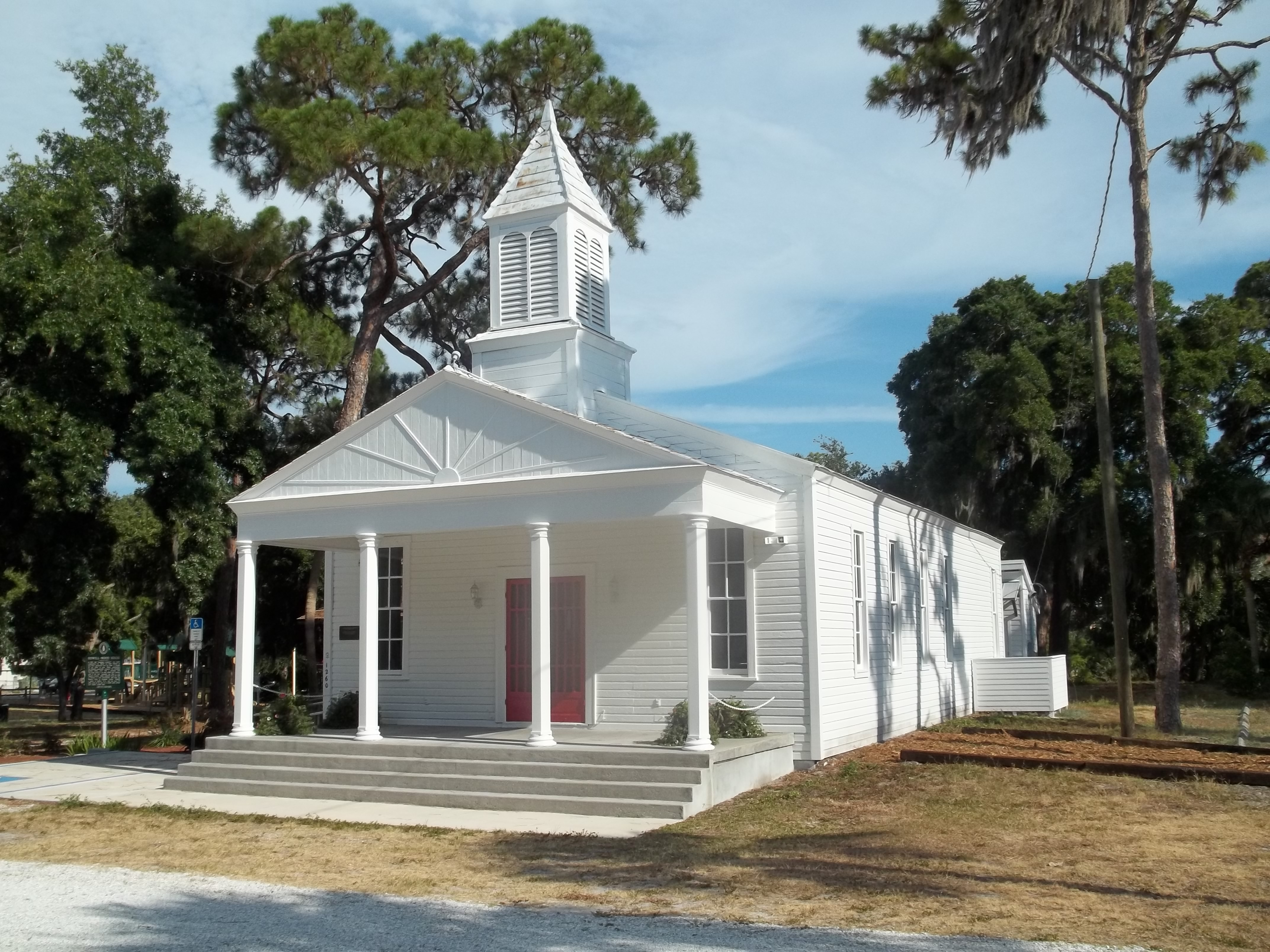
- Crocker Church pictured in 2011.
- Crocker Church
- 27.348464°N 82.545706°W
- Address: 1260 12th Street, Sarasota, Florida
- Country: United States
- Denomination: Baptist (prior)
- Website: hsosc.com

History
- Former name: St. John's Chapel

Architecture
- Completed: 1901
- Closed: 2004

Crocker Church, also known as St. John's Chapel, was a Baptist church located in Sarasota, Florida. It was established in 1901 by Peter Crocker. It is now a historic structure owned by the Historical Society of Sarasota County and is located at 1260 12th Street, Sarasota, Florida.

== History ==
Peter Crocker, T.T. Hamlin, and L.C. Demings were the three original trustees of St. John's Church. They were deeded the 2 acres of land from the Florida Mortgage and Investment Company on June 27, 1901, for $1. The property was meant to be used for a church and a graveyard. The church was designated as a Baptist chapel in 1903. Due to the failure to find a resident pastor, the church declined after Crocker's death in 1911.

=== Location and ownership changes ===
Sixteen years after Crocker's death, Bay Haven Baptist Church purchased the building and moved it to its property on Bradenton Road. When Bay Haven purchased a new building, a Spanish mission congregation utilized it until the early 1980s. When they left, the church was moved again by the historic preservationists in 1986 to Florida Avenue and was historically designated in 1995. The church continued to be used by Throne of Grace Charismatic Episcopal Church until 2004 when it was officially decommissioned due to its poor condition. In 2005, a campaign began to save the building from demolition. With the help of the county, Jane Kirschner, former president of the historical society, took ownership of the building and coordinated the church's final move to Pioneer Park in 2006. The county provided over $160,000 to move the church for the historical society. It now is used as their gathering place for educational and social events.

=== Historical society ownership ===
Since 2006, the Historical Society has worked to restore, maintain, and utilize Crocker Church. In 2019 and 2020, they raised $50,000 to perform necessary restorations. Repairs were made to the wood siding, floor joists, west wall, foundation and six windows. They are raising funds to restore the east wall. The church is frequently used for events such as Conversations at the Crocker, where experts and audience discuss events and people that have shaped Sarasota. The Historical Society also rents out the church as a wedding venue.

== Cemetery ==
Crocker Cemetery, also known as St John's Cemetery, is historically associated with the church and is located on Bee Ridge Road near the corner of Tamiami Trail. The land for the cemetery was deeded to the church trustees in 1901, and the first burial took place in 1907. Burials continued until 1975, after the church was moved to Bradenton; the graveyard was closed to further burials in 1982.

Around 1997, trustees appointed a new coordinator to restore the cemetery, which had fallen into disrepair. In 2001, a plaque was erected on the site by the Sarasota Historical Commission.
