= Rigby's La Plaza Historic District =

Historic district in Florida, United States

- U.S. National Register of Historic Places
- U.S. Historic district
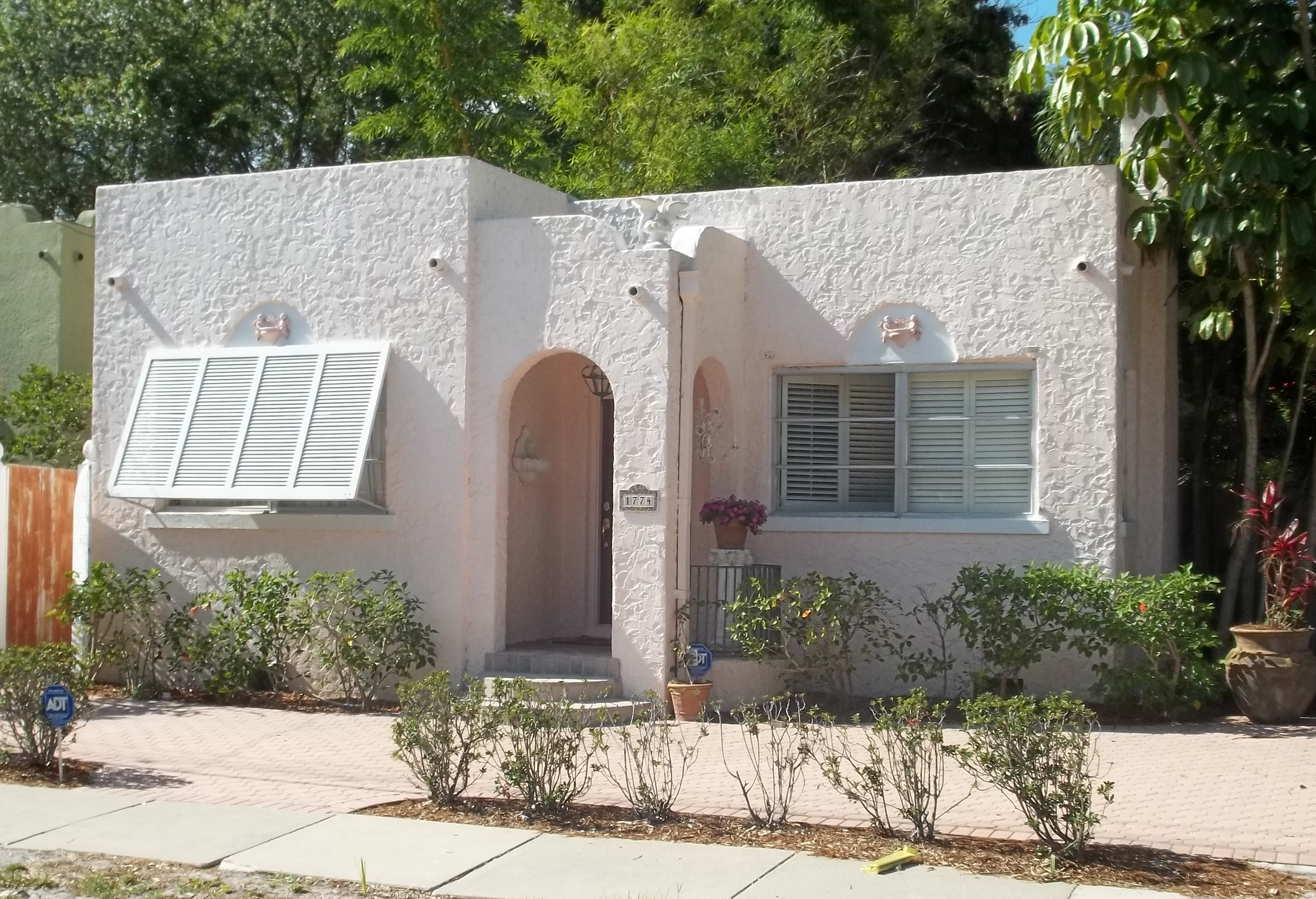

- Location within Florida Location within the United States
- Location: Sarasota, Florida
- Coordinates: 27°19′27″N 82°32′4″W
- Area: 30 acres (0.12 km^{2})
- Architectural style: Mission/Spanish Revival
- NRHP reference No.: 94000373
- Added to NRHP: April 25, 1994

Rigby's La Plaza Historic District is a U.S. historic district (designated as such on April 25, 1994) located in Sarasota, Florida. The district runs from 1002 through 1038 South Osprey Avenue, 1744 and 1776 Alta Vista Street and 1777 Irving Avenue. It contains 8 historic buildings and 2 objects.
