= Maine Colony Historic District =

Historic district in Florida, United States

The Maine Colony Historic District is a U.S. historic district (designated as such on October 5, 2005) located in Sarasota, Florida. The district is bounded by Swift Road, Ashton Road, Portland Way and Grafton Street. https://lh3.googleusercontent.com/p/AF1QipO7GuDDOn6tXkJb3iF_OrN7bTO1E7FpnJhHdl3L=s520-w520-h416-n-k-no
