= Earle House (Sarasota, Florida) =

Historic house in Florida, United States

- U.S. National Register of Historic Places
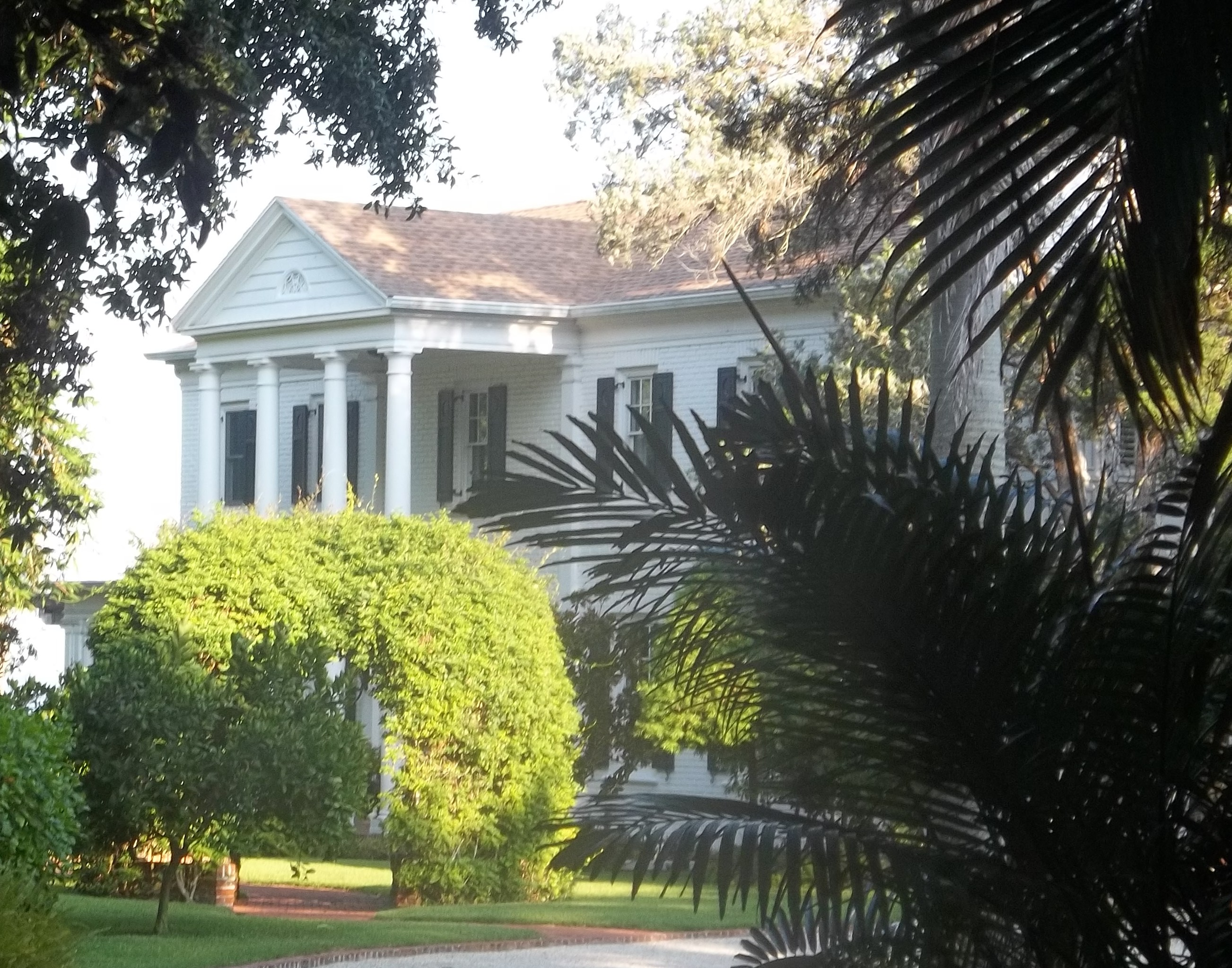
- (2011)

- Location within Florida
- Location: Sarasota, Florida
- Coordinates: 27°22′24″N 82°33′44″W
- Area: 1.8 acres (0.73 ha)
- Built: 1924
- Architect: Alfred C. Clas
- Architectural style: Colonial Revival
- NRHP reference No.: 93000908
- Added to NRHP: September 2, 1993

The Earle House is a historic house located at 4521 Bayshore Road in Sarasota, Florida. The 2 1/2-story house was designed by Milwaukee based architect Alfred Clas's firm Clas, Shepard & Clas in the Colonial Revival style, and was completed in 1924. The firm had an office in Sarasota. The home was added to the National Register of Historic Places on September 2, 1993.

The property is at 4521 Bayshore Road in the Indian Beach Subdivision.
