= Bispham–Wilson Historic District =

Historic district in Florida, United States

- U.S. National Register of Historic Places
- U.S. Historic district
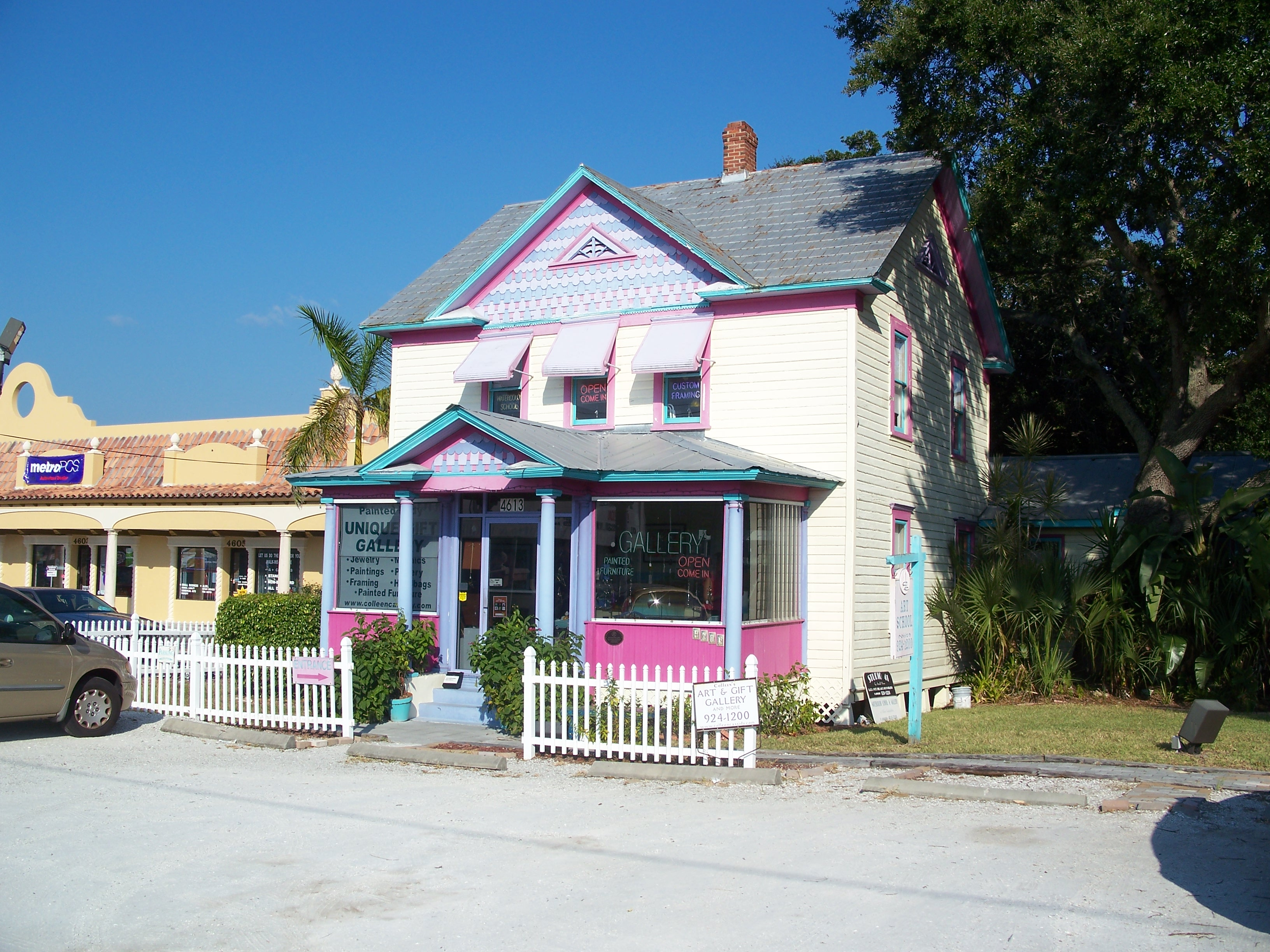

- Location within Florida Location within the United States
- Location: Sarasota, Florida
- Coordinates: 27°17′10″N 82°31′54″W
- Area: less than 1-acre (4,000 m^{2})
- NRHP reference No.: 02001010
- Added to NRHP: September 14, 2002

The Bispham–Wilson Historic District (also known as the Jackson F. Bispham House) is a U.S. historic district (designated as such on September 14, 2002) located in Sarasota, Florida. The district is at 4613 South Tamiami Trail. It contains 3 historic buildings. The property was privately owned and sold. The buildings (the house was the last residential building, occupied until recently, standing on US Route 41 in Sarasota) were torn down Friday, April 3, 2015, to make way for commercial development.
