= House at 507 Jackson Drive =

Historic house in Florida, United States

- U.S. National Register of Historic Places
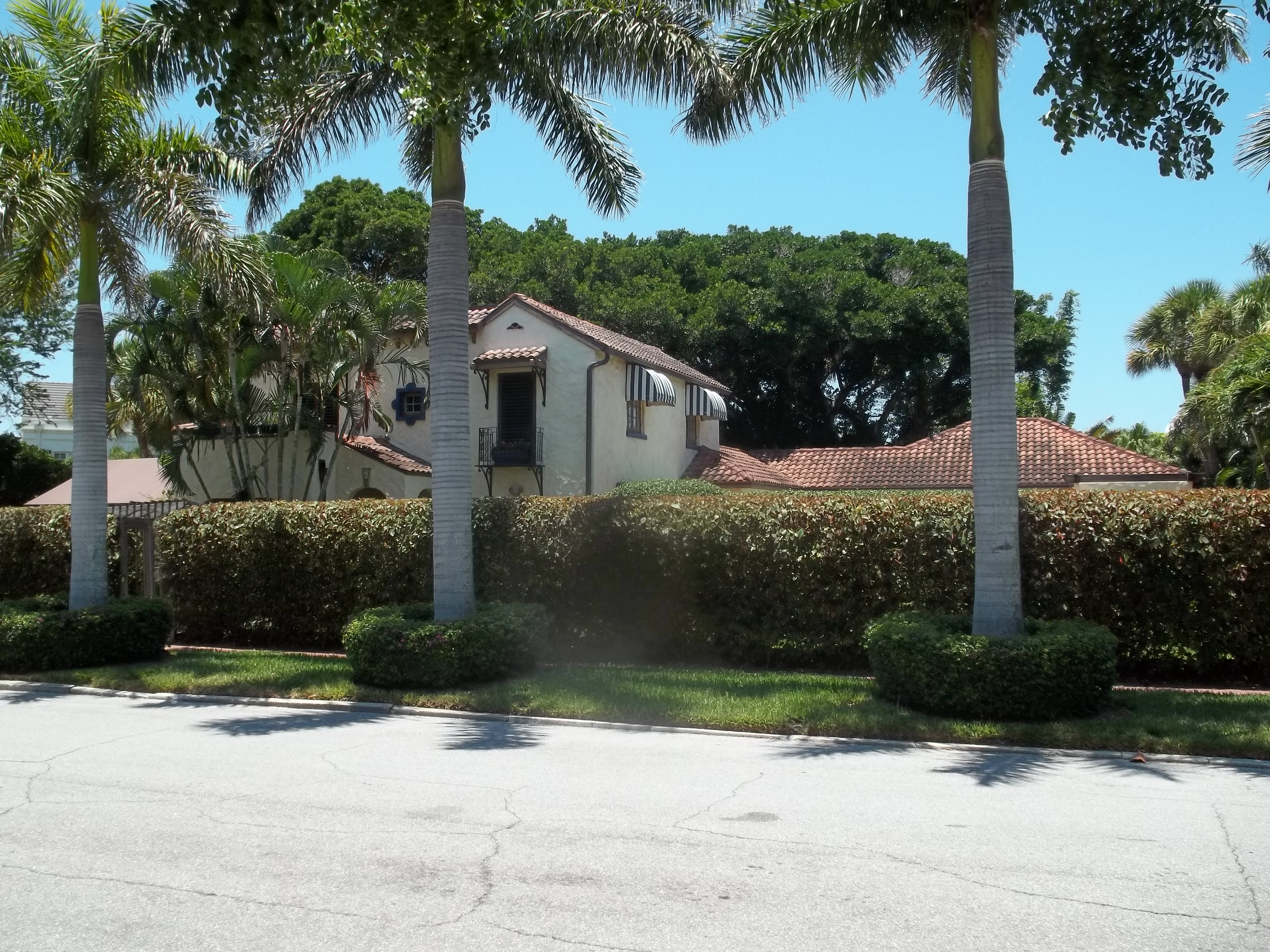

- Location within Florida Location within the United States
- Location: Sarasota, Florida
- Coordinates: 27°19′00.37″N 82°34′29.28″W
- Architectural style: Mission/Spanish Revival
- NRHP reference No.: 98000060
- Added to NRHP: February 5, 1998

The House at 507 Jackson Drive is a historic home in Sarasota, Florida, United States. It is located at 507 Jackson Drive. On February 5, 1998, it was added to the U.S. National Register of Historic Places. Built in 1926, it is a private residence of the Mediterranean Revival architecture style.
