= El Patio Apartments =

- U.S. National Register of Historic Places
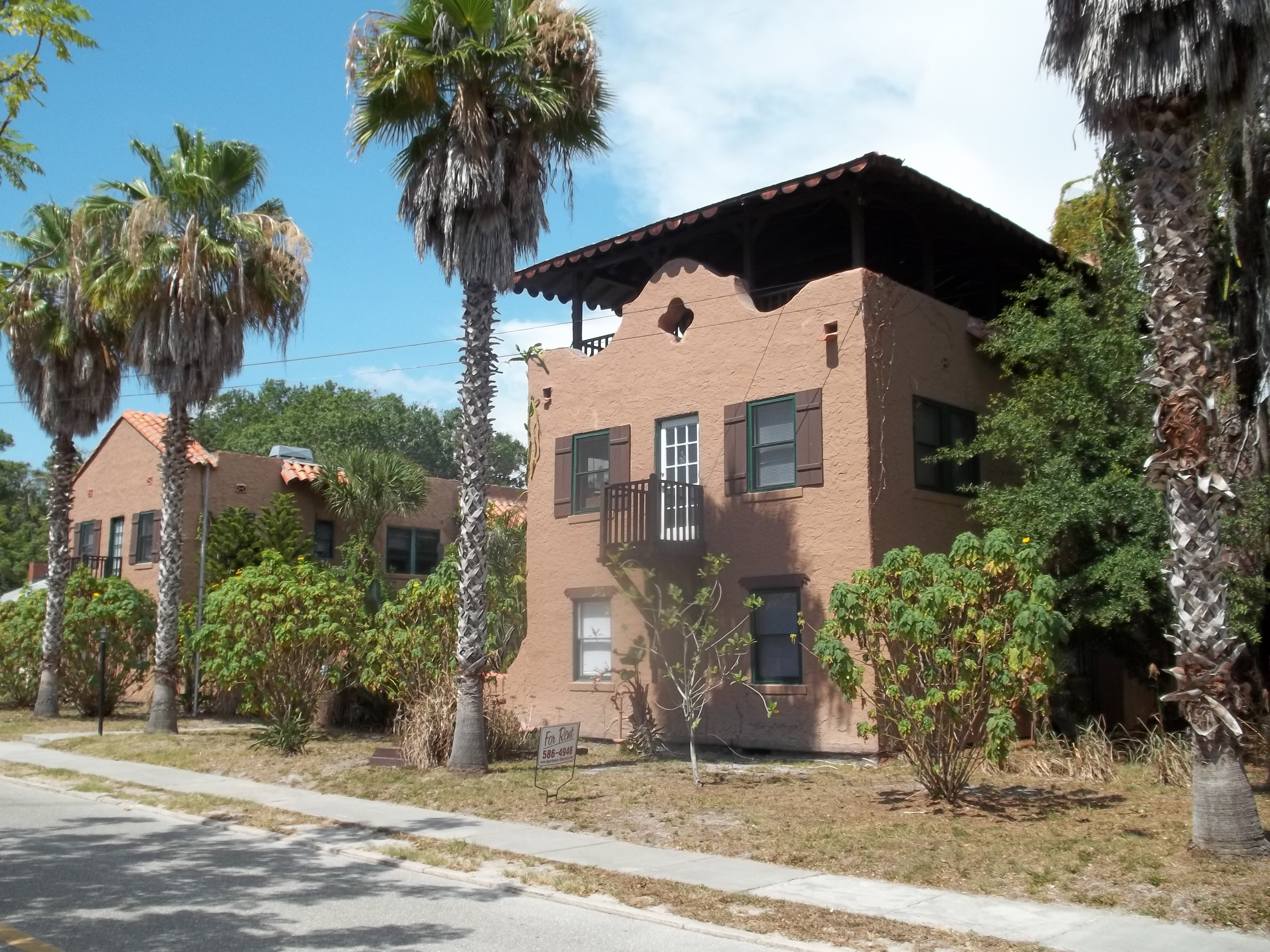
- El Patio Apartments in 2011

- Location within Florida Location within the United States
- Location: Sarasota, Florida
- Coordinates: 27°20′25″N 82°31′37″W
- Architectural style: Mission/Spanish Revival
- NRHP reference No.: 93000390
- Added to NRHP: May 6, 1993

The El Patio Apartments is a historic site in Sarasota, Florida. It is located at 500 North Audubon Place. On May 6, 1993, it was added to the U.S. National Register of Historic Places.

== Gallery ==
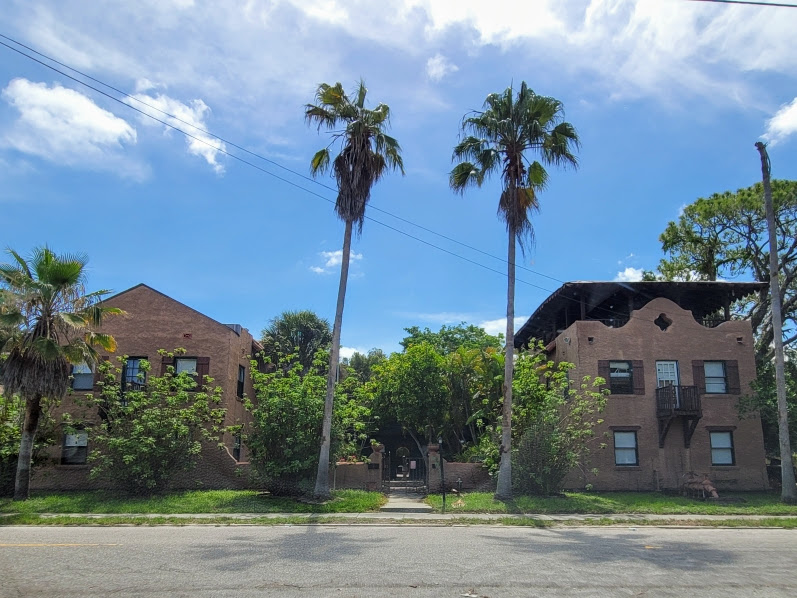
El Patio Apartments in 2022

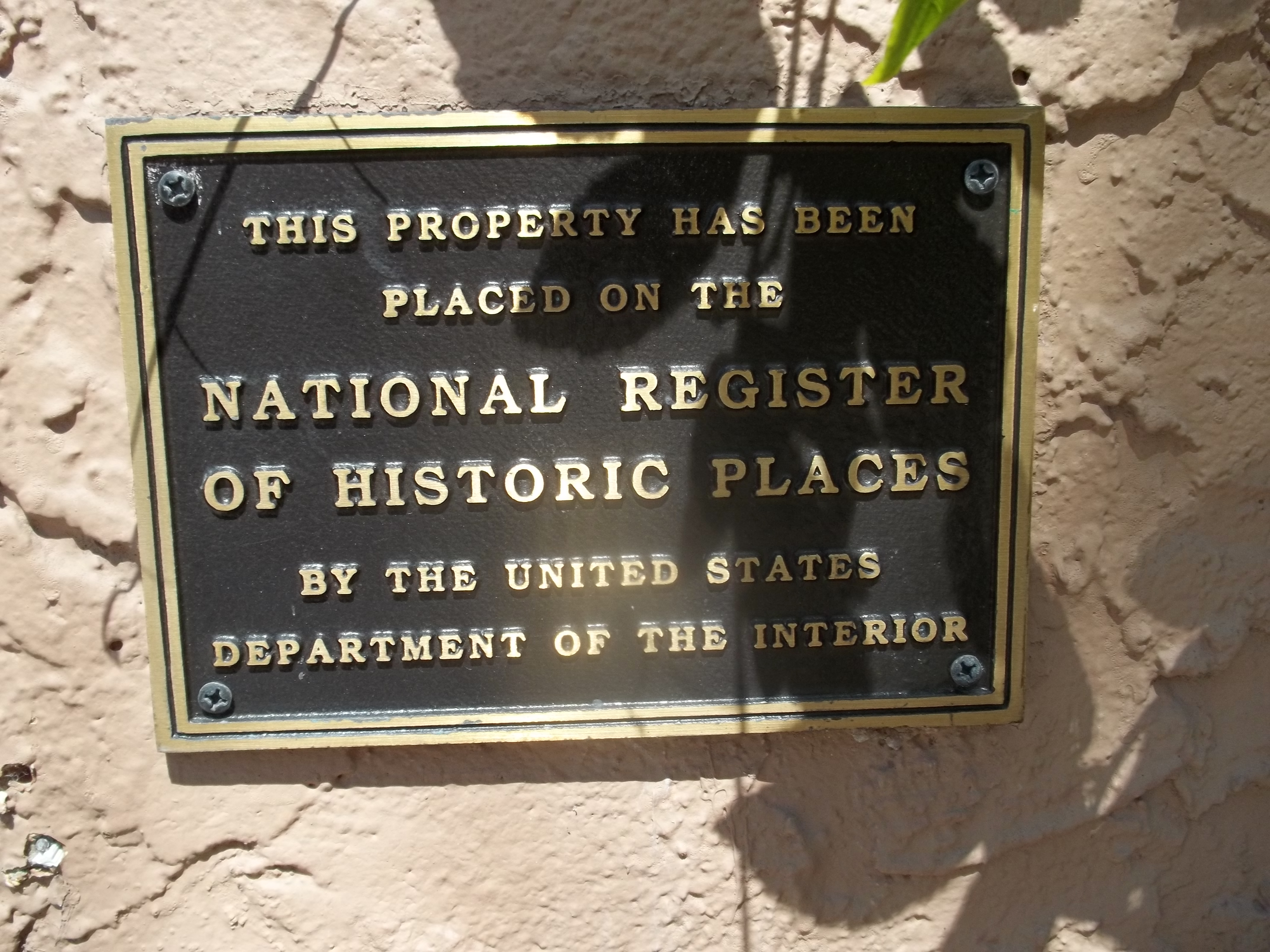
NRHP Plaque
