= Worth's Block =

- U.S. National Register of Historic Places
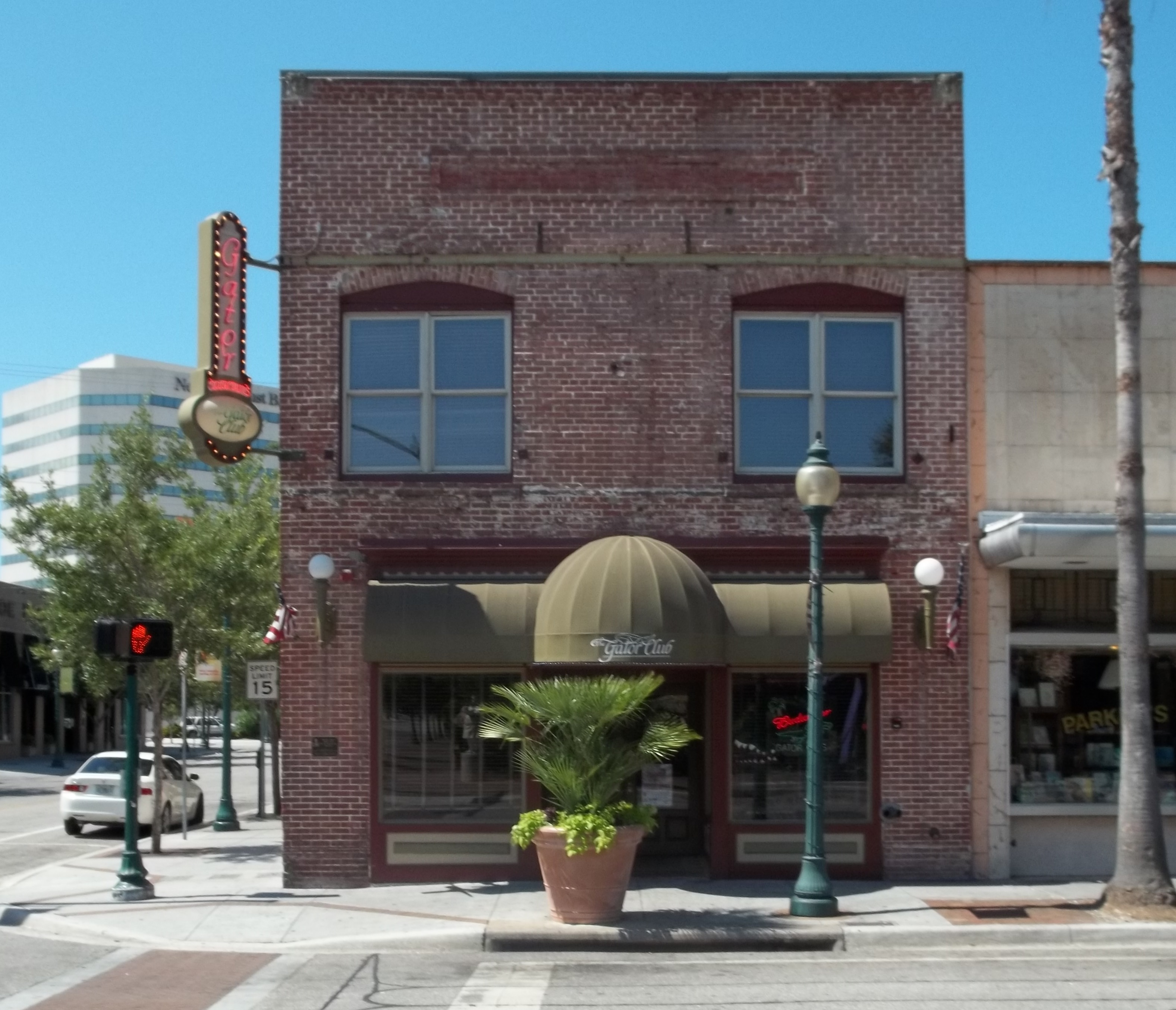

- Location within Florida Location within the United States
- Location: 1490 Main St., Sarasota, Florida
- Coordinates: 27°20′9″N 82°32′27″W
- Area: less than one acre
- Built: 1912, 1928, other
- Built by: Westbrook, W.B.
- NRHP reference No.: 98000651
- Added to NRHP: June 3, 1998

Worth's Block, home to the Gator Club bar and music venue, is a historic building in downtown Sarasota, Florida at 1490 Main Street. It was added to the U.S. National Register of Historic Places in 1998.

A two-story 25 feet (7.6 m) by 100 feet (30 m) masonry commercial building built in 1912, it was modified at different times, including in 1928. Its ground floor was designed for commercial purposes and its second floor was for a residence. As of 1998 its front (north) facade had been restored to its 1912 appearance, with a storefront plus, on the second story, "two sets of paired windows set in segmental arch brick surrounds".

== History ==
In 1903, William Worth moved to Sarasota from Englewood, Florida and purchased a piece of land on the intersection of Lemon Street and Main Street. William Worth was an early member of the Sarasota community, serving as its first tax collector and the first person to run for the office of mayor, but lost to A. B. Edwards in a 108–63 vote. In 1912, Worth's son William David Worth bought his father's business mercantile business and hired his uncle Enoch E. Worth to help him.

== Gallery ==
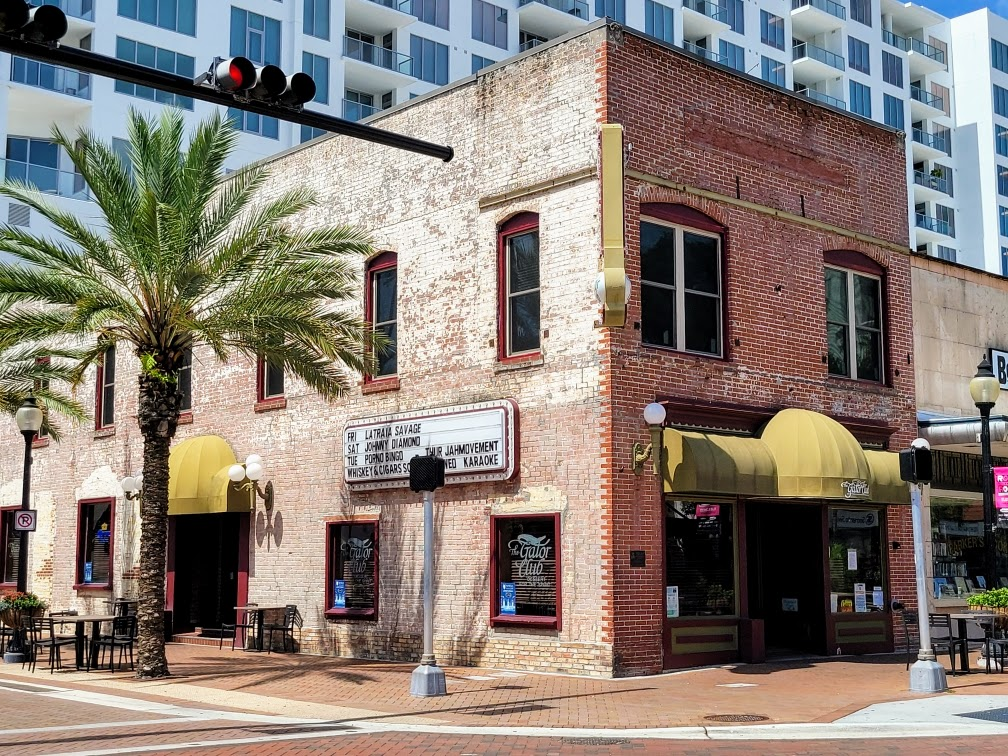
Worth's Block in July 2022
