= Crisp Building =

- U.S. National Register of Historic Places
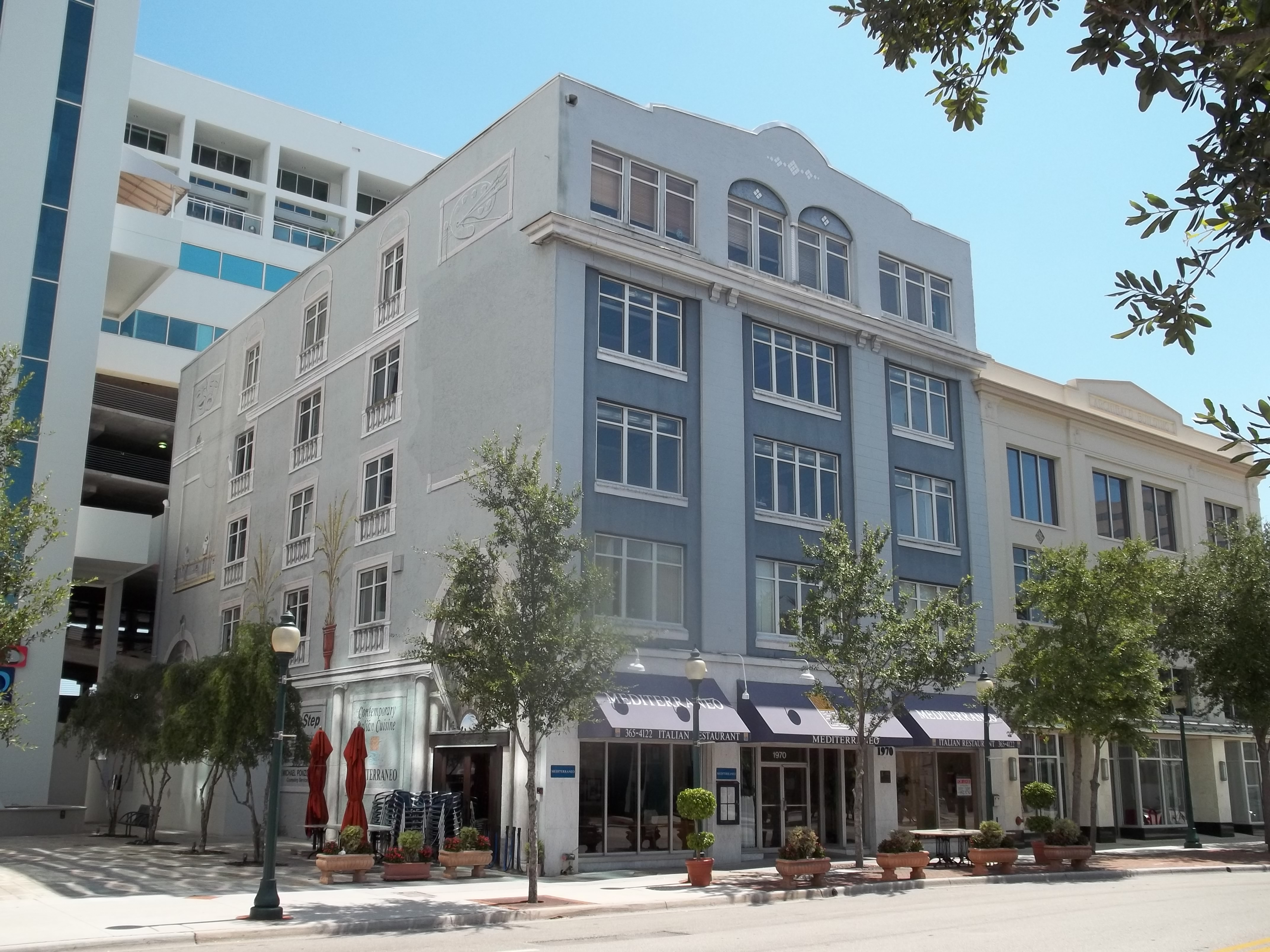

- Location within Florida Location within the United States
- Location: 1970 Main St., Sarasota, Florida
- Coordinates: 27.33633°N 82.53158°W
- Area: less than one acre
- Built: 1926
- Built by: Adair & Sentor
- Architect: Clas, Shepard & Clas
- Architectural style: Mediterranean Revival
- NRHP reference No.: 00000388
- Added to NRHP: April 21, 2000

The Crisp Building is a historic office building at 1970 Main St. in Sarasota, Florida. The T. H. Crisp Company, a developer led by Thomas H. Crisp, constructed the building in 1926. The Crisp Company built many of Sarasota's homes and residential developments in the 1920s and 1930s. The building has also served as a meeting hall for Sarasota's chapter of the Loyal Order of Moose. The building was designed in the Mediterranean Revival style and is one of the best-preserved examples of the style in downtown Sarasota.

It was designed by Clas, Shepard & Clas and was built by contractors Adair & Sentor.

Its original windows were replaced by aluminum ones in 1990. Upper floor interiors were modified in the 1970s; the first floor was renovated during 1990-98. On April 21, 2000, the building was added to the U.S. National Register of Historic Places.
