= Central–Cocoanut Historic District =

Historic district in Florida, United States

- U.S. National Register of Historic Places
- U.S. Historic district
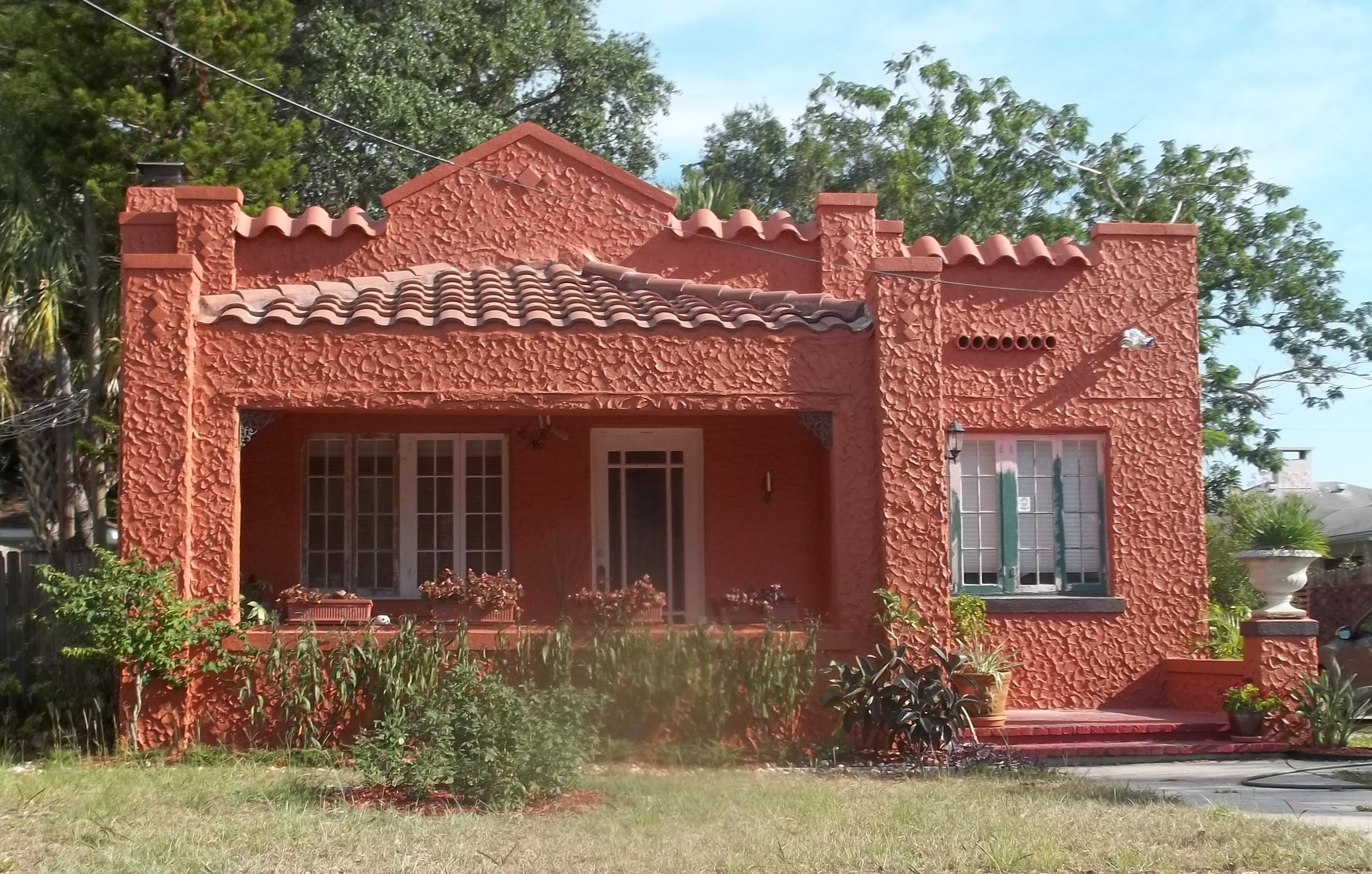

- Location within Florida Location within the United States
- Location: Sarasota, Florida
- Coordinates: 27°21′5″N 82°32′38″W
- NRHP reference No.: 05000599
- Added to NRHP: 17 June 2005

The Central–Cocoanut Historic District is a U.S. historic district (designated as such on June 17, 2005) located in Sarasota, Florida. The district is along Cocoanut Avenue, between 11th and 22nd Streets to the south and north, and between Tamiami Trail and the railroad tracks to the west and east.

== Gallery ==
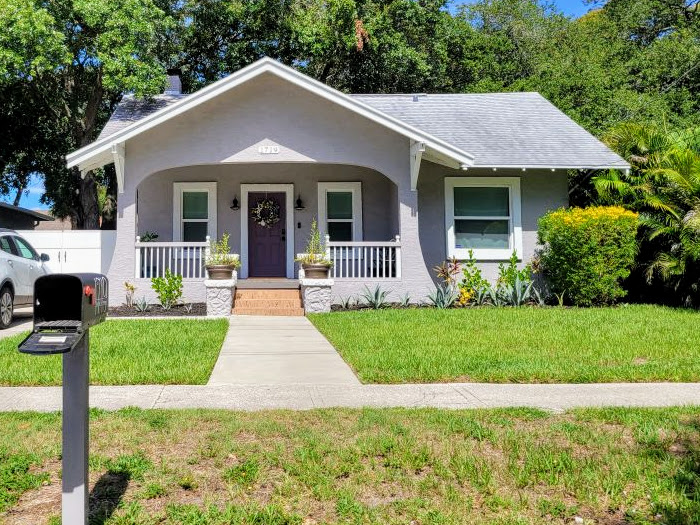
1719 Central Avenue - Built ca. 1925

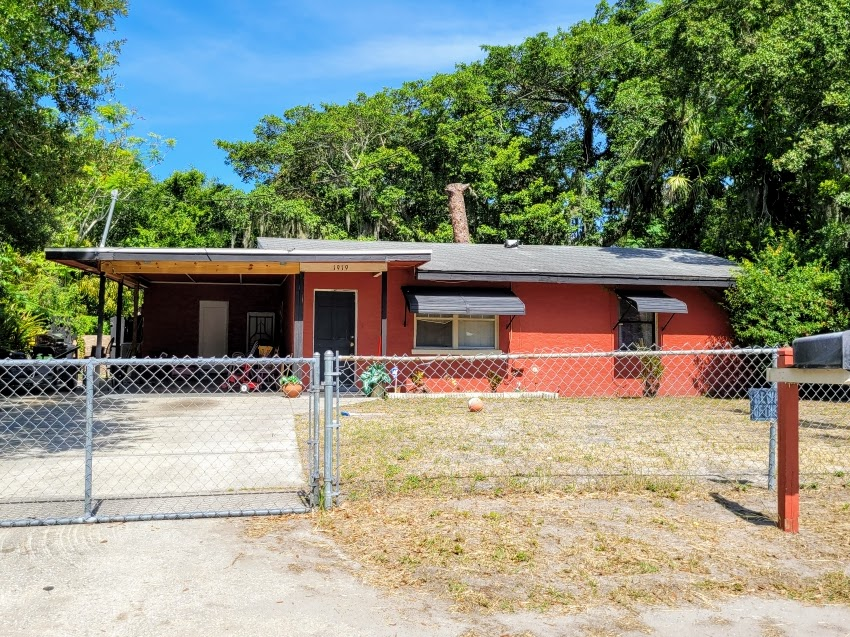
1919 Central Avenue - Built ca. 1945

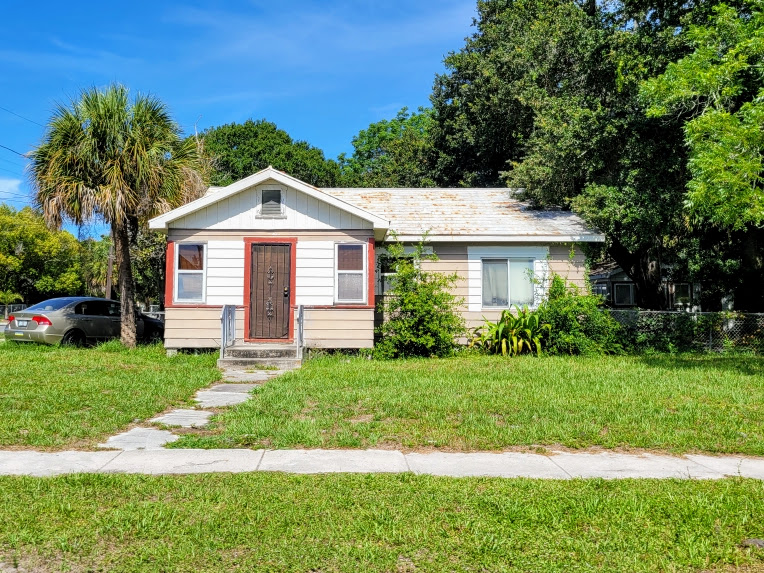
1405 Central Avenue - Built ca. 1943
