= Thomas House (Sarasota, Florida) =

Historic house in Florida, United States

- U.S. National Register of Historic Places
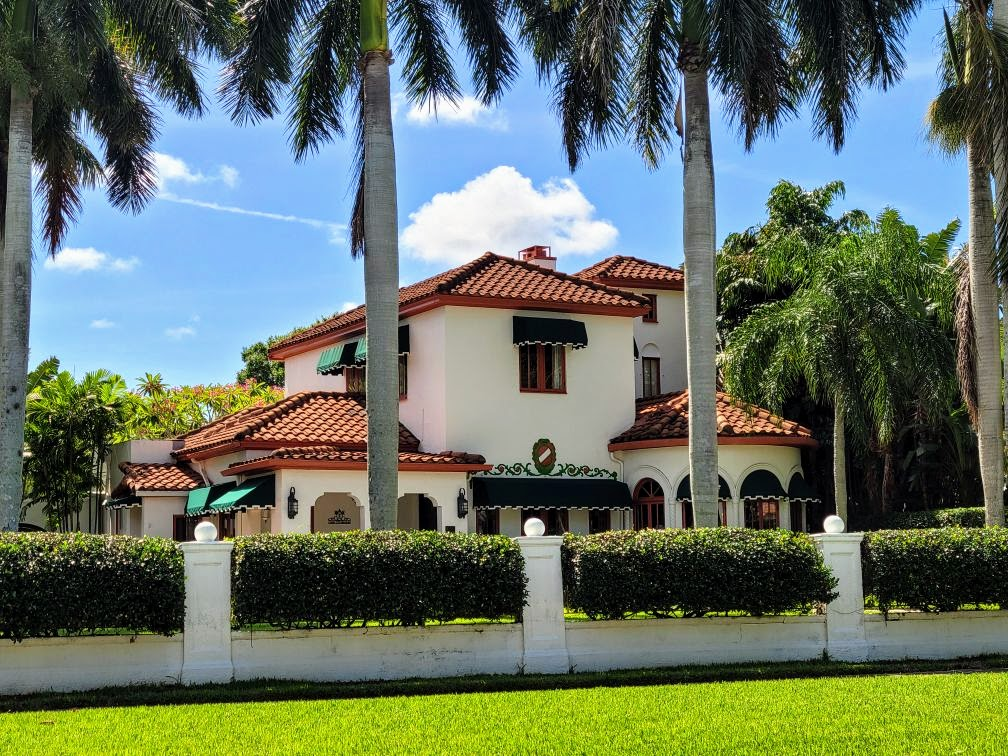

- Location within Florida Location within the United States
- Location: Sarasota, Florida
- Coordinates: 27°22′38″N 82°33′36″W
- Architectural style: Mission/Spanish Revival
- NRHP reference No.: 94000666
- Added to NRHP: July 1, 1994

The Thomas House is a historic home in Sarasota, Florida. It is located at 5030 Bay Shore Road. On July 1, 1994, it was added to the U.S. National Register of Historic Places.

== References and external links ==
- Sarasota County listings at National Register of Historic Places
- Sarasota County listings at Florida's Office of Cultural and Historical Programs
