= J. G. Whitfield Estate =

Historic house in Florida, United States

- U.S. National Register of Historic Places
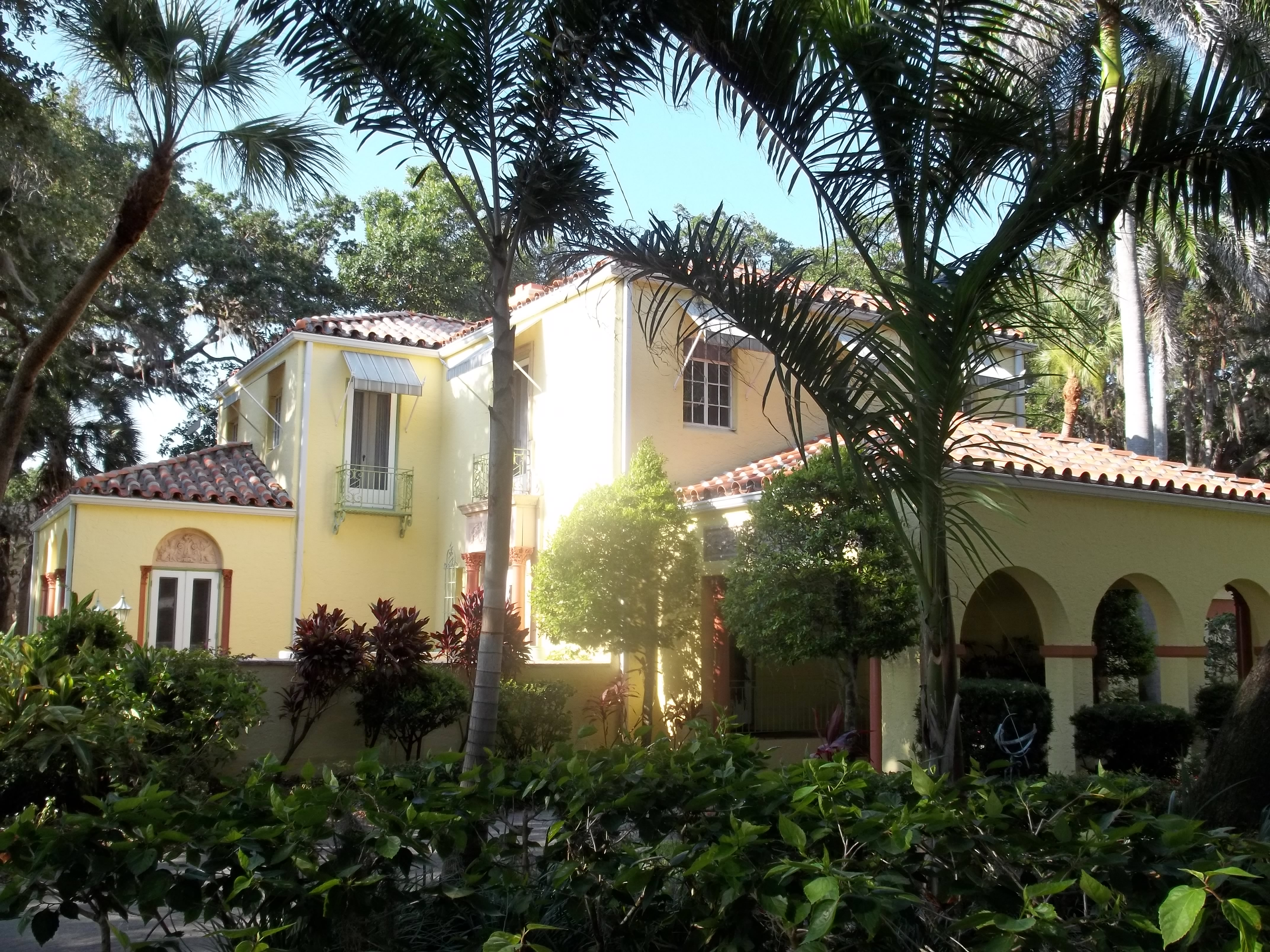

- Location within Florida Location within the United States
- Location: Sarasota, Florida
- Coordinates: 27°21′35″N 82°33′17″W
- NRHP reference No.: 85002177
- Added to NRHP: September 12, 1985

The J. G. Whitfield Estate is a historic site in Sarasota, Florida. It is located at 2704 Bayshore Drive. On September 12, 1985, it was added to the U.S. National Register of Historic Places.

== References and external links ==
- Sarasota County listings at National Register of Historic Places
- Sarasota County listings at Florida's Office of Cultural and Historical Programs
