= Bryson-Crane House =

Historic house in Florida, United States

- U.S. National Register of Historic Places
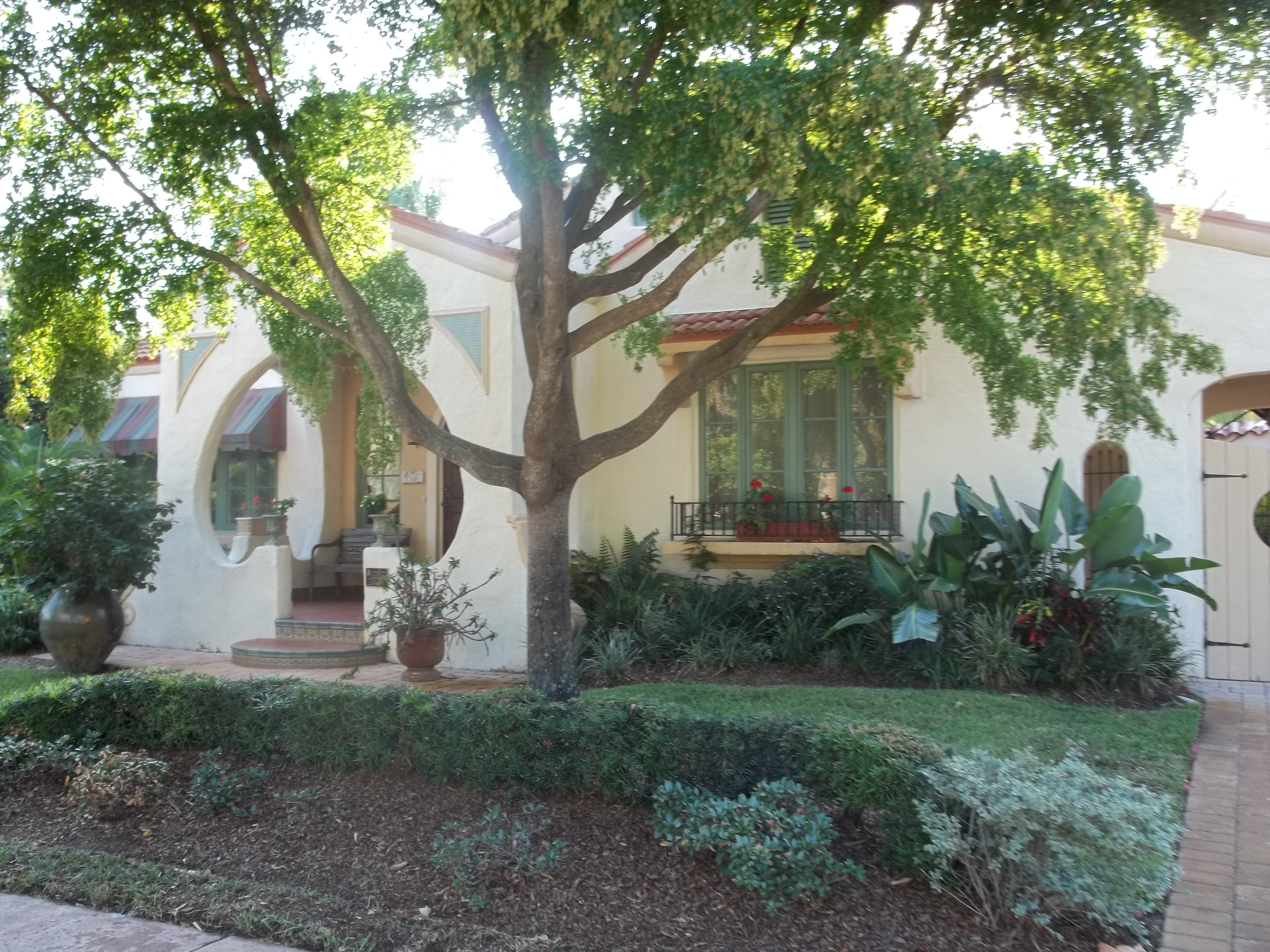

- Location within Florida Location within the United States
- Location: Sarasota, Florida
- Coordinates: 27°22′39″N 82°33′34″W
- Built: 1925
- Architectural style: Late 19th And 20th Century Revivals
- NRHP reference No.: 05000501
- Added to NRHP: 1 June 2005

The Bryson-Crane House is a home in Sarasota, Florida that was built in 1926 at 5050 Brywill Circle. On June 1, 2005, it was added to the U.S. National Register of Historic Places.

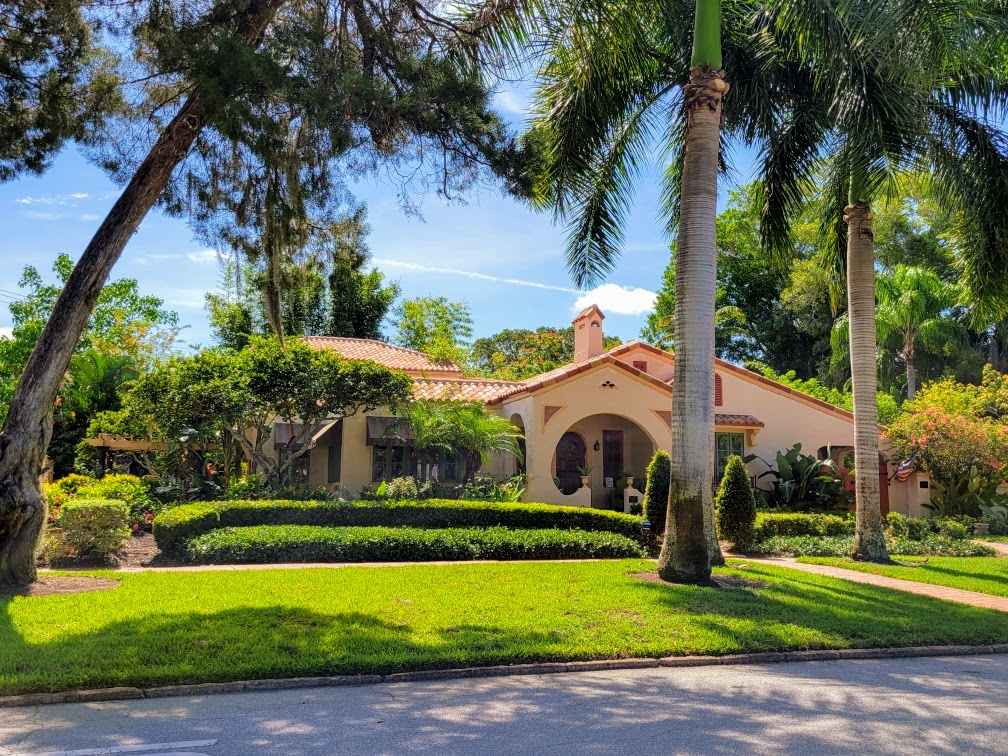
Bryson-Crane House - July 2022

Designed as a Spanish style bungalow by the same architect who created Ca d’Zan for circus magnate John Ringling, the house was built in 1925. It was riginally the residence of Walter Bryson, the developer – partner of John Ringling in creating the Sapphire Shores neighborhood. The street name “Brywill” is a combination of his name and that of the realtor for the project, Wilson. Bryson's sister-in-law lived across Mecca in the other Spanish bungalow, and the families designed facing entrances across the street from one another. Both were later converted to face Brywill Circle.

Bryson returned to Jacksonville by 1930, and the property was purchased by Harvey Crane, who acquired adjoining lots to create the larger property we know today. Following their move to a retirement home in 1946, several families resided here, including two main families: the Huddleston's and the Hancock's.

Original history on the property assumed that the larger, two bedroom tower at the northeast corner of the home was added by Crane when the additional land was acquired, but in 2016 the repair of an interior door in the tower section unearthed newspaper sheets used to pad a door-mounted mirror. Although no date was visible, a clue was found in a review of a new book that was printed in 1928, thus pre-dating the Crane renovations. As such, the bedroom tower was likely included in the original 1925 construction design.

By the late 1990s, Everette Hancock was a 94 year old widower, living in the house with his son. Deciding to marry his deceased wife's sister in Tennessee “because she’s a good cook”, he listed the house for sale. The property was in poor condition and was renovated completely in 2001, a process that was quite painstaking in order to preserve the original historic elements of the property.

Following significant historical research and a rigorous application process, the home was eventually added to the historic register of Sarasota and was then listed on the National Historic Register.
