= Southwick-Harmon House =

Historic house in Florida, United States

- U.S. National Register of Historic Places
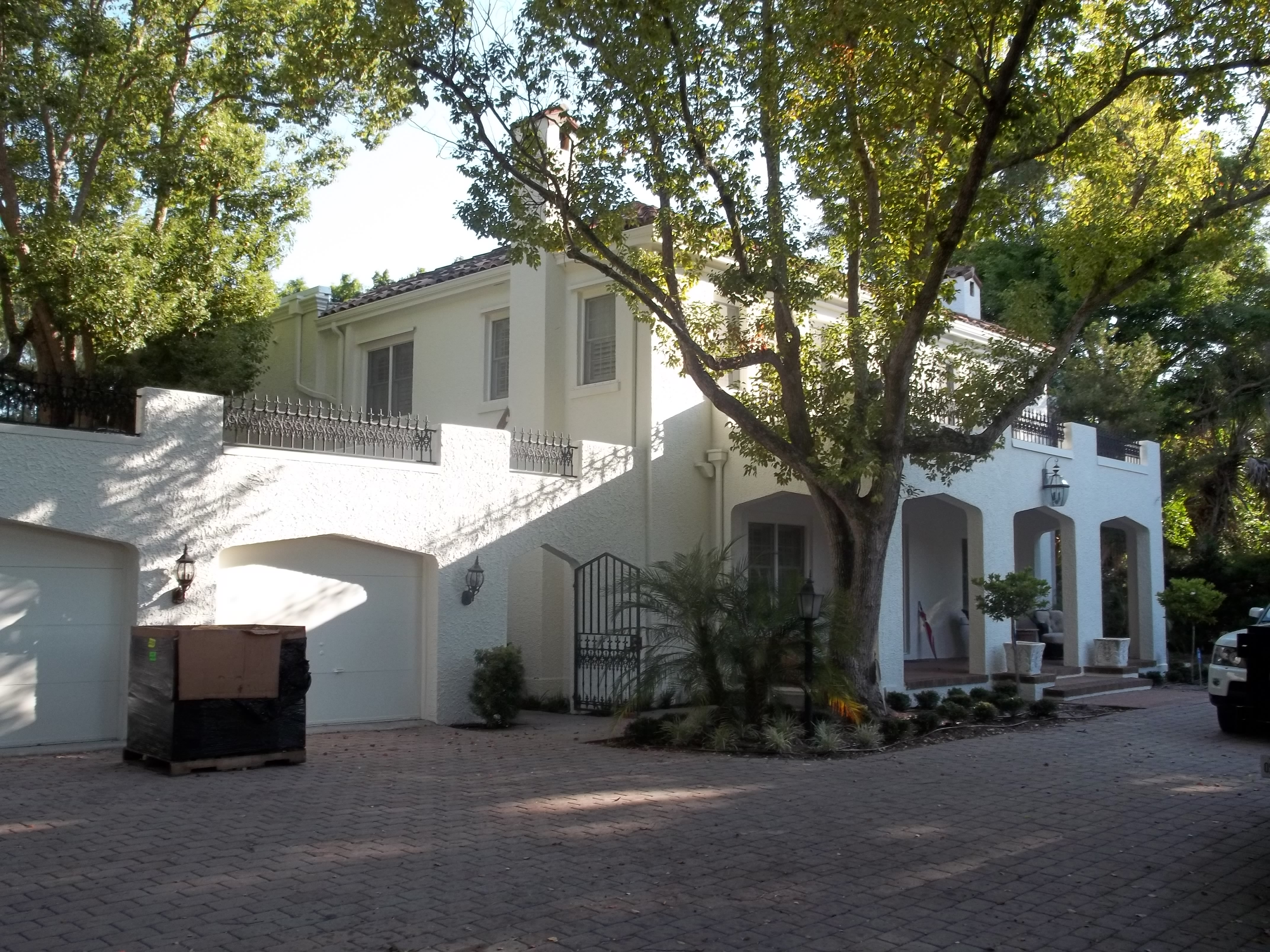

- Location within Florida Location within the United States
- Location: Sarasota, Florida
- Coordinates: 27°19′39″N 82°31′59″W
- Architectural style: Mission/Spanish Revival
- NRHP reference No.: 01001180
- Added to NRHP: October 28, 2001

The Southwick-Harmon House is a historic home in Sarasota, Florida. It is located at 1830 Lincoln Drive. On October 28, 2001, it was added to the U.S. National Register of Historic Places.

== References and external links ==
- Sarasota County listings at National Register of Historic Places
- Southwick-Harmon House at Portal of Historic Resources, State of Florida
