= Riverview High School (Sarasota, Florida) =

Coordinates: 27.2822702°N 82.5181527°W

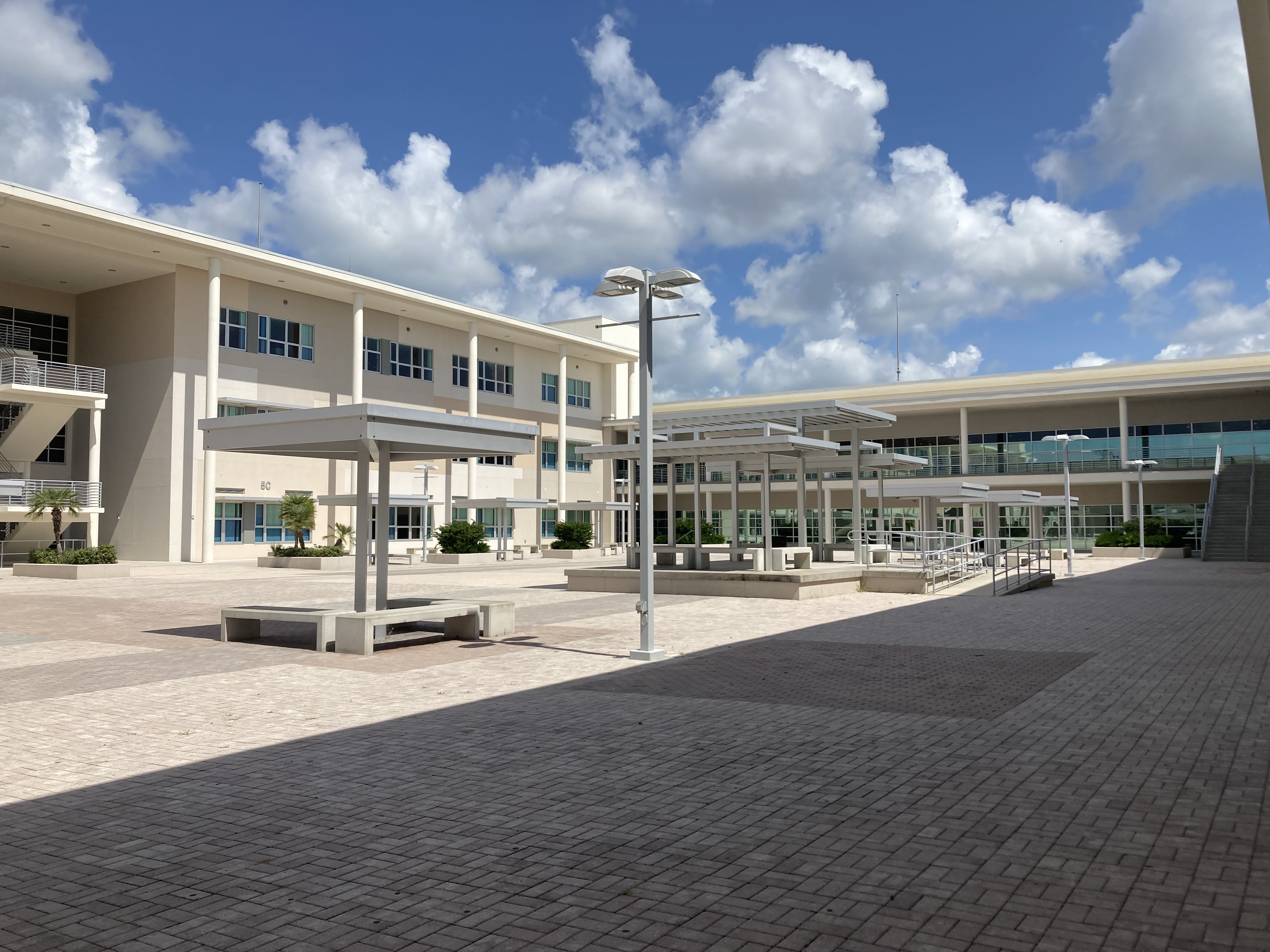
- New campus courtyard

Location
- 1 Ram Way; Sarasota, Florida 34231; United States

Information
- Type: Public High School
- School district: Sarasota County Public Schools
- Principal: Erin Haughey
- Staff: 131.15 (FTE)
- Grades: 9-12
- Enrollment: 2,681 (2023-2024)
- Student to teacher ratio: 20.44
- Colors: Maroon; White
- Mascot: Rams
- Rival: Sarasota High School
- Yearbook: The Tartan
- Website: www.sarasotacountyschools.net/o/riverview/

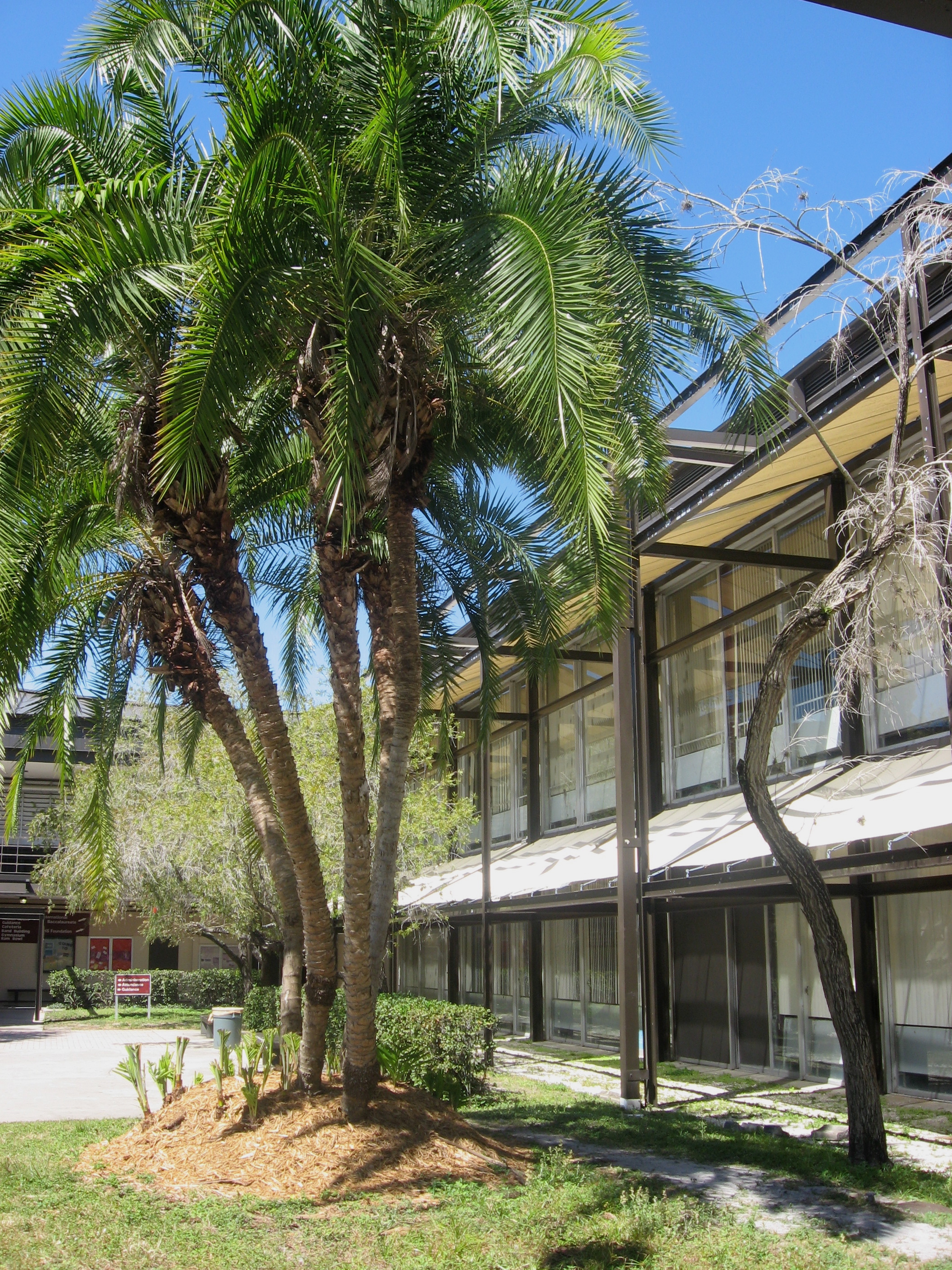
A 2007 view of the courtyard entrance shows the former building's International Style architecture, where ornament was absent in favor of exposed steel and glass

Riverview High School is a four-year public high school in Sarasota, Florida, United States. Riverview educates students from ninth grade to twelfth grade. As of the 2022-2023 school year, the school had 2,606 students and 127 teachers. The school's mascot is the ram. As of the 2015-2016 school year, it is the largest school in the county.

Notable programs at the school include the International Baccalaureate Program, a rigorous academic regimen that prepares its candidates on an international rubric and prepares them for further education; a Chamber Choir that has performed in Europe and New York's Carnegie Hall; and the Riverview High School Kiltie Band, a group of about 220 musicians that has marched three times in the Macy's Thanksgiving Day parade and has traveled to perform in Ireland, California, and many other places.

== Programs ==
Riverview offers the International Baccalaureate Diploma Program (IBDP) and the International Baccalaureate Career-related Program (IBCP), which are rigorous pre-university courses that lead to college credit based on an exit exam. Accredited as an IB Diploma school in January 1999, Riverview has an average IB Diploma pass rate of 90% and provides around 800 students across all grades with rigorous university-prep work.

In the IBDP curriculum, students pursue rigorous coursework in six subject groups (primary language, secondary language, experimental sciences, social sciences, mathematics, and the arts) and the DP core. This DP core comprises the Theory of Knowledge (TOK) two-year course; the creativity, activity, service (CAS) project, which is their service learning component; and the extended essay, a 3,000-4,000 word research paper chosen by the student.

In 2014, Riverview became an IB Career-Related School. In the IBCP program, students take a minimum of two IBDP course, a core program consisting of four components with an emphasis on personal and professional skills, and a career-related study. There are six IBCP tracks at Riverview: Marine Science, Engineering, International Business, ROTC, Computer Science and Theater Arts.

Riverview High's Marine Science program is known for their extensive Aqua Dome. The aqua dome is home to 12 freshwater crypts, containing Tilapia and Koi and 36 saltwater aquaria containing Clownfish, Bangai Cardinals, and Fang Blennies. A part of the Marine Science program, Riverview's Stars to Starfish program, which includes tours of the Planetarium as well as the Aqua dome, serves more than 7000 elementary and middle schools students annually and hosts "Open to the Public" community events.

Riverview's athletic department includes 15 sports, such as football, volleyball, and lacrosse. Boys Basketball won the Regional Champion for 2016 and placed 2nd in the State Competition. Riverview 2014 FHSAA Academic Team Champion Awards for the highest grade points for all athletes in district 8A. The girls swim team has won 6 of the last 7 state championships. The boys' team has won the district championship for the past three years.

== The Rudolph building, 1958-2009 ==
Riverview's old main building opened in 1958, and included a planetarium. The main building was designed by noted International Style architect Paul Rudolph, dean of the Yale School of Architecture. While Rudolph was later associated with the architectural style Brutalism, Riverview was in the International Style. It was one of the best-known structures associated with the Sarasota School of Architecture, sometimes referred to as Sarasota Modern.

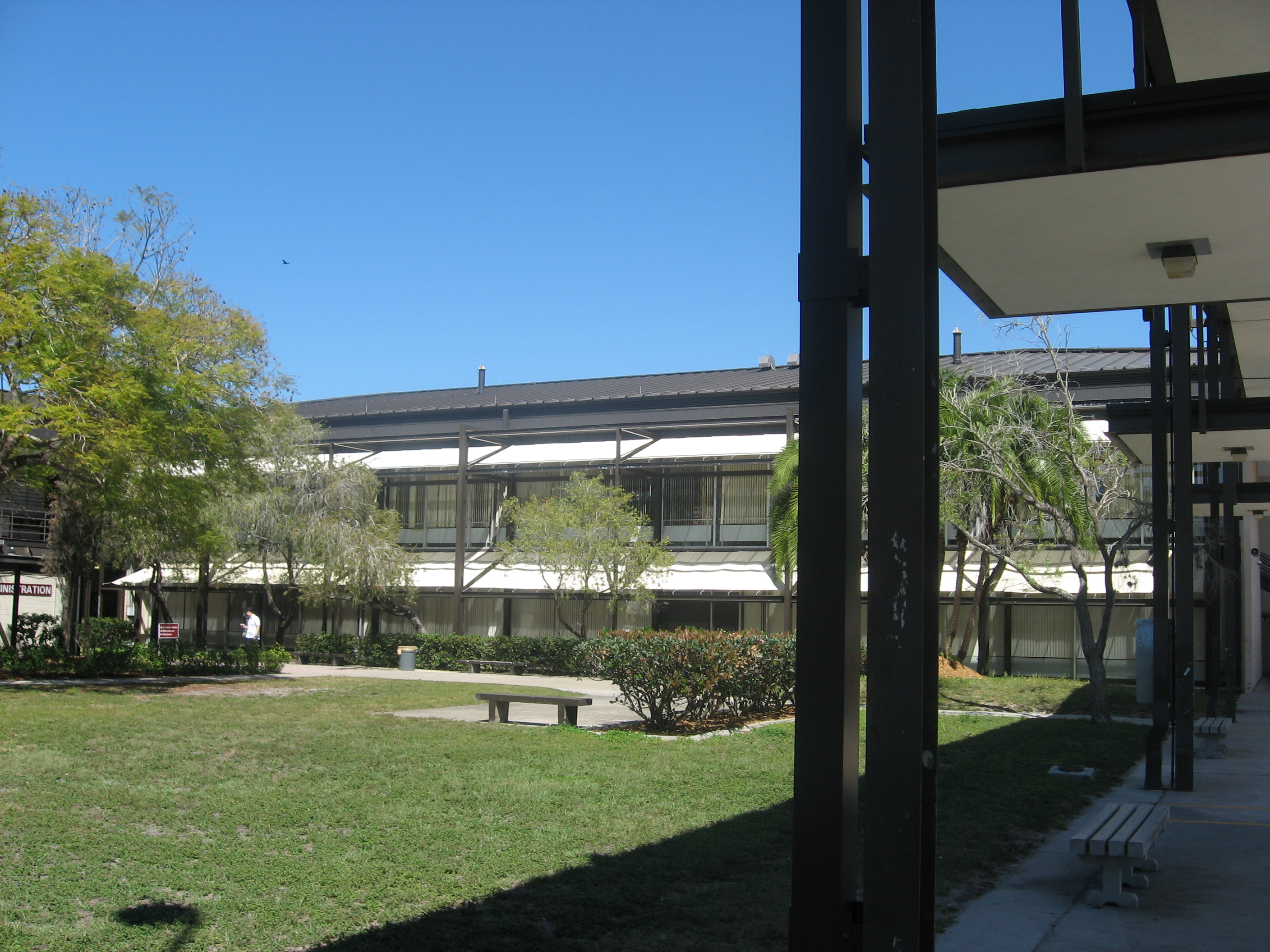
The old cafeteria was located just behind the administration building, and opened onto this main courtyard

In 2006, Sarasota County approved spending an estimated $130 million on the reconstruction of the school, which would include demolition of the Rudolph building. The new high school building would increase classroom space and bring the school's facilities up to date. The Rudolph structures would be replaced with a big parking lot.

The building's critics contended that Rudolph's roof design, which was intended to make runoff water resemble a "waterfall," caused water to pool dangerously in the hallways. School officials also asserted that mold was an ongoing problem. Proponents for restoration of the buildings cited that inappropriate alterations to the original design had created some of the problems and that proper maintenance had been deferred as well, making the problems seem much greater, but that remedial action was feasible.

The demolition plans were opposed by historic preservationists, including the directors of the Sarasota Architectural Foundation, the directors of the Sarasota Alliance for Historic Preservation, the founder of Friends of Seagate, and the president-elect of American Institute of Architects, Florida.

Riverview High School was placed on the Florida Trust for Historic Preservation's list of the most endangered historic sites and was nominated for placement on the National Trust for Historic Preservation 2007 list of the America's Most Endangered Places. It was also placed on the World Monuments Fund's 2008 List of 100 Most Endangered Sites in the listing "Main Street Modern."

At a January 2007 Sarasota public meeting, Kafi Benz, the founder of Friends of Seagate asked Andres Duany to relate the prevailing international opinion regarding the demolition plans for Riverview High School. In what time would prove overstatement, he said that Sarasota's reputation as a leader in the arts would be destroyed, forever, if demolition of this significant structure were allowed. In February 2007, and after pressure from the National Trust for Historic Preservation, the school board agreed to consider new options in lieu of demolition.

Considering the international concern expressed about the cultural value of the buildings, as well as the actions of a local organization formed to advance alternative plans for the new development that would include restoration of the Rudolph structures and placing the parking lot intended to replace it under the athletic fields, on March 20, 2007 the school board announced that it would allow a year for consideration of implementation of alternative proposals. This followed a charrette conducted locally by the National Trust for Historic Preservation, where the plan for relocating the parking lot was proposed.

The office of architect Carl Abbott, FAIA, who is considered a member of the Sarasota School of Architecture, released information about a co-operative effort by the Save Riverview Committee, the Florida Association of Architects, and the Sarasota Architectural Foundation, at which the documentary Site Specific: The History of Regional Modernism, by Susan Szenasy, editor in chief of Metropolis magazine, was previewed on March 24 at Burns Court Cinema in Sarasota. In the film, Szenasy explored the historic significance of Riverview High School and featured expressions of the concern of architects around the world compared with the designer of the new campus and a maintenance staff member at the school. The film was intended for a lecture tour of the United States by Szenasy, who planned to discuss the issues of historic preservation, community history, and the education of students.

On June 17, 2008, however, the school board voted three to two to raze Rudolph's structure, with members Frank Kovach, Caroline Zucker and Shirley Brown making the majority vote. It was demolished in June 2009, and the new school building opened in August of the same year.

== Notable alumni ==
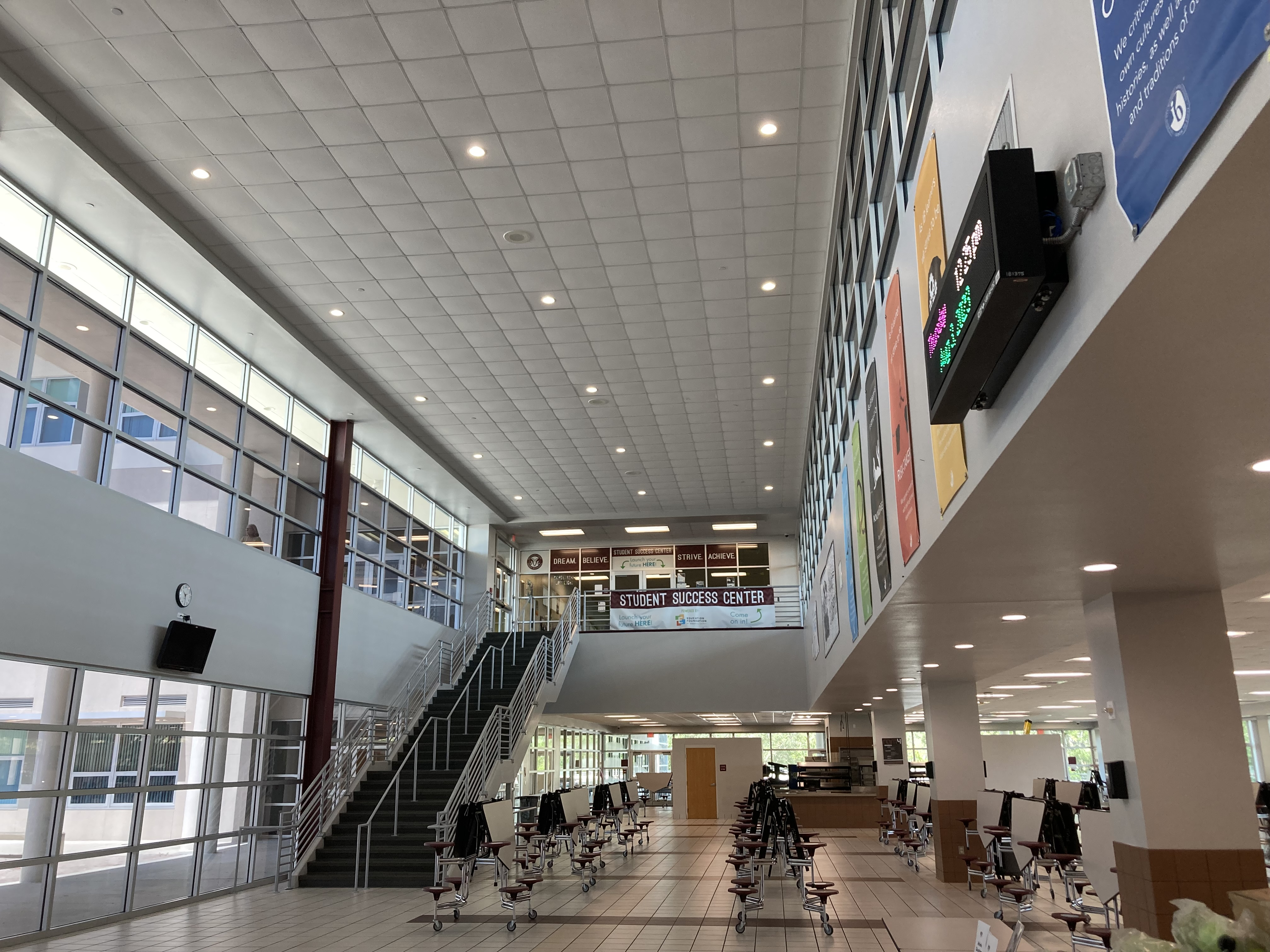
New campus cafeteria

- Sharyl Attkisson – American television journalist
- David Baas – Former American football player (center) with the New York Giants.
- Mike Bell - Baseball coach
- Bob Buchanan – Former professional baseball player (Cincinnati Reds, Kansas City Royals).
- Dick Chapura – former NFL player
- Todd Combs – Hedge fund manager who has been tapped as a potential successor of Warren Buffett as the chief investment officer of Berkshire Hathaway
- Joe DePastino – Former professional baseball player (New York Mets) and former minor league Manager of the West Michigan Whitecaps.
- Luis Elizondo – Former Military intelligence officer, UFO/UAP disclosure advocate.
- Tony Green - American Football player
- Chris Hannon – Former American Football player (wide receiver).
- Karan Higdon – American football player
- Mike Hiss – Racing car driver in the USAC Championship Car series, finishing 7th in the Indianapolis 500 in 1972, and winning the "rookie of the Year" title.
- Amy Holton - American tennis player.
- David Howard – Former professional baseball player (Kansas City Royals, St. Louis Cardinals)and former minor league hitting coach.
- Amarri Jackson - American football player
- Richie James - American football player for the San Francisco 49ers
- Jamar Johnson - American football player
- Todd Johnson – Former American football player (safety), former Riverview High School head football coach.
- Neil Larsen - American jazz keyboardist, musical arranger and composer
- Troy Mattes – Former professional baseball player (Montreal Expos) and former minor league pitching coach.
- Drew Miller - American football offensive lineman for the Jacksonville Jaguars and St. Louis Rams
- Guy Peterson - American architect
- Kyle Snyder – Former professional baseball player (Kansas City Royals, Boston Red Sox and current pitching coach of the Tampa Bay Rays.
- Chad Sobotka - American professional baseball pitcher for the Milwaukee Brewers and Atlanta Braves.
- Davide Somma – Former Soccer player, with Leeds United
- Howard Tayler - American cartoonist and creator of Schlock Mercenary.
- Courtney Watson - American football linebacker with the New Orleans Saints
- Emma Weyant - US national champion and Olympic medley swimmer. Emma finished first in the 500-yard freestyle at the 2022 NCAA Division I Women's Swimming and Diving Championships with a time of 4:34:99.

== Gallery ==
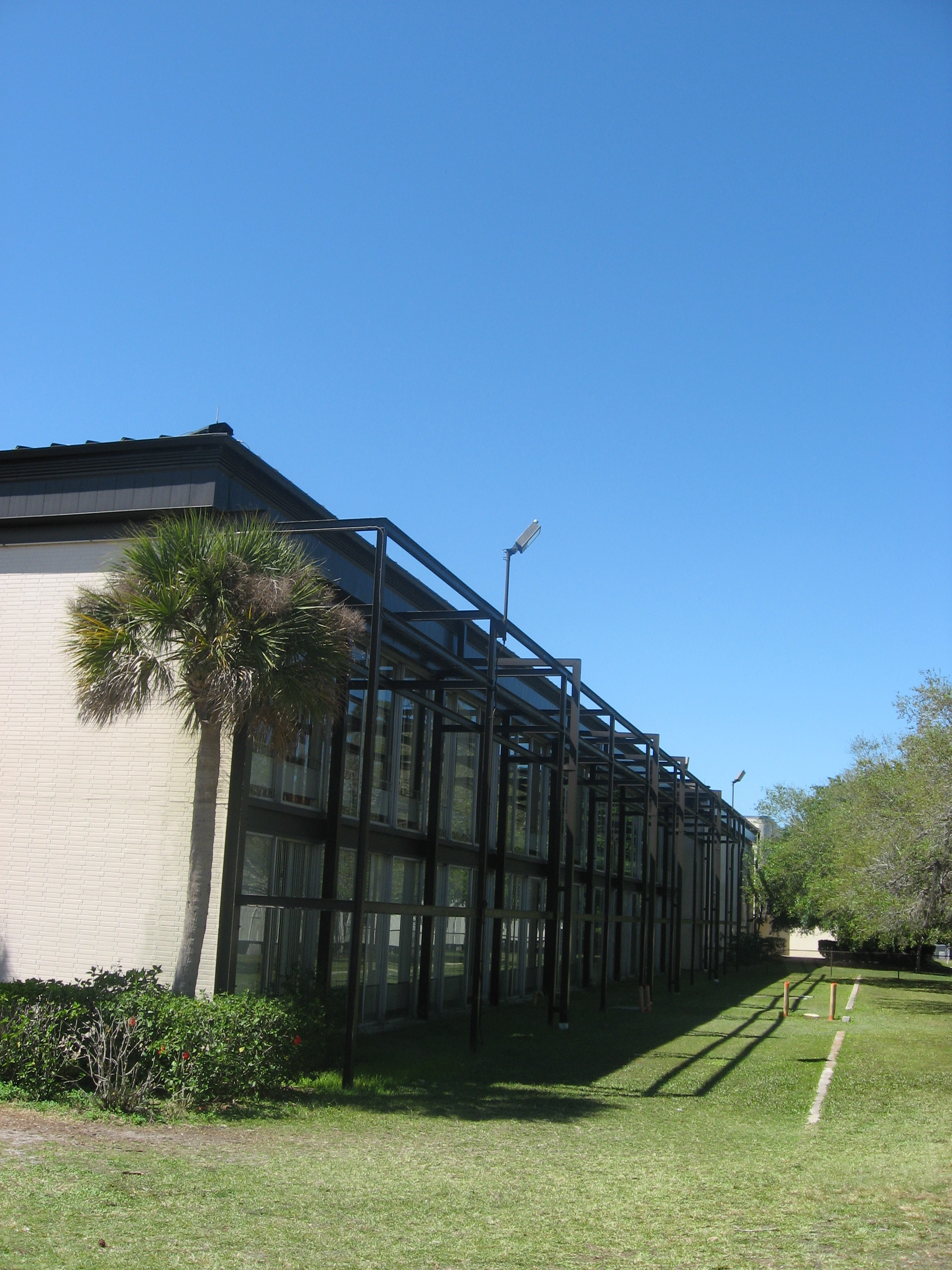

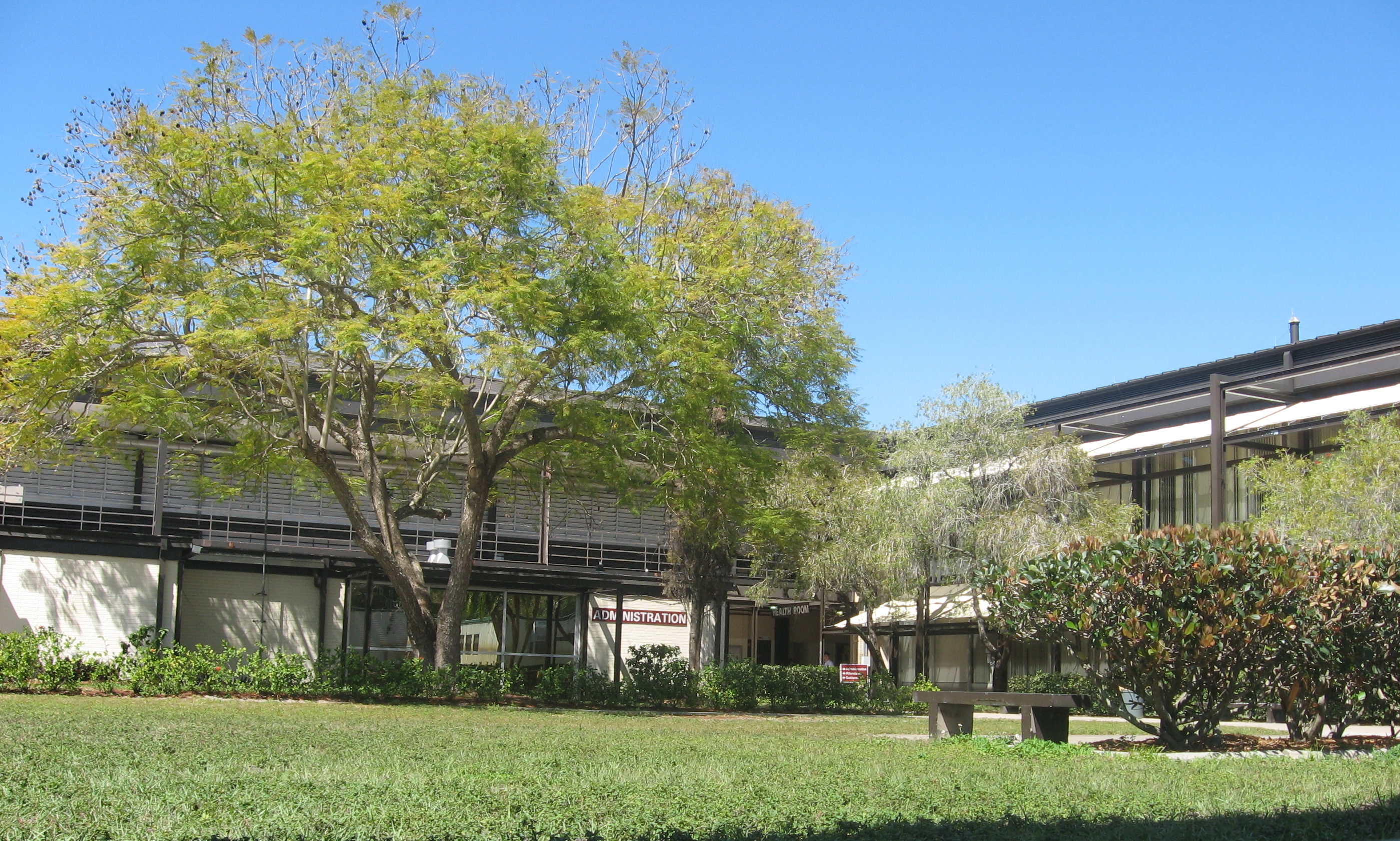

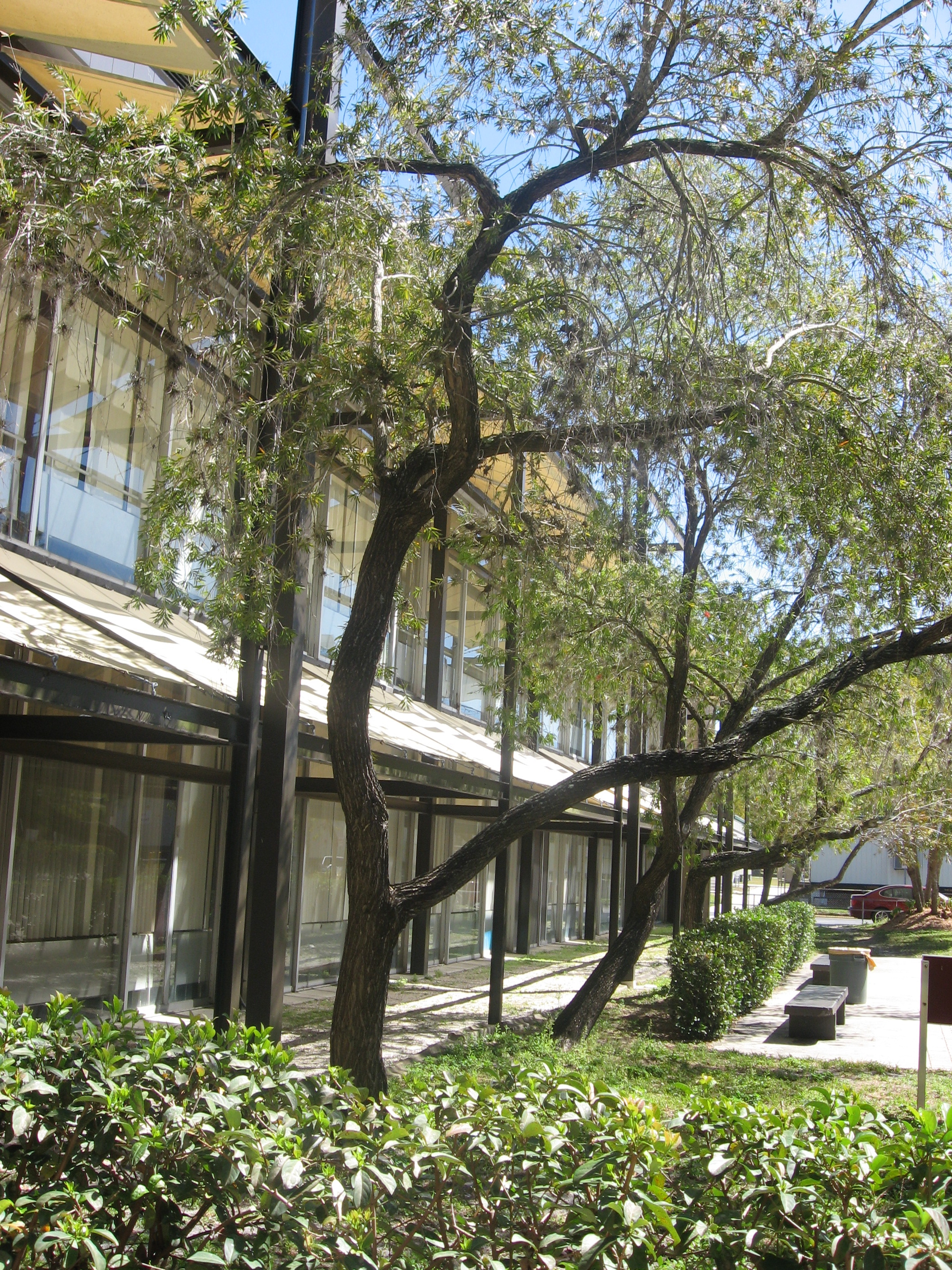

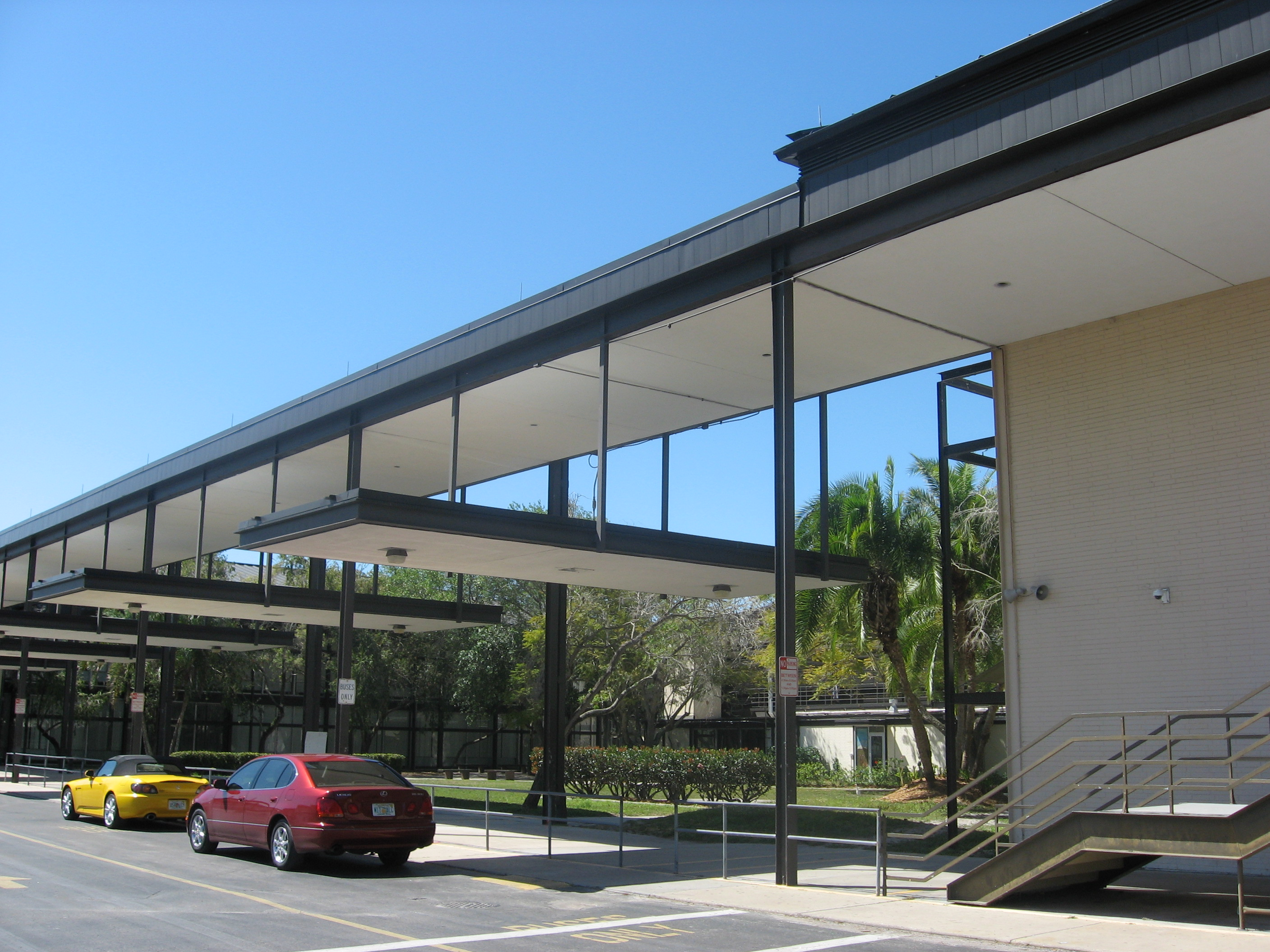

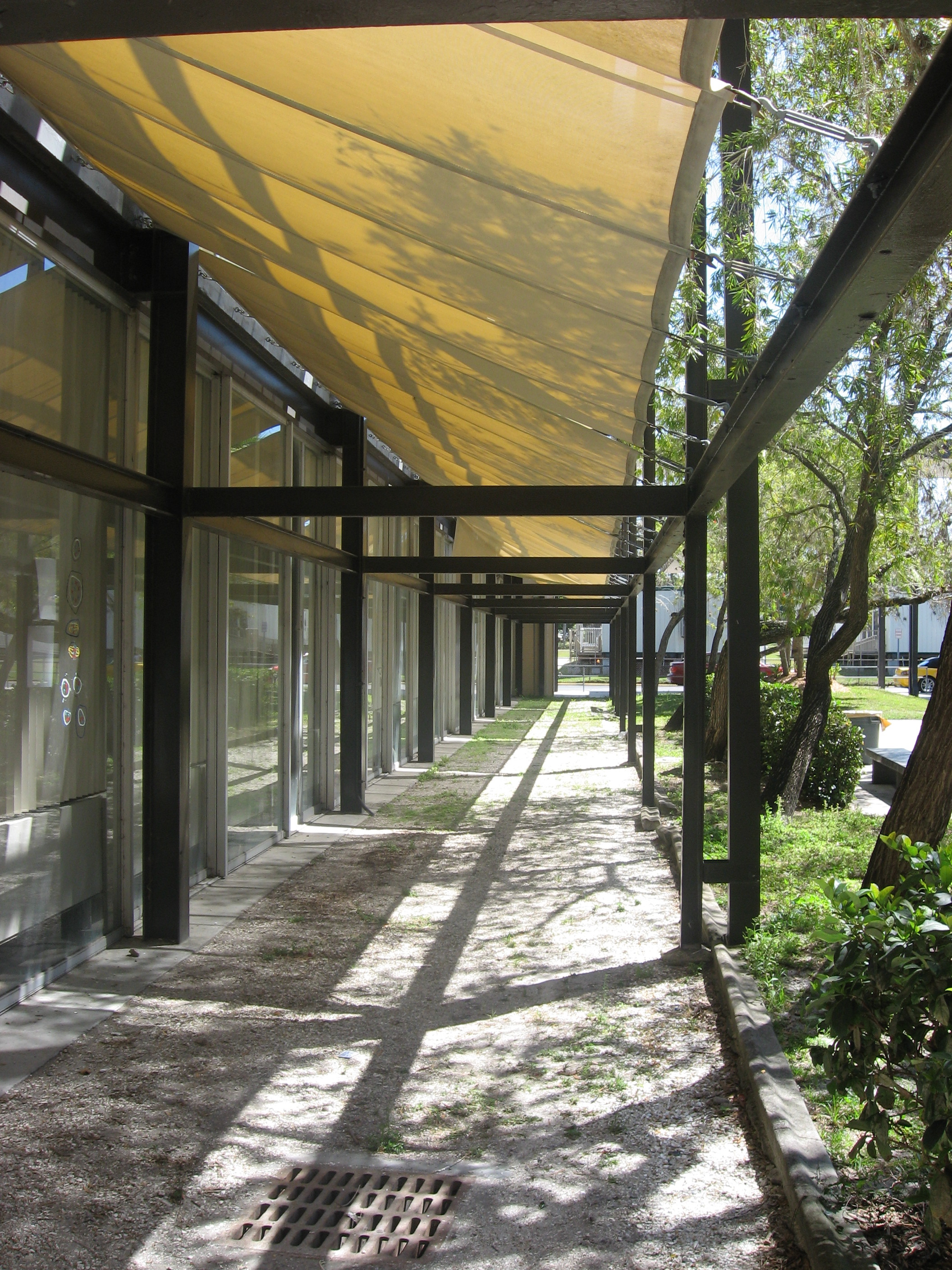
