= List of Alpha Pi Mu chapters =

Alpha Pi Mu is an honor society for Industrial and Systems Engineering students. In all but two cases, chapters of this society are named after each school, and are not given Greek letter designations. Two chapters, at Syracuse and Iowa State, have Greek letter names to recognize previous local societies there.

Following is a list of Alpha Pi Mu chapters. Active chapters are indicated by bold. Inactive chapters are in italics. References cited within each listing or below.

Chapter	Charter date and range	Institution	Location	Status	Ref.
Georgia Tech	January 5, 1949	Georgia Tech	Atlanta, GA	Active	
Virginia Tech	1949	Virginia Tech	Blacksburg, VA	Active	
New York University	1949–1971	New York University	New York City, NY	Inactive	
Ohio State University	1949–202x ?	Ohio State University	Columbus, OH	Inactive	
University of Alabama in Huntsville	1949	University of Alabama in Huntsville	Huntsville, AL	Active	
Pennsylvania State University	1950	Pennsylvania State University	University Park, PA	Active	
Washington University	1950–1965	Washington University in St. Louis	St. Louis, MO	Inactive	
Oklahoma State University	1951	Oklahoma State University–Stillwater	Stillwater, OK	Active	
Phi Alpha Mu	1951–xxxx ?	Syracuse University	Syracuse, NY	Inactive	
Lehigh University	1952	Lehigh University	Bethlehem, PA	Active	
Texas Tech University	1953	Texas Tech University	Lubbock, TX	Active	
University of Tennessee	1954	University of Tennessee	Knoxville, TN	Active	
North Carolina State University	1955	North Carolina State University	Raleigh, NC	Active	
West Virginia University	1955	West Virginia University	Morgantown, WV	Active	
University of Arkansas	1956	University of Arkansas	Fayetteville, AR	Active	
University of Pittsburgh	1956	University of Pittsburgh	Pittsburgh, PA	Active	
Columbia University	1957–20xx ?	Columbia University	New York City, NY	Inactive	
University of California, Berkeley	1957	University of California, Berkeley	Berkeley, CA	Active	
University of Michigan	1957	University of Michigan	Ann Arbor, MI	Active	
Northwestern University	1958–1974	Northwestern University	Evanston, IL	Inactive	
Texas A&M University	1958	Texas A&M University	College Station, TX	Active	
University of Southern California	1958	University of Southern California	Los Angeles, CA	Active	
Lamar University	1959	Lamar University	Beaumont, TX	Active	
Purdue University	1959	Purdue University	West Lafayette, IN	Active	
Northeastern University	1960	Northeastern University	Boston, MA	Inactive	
University of Houston	1960	University of Houston	Houston, TX	Active	
Arizona State University	1962	Arizona State University	Tempe, AZ	Active	
University of Missouri	1963	University of Missouri	Columbia, MO	Active	
Bradley University	1964	Bradley University	Peoria, IL	Active	
New Jersey Institute of Technology	1964	New Jersey Institute of Technology	Newark, NJ	Inactive	
Illinois Institute of Technology	1965–20xx ?	Illinois Institute of Technology	Chicago, IL	Inactive	
University of Massachusetts Amherst	1966	University of Massachusetts Amherst	Amherst, MA	Inactive	
University of Florida	1967	University of Florida	Gainesville, FL	Active	
Auburn University	1968	Auburn University	Auburn, AL	Active	
Cornell University	1968–1968	Cornell University	Ithaca, NY	Inactive	
University of Oklahoma	1968	University of Oklahoma	Norman, OK	Active	
Kansas State University	1969	Kansas State University	Manhattan, KS	Active	
Oregon State University	1969	Oregon State University	Corvallis, OR	Active	
University of Texas at Arlington	1970	University of Texas at Arlington	Arlington, TX	Active	
Mississippi State University	1971	Mississippi State University	Starkville, MS	Active	
University of Toledo	1971	University of Toledo	Toledo, OH		
New Mexico State University	1972	New Mexico State University	Las Cruces, NM	Active	
University of Puerto Rico at Mayagüez	1972	University of Puerto Rico at Mayagüez	Mayagüez, PR	Active	
California Polytechnic State University, San Luis Obispo	1973	California Polytechnic State University, San Luis Obispo	San Luis Obispo, CA	Active	
Louisiana Tech University	1973	Louisiana Tech University	Ruston, LA	Active	
Montana State University	1973	Montana State University	Bozeman, MT	Active	
University of Nebraska–Lincoln	1974	University of Nebraska–Lincoln	Lincoln, NE		
Gamma Epsilon Sigma	1976	Iowa State University	Ames, IA	Active	
University of Illinois	1976	University of Illinois Urbana–Champaign	Urbana, IL	Active	
University of Iowa	1982	University of Iowa	Iowa City, IA	Active	
Northern Illinois University	May 1994	Northern Illinois University	Dekalb, IL	Active	
Florida A&M University–Florida State University	1995	Florida A&M University and Florida State University	Tallahassee, FL	Active	
Binghamton University	19xx ?	Binghamton University	Binghamton, NY	Active	
California State Polytechnic University, Pomona	19xx ?	California State Polytechnic University, Pomona	Pomona, CA	Active	
Clemson University	19xx ?	Clemson University	Clemson, SC	Active	
Kettering University	19xx ?	Kettering University	Flint, MI	Active	
Louisiana State University	19xx ?	Louisiana State University	Baton Rouge, LA	Active	
North Carolina A&T State University	19xx ?	North Carolina A&T State University	Greensboro, NC	Active	
North Dakota State University	19xx ?	North Dakota State University	Fargo, ND	Active	
Ohio University	19xx ?	Ohio University	Athens, OH	Active	
Rensselaer Polytechnic Institute	19xx ?	Rensselaer Polytechnic Institute	Troy, NY	Active	
Rutgers University	19xx ?	Rutgers University	Piscataway, NJ	Active	
South Dakota School of Mines and Technology	19xx ?	South Dakota School of Mines and Technology	Rapid City, SD	Active	
Tennessee Technological University	19xx ?–xxxx ?	Tennessee Tech	Cookeville, TN	Inactive	
University of Central Florida	19xx ?	University of Central Florida	Orlando, FL	Active	
University of Louisville	19xx ?	University of Louisville	Louisville, KY	Active	
University of Miami	19xx ?	University of Miami	Coral Gables, FL	Active	
University of Michigan–Dearborn	19xx ?	University of Michigan–Dearborn	Dearborn, MI	Active	
University of Puerto Rico	19xx ?	University of Puerto Rico, Río Piedras Campus	San Juan, PR	Inactive	
University of San Diego	19xx ?	University of San Diego	San Diego, CA	Active	
University of South Florida	19xx ?	University of South Florida	Tampa, FL	Active	
University of Texas at El Paso	19xx ?	University of Texas at El Paso	El Paso, TX	Active	
University of Washington	19xx ?–xxxx ?; 2022	University of Washington	Seattle, WA	Active	
University of Wisconsin–Madison	19xx ?	University of Wisconsin–Madison	Madison, WI	Active	
University of Wisconsin–Platteville	19xx ?	University of Wisconsin–Platteville	Platteville, WI	Active	
Western Michigan University	19xx ?	Western Michigan University	Kalamazoo, MI	Active	
Wichita State University	19xx ?	Wichita State University	Wichita, KS	Active	
University of South Florida Sarasota–Manatee	xxxx ?	University of South Florida Sarasota–Manatee	Sarasota, FL	Inactive	
Texas A&M University-Commerce	2011	Texas A&M University–Commerce	Commerce, TX	Active	
University of Arizona	xxxx ?	University of Arizona	Tucson, AZ	Active	
Worcester Polytechnic Institute	2013	Worcester Polytechnic Institute	Worcester, MA	Active	
Clarkson University	October 2018	Clarkson University	Potsdam, NY	Active	
Kennesaw State University	2022	Kennesaw State University	Marietta, GA	Active	
