= Chris Hannon =

American football player (born 1984)

No. 15
- Position: Wide receiver

Personal information
- Born: February 18, 1984 (age 42); Sarasota, Florida, U.S.
- Listed height: 6 ft 3 in (1.91 m)
- Listed weight: 205 lb (93 kg)

Career information
- High school: Riverview (Sarasota, Florida)
- College: Tennessee
- NFL draft: 2006: undrafted

Career history
- Kansas City Chiefs (2006); Carolina Panthers (2007–2008)*; San Francisco 49ers (2008); Miami Dolphins (2008); Detroit Lions (2008); Baltimore Ravens (2010)*
- * Offseason or practice squad member only

Christopher Lee Hannon (born February 18, 1984) is an American former football wide receiver. He was signed by the Kansas City Chiefs as an undrafted free agent in 2006. He played college football at Tennessee.

Hannon was also a member of the Carolina Panthers, San Francisco 49ers, Miami Dolphins, Detroit Lions, Baltimore Ravens.

== Early life ==
Hannon attended Riverview High School in Sarasota, Florida and was a student and a letterman in football. In football, he was an Preseason All-America selection by Tom Lemming ... All-District and All-Area by Sarasota Herald-Tribune ... Third-team Class 6A All-State by Florida sportswriters ... Led Riverview to 7-3 record and district title in 2001 ... As junior, ran for 1,000 yards and passed for 800 yards and 18 touchdowns ... His senior campaign, rushed for more than 1,000 yards and passed for another 680 to go with 15 touchdowns ... Best game as senior was 190 rushing yards against East Lake ... Also competed in track and field, with best time of 10.5 seconds in 100M and 21.8 in 200M ... Member of school's Renaissance Club (3.0 grade-point average or higher). Hannon verbally committed to the University of Tennessee on November 10, 2001. Chris Hannon graduated from Riverview High School in 2002.

== College career ==
Hannon then attended the University of Tennessee and majored in communications. His most productive season came as a sophomore in 2004 when he caught 21 passes for 319 yards and seven touchdowns. He finished his collegiate career with 69 receptions for 850 yards and 12 touchdowns. He was the only SEC wideout to catch three touchdown passes in game during 2003 season ... Turned trick against Mississippi State on his first three catches of game ... Three TD catches tied UT game record held by six other players. Hannon also holds the 40 yard dash school record as a receiver with a time of 4.28 seconds.

== Professional career ==
=== Kansas City Chiefs ===
The undrafted Hannon was signed by the Kansas City Chiefs in 2006 and spent time between the practice squad and active roster. He was released following training camp in 2007.

=== Carolina Panthers ===
Hannon spent the 2007 season on the Carolina Panthers' practice squad, and signed a future contract with the team in 2008. He was released by the team during final cuts on August 30.

=== San Francisco 49ers ===
Two days after being released by the Panthers, Hannon was signed to the practice squad of the San Francisco 49ers on September 1, 2008. He was promoted to the active roster on November 29 when the team waived linebacker Ahmad Brooks. Hannon was waived on December 2 when Brooks was re-signed with the intentions of re-signing Hannon days later but Miami claimed him before San Francisco could do so.

=== Miami Dolphins ===
Hannon was claimed off waivers by the Miami Dolphins on December 3, 2008 after guard Justin Smiley was placed on injured reserve. Hannon was inactive for two games with the team before being waived in favor of linebacker Derek Smith on December 22.

=== Detroit Lions ===
After being waived by the Dolphins, Hannon was claimed off waivers by the Detroit Lions on December 23, 2008. The team placed linebacker Jordan Dizon placed on injured reserve to make room for Hannon.

He was waived on June 26, 2009 after suffering a torn hamstring.

=== Baltimore Ravens ===
After spending the 2009 season out of football rehabbing a torn hamstring, Hannon was signed to a future contract by the Baltimore Ravens on January 22, 2010. He was waived on June 10 after re injuring the same hamstring he tore a year earlier.
