= Lake Underwood =

American auto entrepreneur (1926-2008)

Lake Carl Underwood (July 4, 1926 – September 12, 2008) was an American entrepreneur who competed as a champion in the racing of prototype automobiles and motorcycles. He was a master mechanic who, although high performance fuel delivery and carburetor design and mechanics were his specialties, also invented automobile improvements, especially in electronics for German automobiles.

Underwood was one of the founders of the Watkins Glen Racing School where he taught racecar driving skills. He participated in the training of Paul Newman to drive race cars for the 1969 movie, Winning, which sparked Newman's lifetime enthusiasm for the motorsport.

Underwood was an active member of many racing, road racing, and automobile related clubs, some of which he helped to found. He served as president for some of them.

Porsche Club of America identified Underwood as one of four race car drivers who established Porsche as "the giant killer" in the early days of its racing in the United States. Carroll Shelby described him as one of the top ten drivers in the U.S. and in September 2003, Excellence: The Magazine About Porsche, named Lake Underwood as Porsche's Quiet Giant in an extensive article on some of his driving history.

== Biography ==
Underwood was born into the family of mechanical engineers who worked on the heavy water project in the development of nuclear power and in the Manhattan Project. Born and raised in Blue Ridge, Georgia, Underwood served as a flight crew airman in the United States Navy during World War II. After the war he was graduated from Lehigh University.

Underwood opened automobile dealerships in Maplewood, New Jersey, where he dealt with the direct importer of Jaguar, Mercedes-Benz, Porsche, and Volkswagen—Max Hoffman, who was renowned for handshake deals in direct contacts with the manufacturers of the foreign vehicles, rather than the American model of contracts. The dealerships included Essex Sports Cars and Aircooled Automotive, which operated for more than four decades.

Underwood died at the age of 82 at his home in Roseland, New Jersey, on September 12, 2008.

== Racing history ==
Lake Underwood began sports car racing in MGs initially, but soon was piloting a vehicle powered by a Porsche 356 engine loaned to him by the inventor, Ben Shereshaw, who owned a 1952 Porsche Supercar. Porsche factory disk brakes—not used on production vehicles at the time—were adapted for the vehicle by Dick DeBiasse, (the founder of AER Research in Madison, New Jersey) who was able to reduce the weight of the parts without altering their effectiveness, giving the vehicle a distinct competitive advantage.

Before long, managers at Porsche recognized that racing in American circuits could increase sales. They chose Underwood and his team to become the recipients of engineering tips from the factory as well as factory equipment.

Underwood became a founding member of the Northern New Jersey Region chapter of the Porsche Club of America, serving as its second president. By nomination in 1957, he is among the few ever invited to join the Road Racing Drivers Club, serving as its president as well. He maintained friendships with others driving both motorcycles and Porsches, such as Mark Donohue, George Mennen, and Stirling Moss.

Underwood won two F-Production National Championships in 1956 and 1957 with one of the "bathtub" Porsches. Driving a Lister Jaguar, he finished sixth in his class at the 1959 12 Hours of Sebring. After switching to a larger engine in his Porsche in 1963, Underwood won his third F-Production National Championship.

Underwood raced in Class F (F-Production or FP), in SCCA, factory Jaguars, Jaguar D-Types, and Costin Lister Jaguars for Briggs Swift Cunningham II, Porsche 356s, Porsche 550 spyders, and on the Cunningham Team in Porsche 904s and Porsche 906s.

At 12 Hours of Sebring in 1964, Briggs Cunningham and Underwood drove their jointly owned silver Porsche 904 GTS, Number 37, to capture first place in under-2-liter (prototype class) and ninth overall for the race car—during its debut racing season—good photographs of the automobile taken by Bill Kutz are accessible via the external link provided below to the Internet site of racingsportscars.com, which has posted many historic photographs of the automobiles that participated in that event and data of interest to enthusiasts.

In 1965, Underwood raced in 12 Hours of Sebring for the Porsche factory. Co-driver, Günter Klass, and Underwood drove a 904 GT in the race and they won first in under-2-liter GT class, fifth overall, and first overall in the prestigious Index of Performance.

Underwood was following Don Wester when Webster's automobile struck Mario Andretti's at Sebring in 1966 and Underwood had to drive blindly through the tragic accident scene where four spectators were killed after they entered a prohibited area and were struck by Wester's vehicle that Underwood estimated was going 140 miles per hour (230 km/h) at the time.

Driving a Porsche 906 with Ed Hugus, Underwood's final Sebring race garnered fourth place in the Sport Prototype class.

Vehicles Underwood raced are treasured in collections of historic automobiles such as those assembled by collectors such as Collier and Cunningham. They appear in public displays, automobile shows, and among rare and vintage showcases open by invitation.

== Other sports and activities ==
Underwood also was an accomplished all-around sportsman in aviation, boating, hiking, hunting, offshore game fishing, tennis, and skiing. Deep water fishing was a favorite pastime combined with boating. An excellent marksman, he completed his American sheep and mountain goat grand slam while hiking in the high Rockies and in the Alaska Range during the 1960s, before becoming an advocate of conservation, wildlife management, and habitat conservation. He also became a patron of the conservation organization, Friends of Seagate Inc., through his close relationship with its founder, Kafi Benz.

== Racing record ==
=== SCCA National Championship Runoffs ===
Year	Track	Car	Engine	Class	Finish	Start	Status
1956		Porsche 356	Porsche	F Production	1		Running
1957		Porsche 356	Porsche	F Production	1		Running
1963		Porsche 356	Porsche	E Production	1		Running
