= Seagate (Manatee County, Florida) =

Historic house in Florida, United States

- U.S. National Register of Historic Places
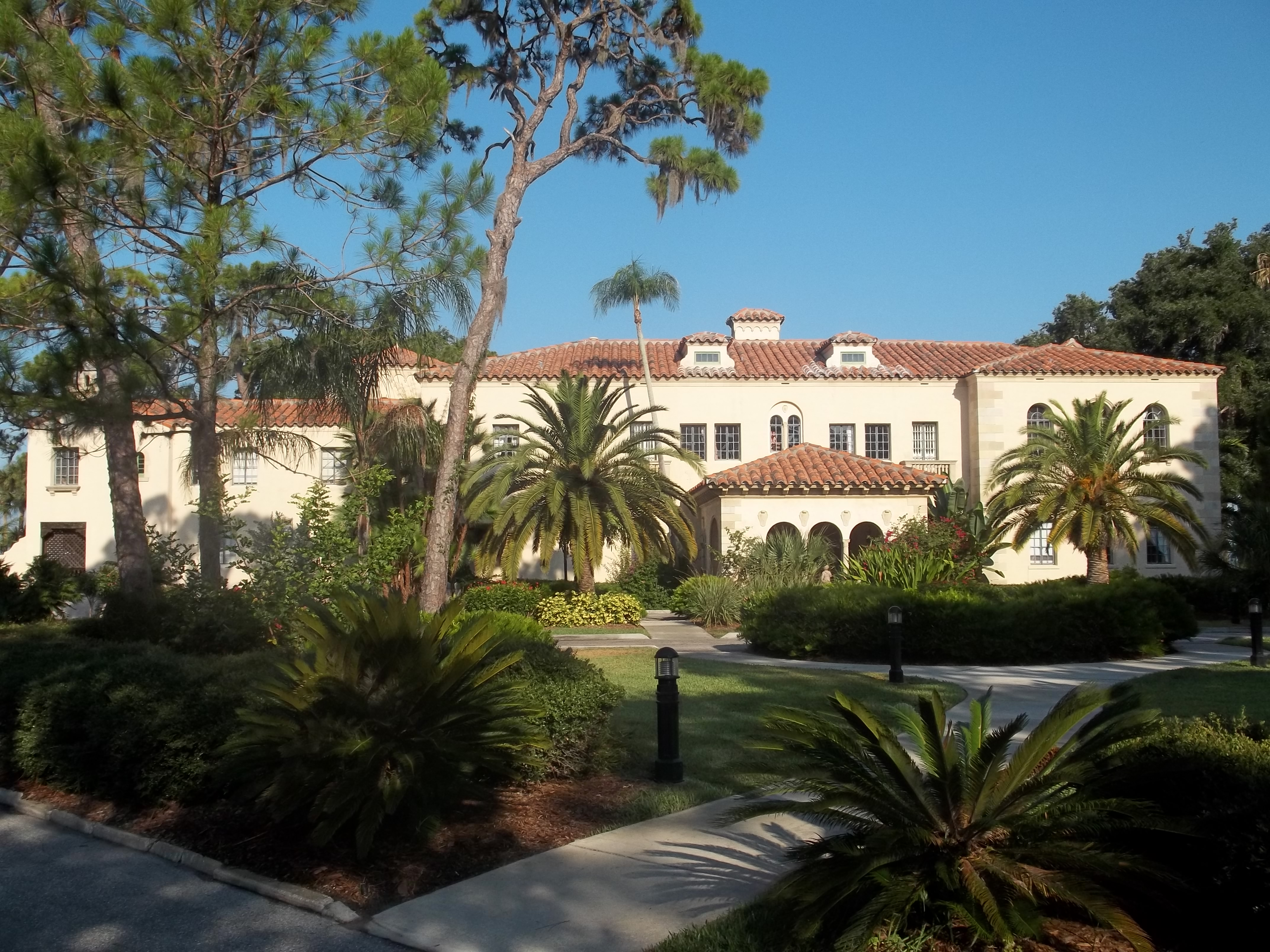
- Seagate

- Location within Florida
- Location: Sarasota, Manatee County, Florida
- Nearest city: Sarasota, Florida
- Coordinates: 27°23′29″N 82°33′52″W
- Area: 45 acres (18 hectares)
- Built: 1929
- Architect: George Albree Freeman Jr.
- Architectural style: Mediterranean Revival
- NRHP reference No.: 83001429
- Added to NRHP: January 21, 1983

Seagate, is located along Sarasota Bay in Manatee County, Florida, and was the former winter estate of Powel Crosley Jr., a noted Cincinnati, Ohio, industrialist and entrepreneur. Crosley had the 11,000-square-foot (1,000 m^{2}), Mediterranean Revival-style home built in 1929 for his wife, Gwendolyn, on 45-acre (18-hectare) of land along Sarasota Bay that was platted in 1925 for a failed subdivision. New York architect George Albree Freeman Jr. designed the home; Ivo A. de Minicis, a Tampa, Florida, architect, drafted the plans; and Paul W. Bergmann, a Sarasota contractor, reportedly built the two-and-a-half-story, cast-stone-and-stucco home in 135 days. Gwendolyn Crosley died at Seagate in 1939. After allowing the Army Air Corps to use the home for airmen who were training at a nearby airbase during World War II, Crosley sold the property in 1947.

Freeman Horton and his wife, Mabel, bought it the following year. Freeman Horton was a civil engineer who proposed the construction of the original Sunshine Skyway Bridge across Tampa Bay. The Horton family lived on the estate from 1948 to 1977. The Campeau Corporation of America acquired the property in the early 1980s, intending to develop it into condominium units and use the residence serving as the development's clubhouse, but its plans failed. The Crosley home and 45 acres (18 hectares) of adjacent property were formally added to the National Register of Historic Places on January 21, 1983.

Friends of Seagate Inc., a local, nonprofit preservation group led efforts to preserve the historic property and its remaining undeveloped land in the late 1980s and early 1990s. The Manatee County, Florida, government purchased the home and 16.5 acres (6.7 hectares) of the property in 1991 for $1.6 million; the State of Florida purchased the estate's remaining 28.4 acres (11.5 hectares) for $2 million for future expansion of the University of South Florida.

The present-day Crosley home and 16.5 acres (6.7 hectares) of land are operated as an event rental property. The university's 28.4-acre (11.5-hectare) tract of land that was part of the former Seagate estate, included in the national register nomination, is the present-day site of the University of South Florida Sarasota-Manatee campus.

== History ==
=== Property location ===
Archaeological studies made at the site in late 1980s/early 1990s suggest that the Calusa inhabited the area during the archaic period. Nearby fresh water access is documented in early plats that may have been constant, since adjacent middens attest to a long period of occupation. Allan Horton, a longtime resident of Manatee County and a former resident of the Seagate estate, described a distinctive structure on the property as a compacted, raised earthen platform that was elevated evenly at 18 inches (46 cm) to 24 inches (61 cm), with a perfectly circular diameter of 32 feet (9.8 m). The structure reportedly resembled the ancient dancing or ceremonial platform that archaeologists had discovered elsewhere in the state. An entrance sign for a drive-in theater, the landmark that Horton used to locate the structure, was demolished on an adjacent parcel, making the potentially ancient structure's location difficult to find. Also, a path for electrical service poles that traversed the area had disturbed an area with mounds nearby, possibly destroying the structure in the process.

The site of the Seagate property was once part of Hillsborough County, Florida, which was established in 1834, following the United States' acquisition of the Florida territory from Spain in 1821. Seagate's location is also associated with Sarasota, Florida, because of its location south of Bowlees Creek, the natural land transportation barrier. Seagate bears a property address and a postal designation of Sarasota; however, when Hillsborough County was subdivided to establish additional counties, governmental oversight for the area went to Manatee County, Florida, which was subsequently subdivided to create more counties, including Sarasota County, Florida, in 1921. The arbitrary line chosen to delineate Manatee County from Sarasota County was drawn at the southern boundary of Seagate and everything to the north remained within Manatee County. Sarasota addresses remain from that line to the creek.

=== Development in 1929 ===
Powel Crosley, Jr. in 1940s advertisement–Sarasota History Center

In 1929, a wealthy industrialist named Powel Crosley Jr. purchased a 63-acre (25-hectare) parcel of bay-front property and had a built a winter retreat along Sarasota Bay for his wife, Gwendolyn B. (Arden) Crosley. The property was the site of a proposed subdivision platted in 1925, but it failed to be developed during the Great Depression. Sea Gate, the subdivision's name was contracted to Seagate over the years, including the name of Seagate Drive, the estate's original driveway, which leads to the Crosley home.

Crosley, a native of Cincinnati, Ohio, was an inventor and entrepreneur, as well as an avid sportsman. His manufacturing companies produced Crosley automobiles, radios, and household appliances. Crosley was also a pioneer in radio broadcasting and a former owner of the Cincinnati Reds major league baseball team. Crosley's wife, Gwendolyn, who suffered from tuberculosis, died at Seagate in 1939. He rarely used the house after her death.

During World War II, Crosley allowed the U.S. Army Air Corps to use the retreat for its airmen who were training at the nearby Sarasota Army Air Base, the now Sarasota-Bradenton International Airport. The home may also have been used as an officers club for a brief period. Crosley sold his estate property in 1947 to the D and D Corporation.

=== Subsequent owners ===
Mabel and Freeman Horton purchased the property in 1948 and owned Seagate for nearly forty years, although the family only lived there until 1977. Freeman Horton was a civil engineer who proposed the construction of the original Sunshine Skyway Bridge across Tampa Bay from Saint Petersburg in Pinellas County through the waters of Hillsborough County to Tiera Ceia in Manatee County. The bridge replaced a ferry service.

In the early 1980s the Campeau Corporation of America, a real estate developer, acquired the property, intending to build a condominium community on the site and use the historic house as a clubhouse. In November 1982 Campeau nominated the house and 45 acres (18 hectares) property for a listing on the National Register of Historic Places. (The listing is unusual because it also included all of the remaining land; most historic listings only include structures.) The property was formally added to the register on January 21, 1983, but the planned real estate project failed when the economy faltered shortly thereafter.

=== Preservation efforts ===
Documentation of a breeding pair of eagles in a registered nest on the Seagate property

Seagate was saved from commercial development by the efforts of adjacent residents including Kafi Benz, who opposed several ensuing proposals for development. Benz founded Friends of Seagate Inc. (a local, nonprofit preservation organization) and initiated a campaign for Seagate's preservation. Benz and her group also began a fundraising effort for its acquisition. In addition, Benz published an illustrated guide to Seagate in 1988.

In 1991, the Manatee County Commission paid $1.6 million for 16.5 acres (6.7 hectares) of the original subdivision along the bay front that contained the structures built in 1929 for Crosley and his wife with the intention of preserving and renovating the estate. The University of South Florida purchased the remaining 28.4 acres (11.5 hectares) for $2 million as a site for future expansion of the satellite campus. After New College of Florida separated from the University of South Florida in 2001, the satellite campus for the Tampa-based university vacated the New College campus on the nearby Edith Ringling estate and built a separate campus of its own on the eastern portion of the Seagate property. The University of South Florida Sarasota-Manatee campus opened its new facilities in August 2006.

== Present-day use ==
The historic Seagate residence, called the Powel Crosley Estate, is used as a meeting, conference, and event venue. The bay-front estate is supported, in part, by fundraising through the Crosley Estate Foundation, a nonprofit charitable corporation. In a re-separation of New College from the University of South Florida, the satellite campus for the Tampa-based university was removed from the original New College campus on the nearby Edith Ringling estate and a solo campus was created on the eastern portion of the Seagate property for use by the University of South Florida alone.

The University of South Florida Sarasota-Manatee's campus on the former Seagate property includes a three-story, 134,540-square-foot (12,499 m^{2}) building on a 28.4-acre (11.5-hectare) parcel of land, in addition to facilities in other nearby locations.

== Description ==
The Crosely's Mediterranean Revival-style house, auxiliary garages, and living quarters for staff were designed by New York architect George Albree Freeman Jr., while Ivo A. de Minicis, a Tampa, Florida, architect, drafted the plans. The 45-acre (18-hectare) property in the southwest corner of mainland Manatee County included the 11,000-square-foot (1,000 m^{2}) house with its porte-cochere entry, flagstone patio and walkways, a swimming pool, fountains, a seaplane dock, and a yacht basin. Some reports stated that Paul W. Bergmann, a Sarasota contractor, built the two-and-a-half-story, cast stone and stucco home for the Crosleys in 135 days. The home served as a "fish camp", used mostly in the winter, but staff would remain throughout the year. The home is reportedly the first residence built in Florida using steel-frame construction to provide protection against fires and hurricanes.

Significant elements of the house, which includes ten bedrooms and ten bathrooms, are its cross-axis design and a circular tower that contains a second-story, teak-lined study, dubbed the "Ship Room", with metal oculi. Other major features include double louvered and screened pocket doors and transoms to provide privacy while allowing the natural flow of sea breezes to cool the house through window and door grilles and rejas; an intercom system wired into the walls of the house and servant quarters; electrical wiring under the terra cotta floor tiles to provide electric power for lamps; chamfered, polychrome-stenciled pecky cypress beams; galleon carvings on the loggia; massive carved doors and woodwork (designed and installed by the Zoller Lumber Company); tiled patterns on the interior floors and the main staircase; plaster ornamentation; and stained glass of ochre and lavender, randomly placed in casement and French windows.

Crosley had a deep path dredged from the center of Sarasota Bay to a berth that accommodated his yachts, which included the 76-foot (23 m) Argo, and the seaplane in which the Crosleys regularly used to fly to Sarasota from Cincinnati and to other locations. Tide level indicators were built into the walls of the berth, which remains as a current aspect of the property. A wind indicator, which moved around the ceiling of his second-story study, alerted Crosley to changes in wind conditions outdoors. It was driven by a weathervane atop the home's tower. The circular tower's bank of windows provides a broad vista overlooking the bay.

The University of South Florida Sarasota-Manatee now occupies a 28.4-acre (11.5-hectare) parcel of the Seagate property along Tamiami Trail (US-41) that was not part of the 1982 nomination of the estate to the National Register that only indicated the existing buildings, but the land was added to the 1983 listing due to the significant civil engineering that Crosley designed for drainage, dredging and filling, marine structures, and a yacht basin containing a tide level gauge.
