= Gainor Roberts =

American painter (1941–2020)

Gainor Elizabeth Roberts (September 14, 1941 – March 26, 2020) was an American artist known for her still life and landscape paintings that explore color, forms, and symbolism. A classically trained artist in the realist tradition, Roberts used impressionist brush techniques and intense color. She worked in egg tempera, oil, pastel, watercolor, and monotype. She also was a graphic designer, a web designer, and a sculptor.

In addition to teaching classes in drawing, painting, and photography, Roberts wrote monographs on design and painting techniques as well as booklets and instruction manuals. She was a well-known artist and spokesperson for the visual arts in Tampa Bay, Florida.

Apple, from the Genesis Series by Gainor E. Roberts, 2007

== Life ==
Born and raised in Philadelphia, Gainor Elizabeth Roberts had an early interest in art that was discouraged by her upper-middle-class Quaker family. She was exposed to art due to her great-great-aunt, Ellen Wetherald Ahrens, a well-known Victorian-era artist who had studied with Howard Pyle and Thomas Eakins. While Roberts often skipped school to create artwork at home, she had no formal training in art until age 18. Her family would not permit her to enter college as an art major. Instead she attended a summer program taught by the portrait and figure painter, Robert Brackman, whose emphasis on classical technique and color was a defining influence upon her. Roberts studied with Brackman in the summers while attending Elmira College as an English major. After graduation from Elmira, Roberts studied painting at the Art Students League of New York in Manhattan. Later she worked as a graphic artist.

In the mid-1970s, she became staff graphic artist at Mystic Seaport. For almost a decade Roberts and her husband, George Cranston, traveled around the country, living first on a 31-foot sailing sloop and then in an Airstream RV trailer. During this period, she had little opportunity for painting. In the late 1980s she returned to school in order to refresh her skills. Roberts studied at the National Academy of Design in Manhattan with Mary Beth McKenzie and James Childs, and at Lyme Academy of Fine Arts in Old Lyme, Connecticut with Deane Keller. She also took workshops with Aaron Shikler. In addition, Roberts studied sculpture at Lyme Academy with Laci de Gerenday.

In the 1990s, Roberts began creating works in monotype and moved to Westerly, Rhode Island, where she and another artist, Sandi Gold, ran their own gallery. In 2001 Roberts moved to Zephyrhills, Florida. For several years, she was Art Curator of the Carrollwood Cultural Center in Tampa. She exhibited in several venues in the greater Tampa area and taught classes as well as private students.

A search committee headed by Virginia Laudano, of the Art Club of Sun City Center, invited Roberts and Kafi Benz to judge its thirty-sixth annual art show held during February 2003. The center was among the locations where Roberts taught many classes.

Her husband died in 2009.

Roberts was a member of North Tampa Arts League, The Exhibiting Society of Artists (TESA), The Egg Tempera Society, and the National League of American Pen Women. She was an honorary and letters member of the New England Monotype Guild.

== Egg tempera and Genesis Series ==
In 2003, Roberts began experimenting with the demanding medium of egg tempera. She was drawn to it because of the luminous color, still visible in medieval and early Renaissance masterworks. Roberts wrote a monograph on the technique and taught master classes in egg tempera.

Inspiration, from the Feeling Series, by Gainor E. Roberts, 2011

The Genesis Series, the best known series of egg tempera paintings by Roberts, represent a high point of her use of color and form to layer meaning into her work. The small (typically 6” x 8”) paintings are studies of organic form. All show the ovary of a fruit or vegetable, focusing on the seeds.

== Feeling series ==
Roberts worked for more than 25 years on her Feeling Series, twelve oil paintings that represent personal emotions. Started in the 1990s, during the artist's recovery period from alcoholism, the paintings initially were therapeutic, to help Roberts break through a creative block. She continued to explore this inner territory through additional paintings, as a way of objectifying what she considered to be private experiences. The works show arrangements of objects within a restricted color palette. Traditional tropes, such as flowers and musical instruments, are repeated and varied; Roberts used them as wordplay, metaphor, and symbol. At the time of her death, the artist had completed all except the last painting in the series, Laughter.

== See also ==
- Pencoyd (Bala Cynwyd, Pennsylvania)

== General references ==
"Still-Life Painting in Northern Europe, 1600–1800," The Metropolitan Museum of Art, Heilbrunn Timeline of Art History, http://www.metmuseum.org/toah/hd/nstl/hd_nstl.htm; accessed Nov. 10, 2013
