= Kafi Benz =

American artist (born 1941)

Kafi Benz (born 1941) is an American author and artist who began participation in social entrepreneurship through environmental preservation and regional planning in 1959 as a member of the Jersey Jetport Site Association, which opposed plans by the New York Port Authority to found a new airport in the Great Swamp, the central feature of a massive 55-square-mile watershed in New Jersey bounded to the south and east by the Watchung Mountains, 30 miles west of Manhattan.

During the 1980s, she also became very active in historic preservation, founding a nonprofit 501(c)(3) organization, Friends of Seagate Inc., for that purpose. The organization later was expanded to include concerns for additional areas in the arts and sciences. At the same time, she founded the official web site of the sculptor Jim Gary. In 2001, it was moved to another web site she created and planned to be able to feature other artists as well, Kafi Benz Productions.

== Early life ==
Born during 1941 in Chatham, New Jersey, her mother was a commercial artist, graphic designer, and illustrator and her father was a prominent physician and surgeon who also was chief of staff at a hospital in Morristown, president of several medical societies, and trustee of the state medical association.

== Initial environmental conservation ==
The Jersey Jetport Site Association was a small, but effective conservation organization, circumventing the efforts of the Port Authority to replace Newark Airport with a much larger complex farther to the west. After infiltrating meetings of the powerful authority headed by Austin J. Tobin, that were held to marshal support among construction companies and unions, the members of the association distributed opposition literature and drew public attention to its efforts. Greater opposition arose among the residents of the massive area that would be affected once the issue was revealed by coverage of the expulsion of four of the JJSA members (Kafi Benz, Joan Kelly, Esty Weiss, and Betty White) from a meeting at a Newark hotel, the Essex House, in a local newspaper, the Newark Evening News, on Thursday, December 3, 1959. Coverage quickly included publications such as the New York Times.

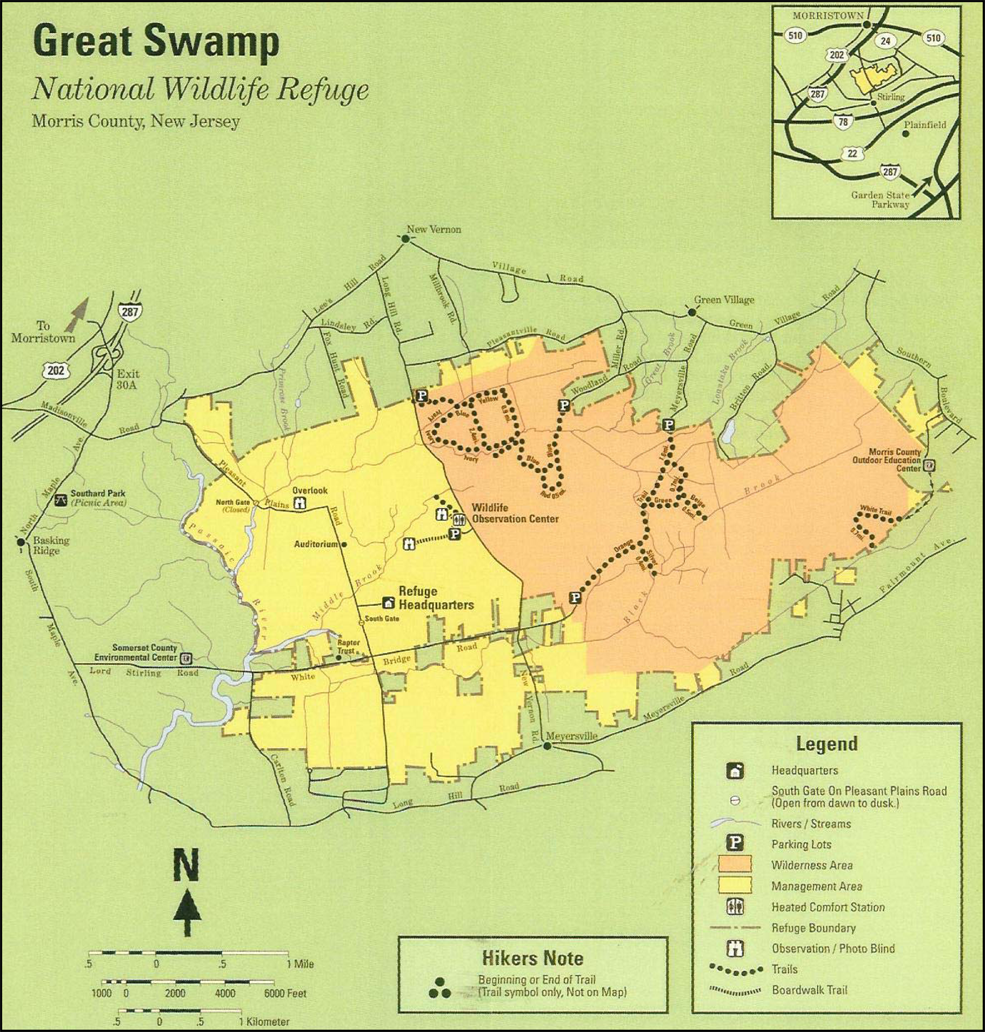
The Great Swamp National Wildlife Refuge – 7,600 acres, almost 12 square miles (31 km^{2})

The JJSA was closely followed by a sister organization, a new sub-committee founded in Washington, D.C. within the North American Wildlife Foundation, and these combined efforts led quickly to the establishment of the park that would become the Great Swamp National Wildlife Refuge by an act of Congress on Thursday, November 3, 1960. Residents such as Geraldine R. Dodge and Marcellus Hartley Dodge, Sr. contributed the funds necessary to purchase the core of the swamp as the legal opposition progressed into a victory for the preservationists that led to the perpetual protection of the important natural habitat. Along with providing the funds to seek other donors, the influence of such prominent residents opened doors to legislators. Marcellus Dodge also was instrumental in establishing dialogue with established conservation groups.

The initial donation of land to the federal government as a park was 2,600 acres (11 km^{2}). The park now consists of 7,600 acres (31 km^{2}) or almost 12 square miles of varied habitats. It was declared a National Natural Landmark in 1966 and given wilderness status in 1968.

During the final period of the founding of the park, United States Secretary of the Interior Stewart Lee Udall headed the federal department that was in charge of parks. He supported the efforts of these conservationists and commented that he believed they mounted the greatest effort ever made by residents in America to protect a natural habitat. Several national news magazines also noted the success the tiny organization achieved.

In 2023, her home town named a room of a new municipal community center in one of its historic buildings to honor Benz for her role in the effort to protect the Great Swamp.

== Fine arts activities ==
In the late 1960s, Benz became a director of the Somerset Art Association, then located in Bernardsville, New Jersey, exhibited fine art, and participated in the planning and administration of its annual competitive regional art show. The organization has been renamed as, The Center for Contemporary Art (CCA), is located in Bedminster, and is noted as a regional art center with a comprehensive studio art school, professional exhibition program, and a community outreach component. Her painting and sculpture works are held in private collections in several states. Occasionally sitting as a model for sculpture classes taught at the association by Berta Margoulies (a 1946 Guggenheim fellowship recipient), many sculptures of Benz have been exhibited by these students. At that time a friendship with sculptor Jim Gary developed that would lead to her representing the sculptor at many times, eventually becoming his publicist, creating and maintaining the official web site for Gary and his work, and becoming the director of his studio, Jim Gary's Twentieth Century Dinosaurs, marketing and placing his works and exhibition.

When Gary died in January 2006, Benz established a memorial fund and led efforts to bring about the placement of sculptures from his traveling exhibition, as a single collection in a suitable museum or institution where the sculptures in the collection would remain open to the public. By 2009, negotiations with a site in Sarasota seemed assured and much publicity ensued, through 2010. That contract was not executed, however, and negotiations were redirected successfully to a museum in Tallahassee.

In August 2011, twenty-one Gary sculptures were packed into vans and moved from Colts Neck, New Jersey for a ten-year display at the Tallahassee Museum in Florida. When National Geographic Magazine was unable to meet the schedule, Benz invited three free-lance photographers to document the preparations and complex move with videos and still photographs.

She represented painter Lee W. Hughes also, principally while he was a transparent watercolor artist, with a studio and gallery in Mendham, New Jersey. She also represented his wife and her longtime friend, pencil medium artist Sue Hughes (née McQuillan), while she was working out of a studio in New Jersey and later, in California.

A search committee headed by Virginia Laudano, of the Art Club of Sun City Center, invited Kafi Benz to judge its thirty-sixth annual art show held during February 2003 jointly with the prominent Tampa Bay area multi-media artist, Gainor Roberts. Soon thereafter, Benz participated in a project with transparent watercolor artist, John Crawford, to publish his research of an early Renoir painting of Marie Le Coeur, that was among his art collection since its acquisition in Chicago during the 1930s. He is the namesake of the John Crawford Art Education Studio that was created after his death at SouthShore Regional Library of Hillsborough County, which now features many of his own paintings. The planned book was not published before his death.

== Murals and film ==
Among several positions working with Denise Kowal, the founder of the Sarasota Chalk Festival, in 2012, Benz became the manager of its mural committee, ‘’Going Vertical’’, locating sites and co-ordinating the work of the international artists who performed their work as muralists on buildings in the region as part of the festival. During this time she developed a relationship with the French graffiti artist, MTO, that eventually, led to Benz being identified by him as the curator for several of the murals he later created independently.

During the festival of 2012, MTO had become the subject of intense focus in the community because of curious interpretations of some of his murals, that grew into a veritable polarized controversy, perpetuated by those projecting those unsupported interpretations. The controversy raged on for months and led to the destruction of the huge mural that provoked it, dubbed Fast Life (although it was intended as Fat Lie). In response to the controversy and removal, additional murals were created in the area by MTO through "Going Vertical" and private funding, two of which were facilitated by Benz.

Benz became the co-translator and narrator of a documentary film MTO created about his perspective of the saga and the murals he painted in response to various stages of it, as they unfolded. The film, FL: unpremeditated movie, was released in March 2013.

Later in 2013, MTO returned to Sarasota during his next painting tour throughout the United States. At that time, he executed a mural that is more than two stories tall, Florida, Mon Amour..., on the northern wall of The Players theatre that was located on Tamiami Trail and opposite the Municipal Auditorium in Sarasota. He designated Benz as curator of that mural.

== Return to preservation ==
During the 1980s, Benz became active in environmental and historic preservation in Sarasota, Florida. She joined the Sarasota Alliance for Historic Preservation, Inc. shortly after Veronica Morgan founded the organization in 1984, and has served in several positions among its officers as well as being a director of the organization over the years. Kafi Benz and Dudley E. DeGroot conducted archaeological research to document historical and prehistorical aspects of two endangered properties that were listed on the National Register of Historic Places—the El Vernona Hotel (built by Owen Burns in 1925 and later renamed to John Ringling Hotel) and Seagate (a fishing retreat built for Gwendolyn and Powel Crosley Jr. in 1929) during efforts to protect the historic properties from demolition. Jerris Foote participated in both projects.

Toward the end of the decade, Benz participated in documentation of other archaeological and historical sites. She was cited as a special contributor to the survey of archaeological, historical, cultural, and natural resources in the coastal areas of Sarasota County that was conducted by the Florida department of environmental regulation, as well as for recommending sites deserving further research.

Powel Crosley, Jr. circa 1949 - Sarasota County History Center

In the late 1980s, Benz founded Friends of Seagate Inc., which championed the preservation of the remaining portions of Seagate, a subdivision platted in 1925 that became the Crosleys' estate in 1929. The property was sold to the Horton family in 1948, and was purchased in the late 1970s for development into a club-based condominium project by the Campeau Corporation. Although the property had been listed on the National Register of Historic Places in 1982, little protection is afforded through listing and Benz's concerns were for both historic preservation and environmental conservation. Unfortunately, the condominium market in Florida had collapsed shortly after Campeau acquired the property and the ambitious plans to use the 1929 home and auxiliary buildings as the clubhouse and headquarters of the development were never realized. Work permits were kept alive by intermittent, but unrelated and minimal construction by Ron Royal until the corporation began to collapse. That collapse led to the demise of many of the most prestigious department stores in America—such as Bonwit Teller—having been acquired by the failing Federated Department Stores division that had become part of Campeau.

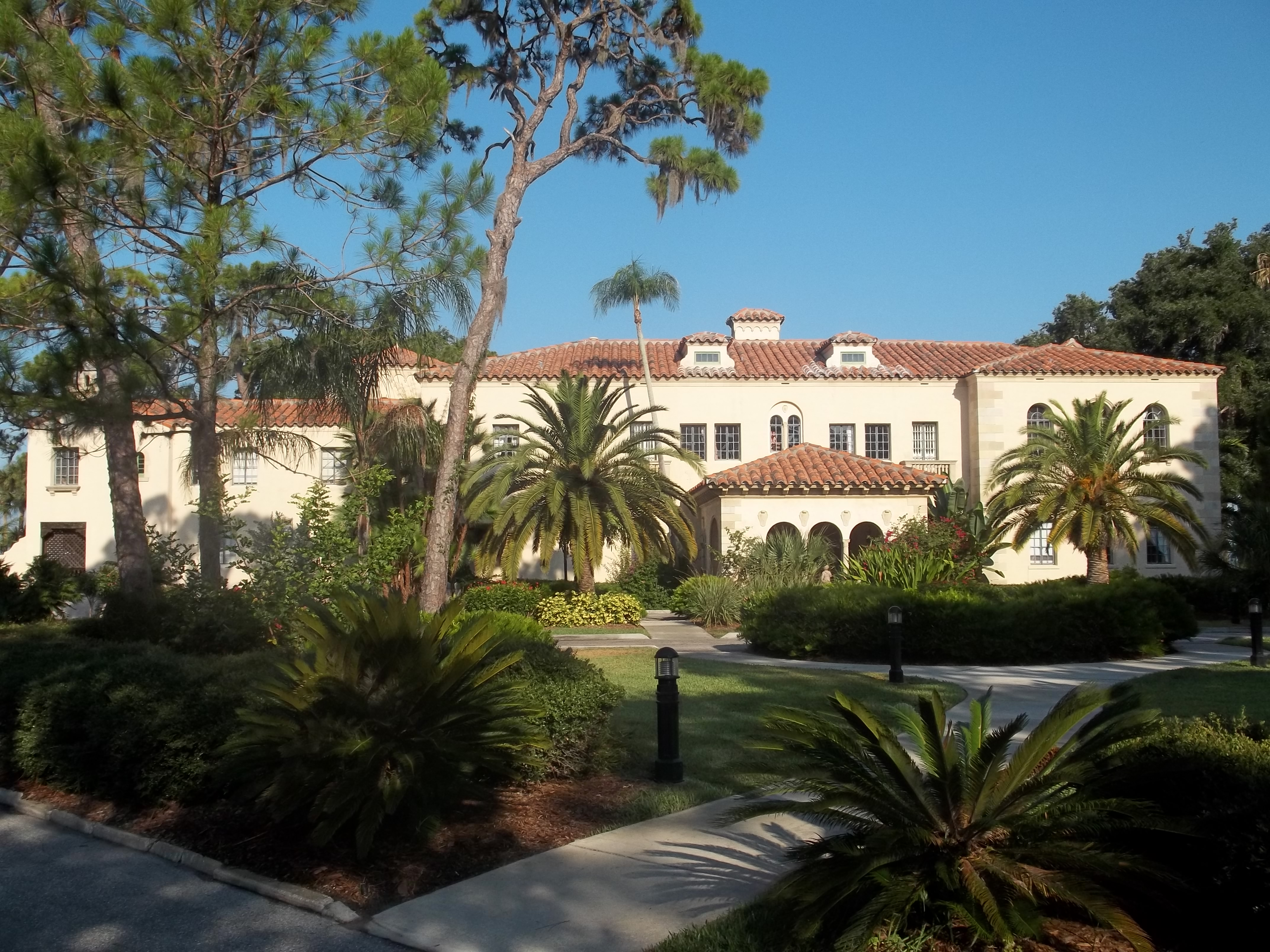
Seagate - eastern elevation of the 1929 house built as a fishing retreat

The Seagate property changed hands several times with several inglorious plans submitted for redevelopment that met with opposition until Friends of Seagate was founded and Benz's campaign for acquisition was begun, that resulted finally, in public acquisition. In 1990 the property was acquired by the state of Florida with a division into two portions, the bay front residence and 16 acres (6.5 ha) being overseen by Manatee County and the much larger, eastern portion of the property along Tamiami Trail being overseen by New College and University of South Florida until their separation and the resulting development of this portion into a new campus only for the satellite, commuter campus of the university.

Following the public acquisition of the property, the objectives of Benz's organization were expanded to broader preservation issues involving archaeological, artistic, cultural, environmental, and historical aspects of the region. Lake Underwood, a patron to Friends of Seagate, provided much of the funding and equipment for the expansion of the organization.

Rus-in-Ur'be – marble plaque inset into a column of the main entrance, one of three original gateways to the property; roughly, it may be translated as, country in the city

In 2002, Benz also led Friends of Seagate Inc. in its commitment as the nonprofit environmental entity to hold land in a partnership with the Sarasota municipal government as the eligible local governmental entity, applying for a state grant for funding through the Florida Forever Program, (Florida's premier conservation and recreation lands acquisition program) amounting to $1,505,625 for acquisition of Rus in Ur'be, a large land parcel in the center of the Indian Beach Sapphire Shores neighborhood, as a neighborhood park. The parcel includes more than 11 acres (4.5 ha) and contained a great deal of wooded and undeveloped land, wetlands, a tennis court, and a Sarasota School of Architecture structure that served as a private clubhouse or recreational lounge for a bay front home opposite it on Bay Shore Road that had been sold separately from the house and held for a long time by a developer. The clubhouse was roofed with glazed blue Japanese ceramic tiles, used pecky cypress timbers for framing, and had expansive glass partitions along the western elevation, facing the tennis courts. The project retained its status among those not able to be included for state funding in that cycle, but was sold for private development before the next cycle began. The structure was demolished and the tennis courts destroyed, plats for development with single family homes were surveyed, and a private road paved through the parcel, but no structures were built prior to the downturn of the real estate market as the speculation boom of the 1990s and 2000s collapsed. Several development projects have been proposed for the parcel. The property remained undeveloped through the next decade and often was identified as a likely location for a neighborhood park as other efforts continued. In 2014 the property was acquired out of foreclosure and became destined for residential development.

An initiative to give Florida voters the opportunity to decide whether they desire to have a state constitutional amendment regarding clean waters placed on the ballot was launched in 2023, the Florida Right To Clean Water. The initiative arose from a county charter that previously had passed by more than 89% in a local government election, but then had been undermined by state legislation preventing "home rule" that was designed to counter the ability of the county to follow the mandate by its voters. Some of those who had led the campaign for the county charter amendment extended the effort by pursuing a state constitution amendment that would overcome the suppression and additionally, extend a right to clean waters throughout the state. Benz recommended a change to the logo and provided her design for the new campaign. She also volunteered to serve as a local captain in the initiative.

== Planning ==
Interest in regional and local planning led Benz to participate in community planning projects, as well as the designs for the campuses of both New College and the University of South Florida Sarasota-Manatee. She became a director of Indian Beach Sapphire Shores, a large and active neighborhood association and assumed a leadership role in the community and many organizations related to community issues.

She was appointed as a local government official to represent Sarasota County while serving on the federally mandated Sarasota-Manatee Metropolitan Planning Organization Citizen Advisory Committee, where she has served for many years, including as its chair, a member of its executive committee, and its delegate to the regional committee of the chairs of all MPOs within western central Florida, encompassing eight counties, the Chairs Coordinating Committee.

The establishment of MPOs throughout the nation as an aspect of local government in the United States was mandated by congressional legislation. Depending upon the area, the governance of an MPO may be planning for a single community, county-wide, multiple or bi-county-wide, or regional. The area of an MPO may cross other established jurisdictional lines of government. By federal law, any urbanized area with a population exceeding 50,000 is required to form an MPO to guide transportation planning in the metropolitan area. MPOs are funded by the federal government in conjunction with additional funds contributed by the state and local governments of the regions in which they are formed. The need for larger regional transportation planning co-operation has driven the establishment of additional agencies within the MPO structure, such as the Chairs Coordinating Committee, with much larger focus to draw the officials from the MPO organizations in many regions into the national effort to integrate transportation planning more effectively.

After studying the work of the road engineering expert, Michael Wallwork, in the late 1980s she initiated the examination of a new design for road intersections, the modern roundabout, by the MPO and both county and city governments and has continued to advocate its application for the elimination of unnecessary deaths and serious injuries at conventional intersections, improving the environmental and beautification aspects of community designs, and because counterintuitively, they improve congestion issues by carrying larger volumes of traffic than conventional intersection designs.

Decades later, the federal highway standards now support the use of true modern roundabouts and some states have begun requiring road planners to defend any proposal lacking this innovative intersection design. Insurance companies now advocate it as well, to reduce fatalities and injuries, and to prevent extensive damage to automobiles at intersection crashes.

== Publications and other professional activities ==
Contributions by Benz to publications of organizations to which she has belonged include articles, design and layout, illustrations, and editing. Internet contributions include public relations and communications as well as web page design, editing, management, and publication for several of the organizations. She also has published privately many short stories, some of which include her own illustrations. Some have appeared in commercial media. The great majority of her published works are devoted to natural history, but some are devoted to history, biography, and historic preservation as well, featuring illustrations and details of the subject people and structures. Brochures and fliers she created on the latter topics have been distributed to encourage historic preservation and made available by local government and institutions owning the historical structures.

Professional experience for Kafi Benz has included commercial art, graphic design, and illustration; marketing, public relations, and corporate image development; real estate development; medical research publication and editing for a Fortune-100 ethical pharmaceutical corporation, Ciba-Geigy, now Novartis, that ranks highly in the multinational pharmaceutical industry; legal and technical editing and publication of the issuances of the Nuclear Regulatory Commission, a regulatory agency of the federal government; ghost and speech writing; and electronic engineering product development for the second generation of early personal computers by Litton Industries.
