= 1957 SCCA National Sports Car Championship =

Seasons
- ← 1956 1958 →

The 1957 SCCA National Sports Car Championship season was the seventh season of the Sports Car Club of America's National Sports Car Championship. It began May 19, 1957, and ended November 17, 1957, after fifteen races.

== Classes ==
Class	Modified	Production
B	over 5000cc	3500-5000cc
C	3000-5000cc	2700-3500cc
D	2000-3000cc	2000-2700cc
E	1500-2000cc	1600-2000cc
F	1100-1500cc	1300-1600cc
G	750-1100cc	750-1300cc
H	500-750cc	under 750cc

== Schedule ==
Rnd	Race	Length^{A}	Circuit	Location	Date
1	Cumberland Sports Car Races	1 hour	Greater Cumberland Regional Airport	Wiley Ford, West Virginia	May 19
2	National Championship Sports Car Road Races	60 mi (97 km)	Eagle Mountain National Guard Base	Fort Worth, Texas	June 2
3	Lime Rock National Championship Sports Car Races	100 km (62 mi)	Lime Rock Park	Lakeville, Connecticut	June 9
4	Road America National Championships Races	150 mi (240 km)	Road America	Elkhart Lake, Wisconsin	June 23
5	Marlboro National Sports Car Races	43 mi (69 km)	Marlboro Motor Raceway	Upper Marlboro, Maryland	July 14
6	Inaugural Grand Prix Sports Car Races	100 km (62 mi)	Virginia International Raceway	Danville, Virginia	August 4
7	Montgomery National Championships Races	150 km (93 mi)	Montgomery Airport	Montgomery, New York	August 18
8	Thompson National Championship Races	1 hour	Thompson International Speedway	Thompson, Connecticut	September 2
9	Road America 500	500 mi (800 km)	Road America	Elkhart Lake, Wisconsin	September 8
10	Watkins Glen Grand Prix	100 mi (160 km)	Watkins Glen International	Watkins Glen, New York	September 21
11	Bridgehampton Inaugural Races	70 mi (110 km)	Bridgehampton Race Circuit	Bridgehampton, New York	September 29
12	President's Cup Race	2 hours, 30 minutes	Virginia International Raceway	Danville, Virginia	October 27
13	National Palm Springs Championship Road Race	85 mi (137 km)	Palm Springs Municipal Airport	Palm Springs, California	November 3
14	Pebble Beach Races	100 mi (160 km)	Laguna Seca Raceway	Monterey, California	November 10
15	Riverside National Championship Sports Car Races	150 km (93 mi)	Riverside International Raceway	Riverside, California	November 17

^A Feature race

== Season results ==
Feature race overall winners in bold.

Rnd	Circuit	BS Winning Team	BP Winning Team	CS Winning Team	CP Winning Team	DS Winning Team	DP Winning Team	ES Winning Team	EP Winning Team	FS Winning Team	FP Winning Team	GS Winning Team	GP Winning Team	HS Winning Team	Results
Rnd	Circuit	BS Winning Driver(s)	BP Winning Driver(s)	CS Winning Driver(s)	CP Winning Driver(s)	DS Winning Driver(s)	DP Winning Driver(s)	ES Winning Driver(s)	EP Winning Driver(s)	FS Winning Driver(s)	FP Winning Driver(s)	GS Winning Driver(s)	GP Winning Driver(s)	HS Winning Driver(s)	Results
1	Cumberland	#271 J. E. Rose	#11 Lindsay Hopkins	#59 Briggs Cunningham	#235 Leonard E. Butscher	**#8 John Edgar**	#204 John K. Colgate, Jr.	#98 Scuderia Rosinante	#120 Bob Kuhn	#0 Jack Pry	#37 Lake Underwood	#35 Frank W. Baptista	#213 William M. Speer	#195 Richard W. Gent	Results
1	Cumberland	(United States) J. E. Rose	(United States) Dick Thompson	(United States) Walt Hansgen	(United States) Charles Butscher	**(United States) Carroll Shelby**	(United States) John Colgate	(United States) Bruce Kessler	(United States) Bob Kuhn	(United States) Charles Wallace	(United States) Lake Underwood	(United States) Frank Baptista	(United States) Ed Hugus	(United States) Melvin Sachs	Results
2	Eagle Mountain	#65 Chevrolet	**#11 Chevrolet**	#36 Jaguar	^{A}	#111 Ferrari	#129 Austin-Healey	no entries	#26 A.C.-Bristol	#23 Porsche	#41 Porsche	#52 Cooper-Climax	#4 Alfa Romeo	#54 Bandini	Results
2	Eagle Mountain	(United States) J. E. Rose	**(United States) Dick Thompson**	(United States) Bob Stonedale	^{A}	(United States) Jim Roberts	(United States) Dave Furrows	no entries	(United States) Richard McGuire	(United States) John Max Wolf	(United States) William Randle	(United States) Tom Johnson	(United States) Val Scroggie	(United States) Gordon Wright	Results
3	Lime Rock	no entries	#114 Chevrolet	#61 Briggs Cunningham	#1 Jaguar	**#8 John Edgar**	#73 Austin-Healey	#103 Ferrari	#6 Morgan	#0 Porsche	#37 Porsche	#35 Lotus	#24 Alfa Romeo	#4 PBX	Results
3	Lime Rock	no entries	(United States) Bark Henry	(United States) John Fitch	(United States) Jack Crusoe	**(United States) Carroll Shelby**	(United States) Fred Moore	(United States) Bruce Kessler	(Switzerland) Gaston Andrey	(United States) Charles Wallace	(United States) Lake Underwood	(United States) Frank Baptista	(United States) John Clapp	(United States) Dolph Vilardi	Results
4	Road America	#98 Nash-Healey	#155 Chevrolet	**#60 Briggs Cunningham**	#11 Mercedes-Benz	#150 Ferrari	#166 Austin-Healey	#6 Ferrari	#151 A.C.-Bristol	#37 Porsche	#43 Porsche	#35 Lotus	#124 Alfa Romeo	#106 TXP	Results
4	Road America	(United States) Andy Rosenberger	(United States) Jim Jeffords	**(United States) Walt Hansgen**	(United States) Rees Makins	(United States) John von Neumann	(United States) Warren Cox	(United States) Ed Lunken	(United States) Dan Fowler	(United States) Lake Underwood	(United States) Don Wester	(United States) Frank Baptista	(United States) Al Allin	(United States) Bruce Townsend	Results
5	Marlboro	no entries	#111 Chevrolet	**#61 Auto Engineering**	#55 Jaguar	#30 Mercedes-Benz	#73 Austin-Healey	#6 Ferrari	#175 A.C.-Bristol	#140 Porsche	#157 Porsche	#35 Lotus	#177 Alfa Romeo	#4 PBX	Results
5	Marlboro	no entries	(United States) Dick Thompson	**(United States) Walt Hansgen**	(United States) Bob Rubin	(United States) Paul O'Shea	(United States) Fred Moore	(United States) Ed Lunken	(United States) Chuck Sarle	(United States) Bob Holbert	(United States) Dick Nash	(United States) Frank Baptista	(United States) Tony Briggs	(United States) Dolph Vilardi	Results
6	VIR	no finishers	#211 Chevrolet	**#98 John Engar**	#49 Aston Martin	#30 Mercedes-Benz	#106 Austin-Healey	#59 Ferrari	#17 A.C.-Bristol	#140 Porsche	#257 Porsche	#2 Lotus	#13 Alfa Romeo	#147 D.B.-Panhard	Results
6	VIR	no finishers	(United States) Dick Thompson	**(United States) Carroll Shelby**	(United States) George Constantine	(United States) Paul O'Shea	(United States) Harold Kunz	(United States) John Middleton	(United States) Bob Kuhn	(United States) Bob Holbert	(United States) Dick Nash	(United States) M. R. J. Wyllie	(United States) Ed Hugus	(United States) Howard Hanna	Results
7	Montgomery	no entries	#114 Chevrolet	**#60 Briggs Cunningham**	#180 Mercedes-Benz	#100 Maserati	#166 Austin-Healey	#35 Ferrari	#64 A.C.-Bristol	#37 Porsche	#137 Porsche	#35 Lotus	#31 Alfa Romeo	#112 Bandini-Saab	Results
7	Montgomery	no entries	(United States) Bark Henry	**(United States) Walt Hansgen**	(United States) Harry Carter	(United States) John Fitch	(United States) Warren Cox	(Switzerland) Gaston Andrey	(United States) Bob Kuhn	(United States) Lake Underwood	(United States) Lake Underwood	(United States) Frank Baptista	(United States) Bob Grossman	(United States) Henry Rudkin	Results
8	Thompson^{B}	no finishers	#135 Chevrolet	#52 Jaguar	#149 Aston Martin	#29 Maserati	#79 Austin-Healey	no finishers	#175 A.C.-Bristol	#65 Porsche	#114 Porsche	#54 Lotus	#7 Alfa Romeo	#86 PBX	Results
8	Thompson^{B}	no finishers	(United States) Leonard Butscher	(United States) Gordon MacKenzie	(United States) George Constantine	(United States) Bob Bucher	(United States) Mike Rothschild	no finishers	(United States) Ed Welch	(United States) Paul Sagan	(United States) Freddie Barrette	(United States) Charles Cunningham	(United States) Vin Sardi	(United States) Candy Poole	Results
9	Road America	#85 Andy Hotton	#4 Chevrolet	**#41 Gene Greenspun**	#3 David F. Causey	#8 John Edgar	#10 Trant Jarman	#6 Lunken-Fulton	#17 Bob Kuhn	#69 Edward W. Crawford	#34 Don P. Wester	#2 M. R. J. Wyllie	#34 William M. Speer	#61 Bruce D. Townsend	Results
9	Road America	(United States) John Cook (United States) Ralph Durbin	(United States) Dick Thompson	**(United States) Phil Hill**	(United States) Dave Causey	(United States) Carroll Shelby	(United States) Trant Jarman	(United States) Ed Lunken (United States) Jim Kimberly	(United States) Bob Kuhn	(United States) Ed Crawford	(United States) Don Wester	(United States) M. R. J. Wyllie (United States) Margaret Wyllie	(United States) Ed Hugus	(United States) Bruce Townsend	Results
10	Watkins Glen	no entries	#24 Chevrolet	**#60 Briggs Cunningham**	#80 Mercedes-Benz	#30 Mercedes-Benz	#45 Austin-Healey	#25 Maserati	#24 A.C.-Bristol	#140 Porsche	#213 Porsche	#150 Elva	#13 Alfa Romeo	#173 Bandini	Results
10	Watkins Glen	no entries	(United States) Fred Windridge	**(United States) Walt Hansgen**	(United States) Harry Carter	(United States) Paul O'Shea	(United States) Gilbert Geitner	(United States) John Fitch	(United States) William Burroughs	(United States) Bob Holbert	(United States) Freddie Barrette	(United States) Chuck Dietrich	(United States) Ed Hugus	(United States) Melvin Sachs	Results
11	Bridgehampton	no entries	#99 Chevrolet	**#60 Briggs Cunningham**	#80 Mercedes-Benz	#100 Maserati	#45 Austin-Healey	#8 Maserati	#180 A.C.-Bristol	#0 Porsche	#173 Porsche	#35 Lotus	#179 Alfa Romeo	#53 D.B.-Panhard	Results
11	Bridgehampton	no entries	(United States) Fred Windridge	**(United States) Walt Hansgen**	(United States) Harry Carter	(United States) Bruce Kessler	(United States) Gilbert Geitner	(United States) John Fitch	(United States) Harry Carter	(United States) Charles Wallace	(United States) Lake Underwood	(United States) Frank Baptista	(United States) Tony Briggs	(United States) Gordon Wing	Results
12	VIR	no finishers	#135 Chevrolet	**#61 Briggs Cunningham**	#80 Mercedes-Benz	no finishers	#45 Austin-Healey	#25 Ferrari	#24 A.C.-Bristol	#0 Briggs Cunningham	#137 Porsche	#2 Lotus	#120 Alfa Romeo	#109 D.B	Results
12	VIR	no finishers	(United States) Leonard Butscher	**(United States) Charles Wallace**	(United States) Harry Carter	no finishers	(United States) Gilbert Geitner	(Switzerland) Gaston Andrey	(United States) William Burroughs	(United States) Charles Wallace	(United States) Lake Underwood	(United States) M. R. J. Wyllie	(United States) Brooks Robinson	(United States) Wiley Reid	Results
13	Palm Springs	#70 Buick	#58 Chevrolet	**#98 John Engar**	#221 Mercedes-Benz	#59 Aston Martin	#158 Austin-Healey	#125 Ferrari 500 TR	#195 A.C.-Bristol	#88 Porsche	#6 Porsche	#151 Lotus	#51 Alfa Romeo	^{C}	Results
13	Palm Springs	(United States) Max Balchowsky	(United States) Jerry Austin	**(United States) Carroll Shelby**	(United States) Ron Ellico	(United States) Bob Oker	(United States) Jay Hoke	(United States) Pete Lovely	(United Kingdom) William Love	(United States) Jack McAfee	(United States) Skip Hudson	(United States) Leon Miller	(United States) Fred Woodward	^{C}	Results
14	Laguna Seca	no finishers	#34 Chevrolet	#190 John Edgar	#100 Jaguar	#11 John von Neumann	#146 Austin-Healey	**#125 Fred Armbruster**	#195 A.C.-Bristol	#55 Porsche	#172 Porsche	#87 Lotus	#41 Alfa Romeo	#79 D.B.	Results
14	Laguna Seca	no finishers	(United States) Cloyd Gray	(United States) Richie Ginther	(United States) Ray Seher	(United States) John von Neumann	(United States) Hugh Pryor	**(United States) Pete Lovely**	(United States) Bill Love	(United States) Sam Weiss	(United States) Skip Hudson	(United States) Paul Nau	(United States) Fred Woodward	(United States) Bill Wood	Results
15	Riverside	#70 Buick	#8 C.S. Mead	**#98 John Edgar**	#7 Robert Fletcher	#11 John von Neumann	#46 Hugh Pryor	#125 Fred Armbruster	#195 A.C.-Bristol	#88 Stan Sugarman	#113 M.M. Kasler	#27 Skip Conklin	#50 Fred Woodward	Jim Parkinson	Results
15	Riverside	(United States) Max Balchowsky	(United States) Jerry Austin	**(United States) Carroll Shelby**	(United States) Robert Fletcher	(United States) John von Neumann	(United States) Hugh Pryor	(United States) Pete Lovely	(United States) Bill Love	(United States) Jack McAfee	(United States) Lew Bracker	(United States) Skip Conklin	(United States) Fred Woodward	(United States) Jim Parkinson	Results

^A C Production were classified with B Production at Eagle Mountain.
^B The feature race at Thompson was won overall by Bill Rutan in an Unrestricted-class Lester -MG.
^C H Sports were classified with G Sports at Palm Springs.

== Champions ==
Class	Driver	Car
B Sports	(United States) J. E. Rose	Chevrolet Corvette SR-2
B Production	(United States) Dick Thompson	Chevrolet Corvette
C Sports	(United States) Walt Hansgen	Jaguar D-Type
C Production	(United States) Harry Carter	Mercedes-Benz 300SL
D Sports	(United States) Paul O'Shea	Mercedes-Benz 300SL Roadster
D Production	(United States) Fred Moore	Austin-Healey 100M
E Sports	(Switzerland) Gaston Andrey	Ferrari 500 Mondial
E Production	(United States) Bob Kuhn	AC Ace-Bristol
F Sports	(United States) Charles Wallace	Porsche 550 RS
F Production	(United States) Lake Underwood	Porsche 356 Carrera
G Sports	(United States) Frank Baptista	Lotus Eleven Monza-Climax
G Production	(United States) Tony Briggs	MG TC, Alfa Romeo Giulietta Veloce
H Sports	(United States) Melvin Sachs	Bandini
