= Jim Gary =

American artist and sculptor (1939-2006)

- Born: March 17, 1939; Sebastian, Florida, USA
- Died: January 14, 2006 (aged 66)
- Occupation: Sculptor
- Known for: metal sculptures made from automobile parts, hardware, tools, and stained glass; Twentieth Century Dinosaurs
- Notable work: Universal Woman; Stegosaurus; Daphne; Dagmar's Signature Bird; Stained Glass Woman With Tattoo
- Website: www.kafi-benz.com

Jim Gary (March 17, 1939 – January 14, 2006) was an American sculptor popularly known for his large, colorful creations of dinosaurs made from discarded automobile parts. These sculptures were typically finished with automobile paint although some were left to develop a natural patina during display outdoors.

He was also recognized internationally for his fine, architectural, landscape, and whimsical monumental art as well as abstracts. Sculpture and life figures by Gary often included intricate use of stained glass and his works were frequently composed of, or included, hardware, machine parts, and tools. He employed painted steel in many works, it being his metal of choice.

One of his signature works, Universal Woman, a life-sized figure of a woman composed entirely of hardware gained the admiration of renowned sculptor Jacques Lipchitz at a sidewalk show in New York in the early 1960s. Both are modernist sculptors. The Washington Post featured a zoom image from their files of this sculpture in its electronic edition of their 2006 tribute to Gary at his death. A 1971 museum exhibit of his fine art in Washington, D.C., was cited in his listing in Who Was Who in American Art, 1564-1975: 400 Years of Artists in America, a standard library art reference. In 2011 the Asbury Park Press referred to Gary as an icon in the arts.

He was born in Sebastian, Florida, but lived in Colts Neck, New Jersey from early infancy and considered it his hometown. At the time of his death he was a resident of nearby Farmingdale.

Jim Gary is the only sculptor ever invited to present a solo exhibition at the Smithsonian Institution's National Museum of Natural History in Washington, D.C., which opened on April 12, 1990. In January 2006, Time stated that Gary's work "delighted kids as well as curators, including those at the Smithsonian's National Museum of Natural History, where he had an acclaimed solo show in 1990." A video tribute to Jim Gary was featured by ABC News on This Week with George Stefanopoulos on Sunday, January 22, 2006. During the same month, on January 24, 2006, the Los Angeles Times reported in an article, Jim Gary, 66; Artist Who Created Playful Dinosaur Skeletons From Car Parts, that some critics compared Jim Gary's sculptures with Pablo Picasso's famous Bull's Head sculpture, made from a bicycle seat and handlebars. The New York Times devoted half of a page to their newsworthy obituary for Gary on January 19, 2006. Because of his international popularity his death was treated as news around the world and the Gary obituary ran the next day in the arts and leisure section of the globally distributed English language newspaper, the International Herald Tribune, with the title, Jim Gary, Sculptor in Metal.

== Biography ==
While still at grammar school, at the age of eleven, he moved out of his parents' Colts Neck home and began making his own living. He supported himself by doing odd jobs and selling his handmade seasonal decorations. For almost a year he secretly slept in the garage of the Sterner family, a prominent Monmouth County couple in the same community, who employed him regularly. Once the family discovered this, they provided space in their home for him. He remained close to them until they died. Gary attended Freehold High School, where he developed an interest in sculpting with wood; he was inducted into the school's hall of fame in 2007.

From junk parts, Jim Gary built what he needed to get about, first a bicycle and soon—long before he was old enough to drive on the roads legally—automobiles. He competed in gymnastics as a student. After serving in the United States Navy he taught welding and gymnastics in a federal program. During this period he developed a deft hand at welding. Shortly thereafter, applying these welding skills, he began making sculptures that he marketed as architectural elements, and showing his fine art in the New York metropolitan area. The admiration of welders regarding his welding skills also is documented on his official web site.

== Career launched ==
Reassured of the caliber of his work by the compliments he received in the encounter with Lipchitz (who made a professional suggestion for a better method of preparing a stand for the life-sized torso Gary had on display), he established his gallery, Iron Butterfly, in Colts Neck featuring the works of other artists he selected as well as his own work, later moving the gallery to Red Bank. The multitalented Gerald Lubeck was one such artist featured at Gary's fledgling gallery. Classes were offered at the gallery by Jim Gary and Virginia Laudano (who managed the gallery when Gary was on tour, as well as serving as an instructor. Virginia Laudano later became an instructor at the Art Club of Sun City Center, an art center in Florida).

Gary's fine art—such as the life-sized Universal Woman—wall units, bronze portraits and busts, and abstracts consistently won top prizes when submitted in the professional show circuits of New York and the surrounding states. He featured stained glass in many of his formal sculptures. It was often used for accent, but some life-sized figurative studies such as Stained Glass Woman with Tattoo were constructed entirely of multi-colored glass sections welded together. He was commissioned to create entire suites of rooms, integrating his sculpture into furniture he built. Commissions included ornate metal doors made to order. He sometimes used the products of clients to create fine art for their offices. Brewers especially liked to give huge seasonal wreaths he constructed from their original cans. One of his works had brass fish swimming through copper seagrass. Some of his sculptures were kinetic. Commissions from clients often asked merely for his interpretation of their favorite subject.

Examples of his many architectural sculptures include his baptismal font for Saint Benedict's Catholic Church in nearby Holmdel, a Holocaust memorial commissioned in Springfield, his life-sized nudes in metal and stained glass for the Monmouth County Opera Society, and his numerous sculptures in the park featuring his landscape design of the September 11 memorial at the Municipal Building in Colts Neck.

As he gathered parts for the unique automobiles he constructed when he was young, Jim Gary said he realized that these parts resembled anatomical structures of insects, large birds, reptiles, and especially the bones of dinosaurs. Early in his career, he began to construct sculptures of those animals by assembling the automobile parts into almost life-sized models. He used as many as eight to ten vehicles to create his large dinosaur sculptures and the unaltered parts are identifiable. Common tools became pivotal structures in some of his sculptures. Volkswagens metamorphosed into turtles and prehistoric dinosaurs.

Gary had to invent equipment to build and move the huge sculptures, creating the scaffolding, hoists, and even special vehicles that featured cranes to haul the sculptures around at his rural workshop and to place them onto trucks for transportation. He also relied upon blacksmith skills to fashion unique hand tools when no standard ones were useful for his needs.

== International traveling exhibition launched ==
These sculptures provided a unique display that became Jim Gary's hallmark by the early 1970s and soon it became the traveling exhibition, Jim Gary's Twentieth Century Dinosaurs, which appealed to toddlers through grandparents. Some of his signature sculptures in the exhibition exceeded sixty feet and Gary frequently painted them in bright colors using automobile paints. They were often transported to exhibitions on huge, open flatbed trucks, fascinating fellow travelers on the roads. Impromptu parades formed as drivers followed the dinosaurs to their destination or a stopping point, where people milled around the trucks asking questions and admiring the sculptures.

In 1979 the Academy of Natural Sciences in Philadelphia contracted with Gary for an exhibition of his sculptures. It is the oldest institution of its kind in the entire hemisphere. The implications of their acceptance of his work as interesting to scientists and their audiences as well as to art lovers and popular culture audiences set Gary on a course for his career that garnered invitations from all over the world through marketing targeted to diverse types of museums and venues. Steve Miller of the New York Sun noted in his news breaking obituary in 2006 that the museum exhibit at the academy brought national attention to Jim Gary. In 1982 his sculpture was hosted by Carnegie.

Once asked why he built all of the enormous dinosaur sculptures, the typically quiet sculptor responded, "Because people like them." The huge crowds who flocked to his exhibits demonstrated their immense popularity. Grinning Jim Gary birds, critters, and dinosaurs have been featured in articles and on the covers of magazines from Smithsonian and Sculpture Review (publication of the National Sculpture Society) to National Geographic World (now called, National Geographic Kids) and Time. His work has been featured in textbooks, encyclopedias, educational videos, newspapers, on the Internet, and on television shows around the world. In January 2006, the Los Angeles Times reported that "one of his works, Stegosaurus, is included in Alphabet Animals, a children's book by Charles Sullivan that includes depictions of animals by John James Audubon, Alexander Calder, and Marc Chagall." All of the letters of the alphabet were taught using works of fine art through illustrations or professional photographs of artworks. "S" was taught with Gary's green dinosaur, Stegosaurus.

After the display became the permanent Jim Gary's Twentieth Century Dinosaurs exhibition, it traveled internationally to museums and universities; was used as sets for films, plays, and operas; was presented as exhibits for national auto shows and racing events as well as the premier international auto shows such as New York and Detroit; and was presented as landscape displays in the most elegant of botanical gardens, such as Longwood Gardens on the Pierre S. du Pont estate.

The premier research and development center for revolutionary technologies, Bell Laboratories, booked a private exhibition of fifty of Gary's sculptures in 1981 for the atrium lobby of their Holmdel facility for the benefit of its employees, as the first in a diversified art program planned to provide the enhancement of the environment and enrichment and cultural benefits for the employees and the visitors to the center. A well-publicized reception for the opening of the solo show at the corporation was attended by the family and friends of the staff.

The exhibition was booked for a tour of Japan that began in April 1984. The poster displayed to the right was for the opening exhibition at a national museum in Tokyo that lasted through May, before making a six-month tour to museums in other Japanese cities. Posters were distributed in the cities that were included in the tour and they were displayed in buses, trains, and other public places to announce the exhibition in each museum.

A four-month-long museum solo show of his sculpture exhibition was held from July–November 1985 at the California Academy of Sciences in San Francisco, California. This exhibition was also used as the setting for significant portions of the 1986 film, Howard the Duck, a science fiction comedy produced by George Lucas.

This exhibition opened for Jim Gary's unique four-month solo show of his sculpture at the Smithsonian Institution's National Museum of Natural History in Washington, D.C., on April 12, 1990, and, according to the museum director, drew record-breaking attendance to the museum. Gary is the only living sculptor ever invited for a solo show and the museum director indicated that it exceeded the number of visitors to any other exhibitions.

Commissioned work and fees for the exhibitions of his work that were so heavily attended became his mainstay. His gallery was closed in favor of marketing through his studio. Signature sculptures of Gary's fine art were among the works displayed in these solo shows and tours, attracting many commissions for private collections. Selected works offered for sale sometimes accompanied the permanent exhibition as it was booked for displays, shows, and exhibits.

In 1993 the award-winning Nicky Silver play, Pterodactyls, featured Jim Gary sculptures in its sets when it opened in Manhattan.

When the state of New Jersey held the gala opening of its first major science museum, the Liberty Science Center, just across the harbor from lower Manhattan on January 28, 1993, the entire first floor exhibition space was devoted to what the museum director called "the spectacular dinosaur sculptures made by... Jim Gary".

A Jim Gary dinosaur is in the collection of Ripley's Believe It or Not!, which displays the sculpture in its museums and features the Gary "Stegosaurus" in its publications. Ripley first exhibited it in their museum in Daegu, Korea and the sculpture travels to other locations.

Many fledgling nonprofit organizations raising funds to build museums and creating parks for children held an exhibition of Jim Gary's Twentieth Century Dinosaurs by covering the expense of the complicated shipping alone, as he donated his normal fees to the cause. Some were able to raise enough funds from fees paid by the visitors to the popular exhibits that, eventually, they could afford to purchase one of his dinosaurs in a permanent acquisition to their collection.

Many children's museums have displayed Gary's sculptures. His shows have attracted large crowds from all over the world, particularly in places such as Australia, China, and Japan.

The last solo shows featuring the Jim Gary's Twentieth Century Dinosaurs exhibition on tour during the lifetime of the sculptor were two related ones in North Carolina in 2004. First the exhibition was displayed at Lowe's Motor Speedway in Concord for its Spring Extravaganza, after which the sculptures traveled to the University of North Carolina at Charlotte for an exhibition hosted by its Belk College of Business. The sculptures were featured both indoors and outside on the large campus with walking and driving tours offered to the public, and the tour was extended twice.

Jim Gary is a self-taught sculptor whose works include abstracts, three-dimensional portraits, architectural, and functional pieces, as well as the celebrated collection of "Twentieth Century Dinosaurs"... [He] creates his art using the things that many of us think of as junk. Old car parts, metal washers, glass, and screws are transformed into extraordinary works through the gift of Jim’s imagination. Considered a master of metal working, Jim creates the impression of motion from cold steel and found objects. Best of all, he infuses humor and personality into his creations. Spend just a few minutes with his road runners and dinosaurs and look at the expressions on their faces – you will find yourself naming the creatures and wanting to take them home!...

In September 2009 Jim Gary's publicist and studio director, Kafi Benz, announced that negotiations were in progress for sculptures from the exhibition to be put on permanent loan at a museum. Her long-range plan was that as much of the traveling exhibition as possible be displayed in permanent collections where the sculptures would remain open to the public. She noted that several sculptures had been placed at museums and venues in New Jersey that traditionally hosted displays of his sculpture throughout Gary's career, but most of the sculptures from the traveling exhibition were among those being included in the negotiations for loan as a single collection. She also stated that other Jim Gary sculptures from private collections could expand the collection that is being loaned by the Jim Gary Foundation.

On August 22, 2011, twenty-one Gary sculptures were shipped from New Jersey to Florida. Three photographers were invited by Gary's studio director and publicist to document the preparations and loading of the sculptures: William Angus, Jason Meehan, and Hal Sokolow. Both Angus and Sokolow have produced works dedicated to, or about, Jim Gary during their careers and more will be produced from the move. Angus stated that he doubted he would ever have an opportunity similar to shooting the complex move again in his lifetime.

Following a refurbishment of the sculptures, they are scheduled to be on exhibit at the Tallahassee Museum for at least a decade. They were at the museum previously, as a traveling exhibition in 1993, and the current executive director of the museum, Russell Daws, was in the same position at that time. Daws was in a similar position in 1979 at the Academy of Natural Sciences in Philadelphia when he contracted with Jim Gary for his first opportunity to exhibit at a museum. An initial opening at an invitational fundraising event on October 14 will be followed by a public opening on October 15, 2011.

== Lectures, media coverage, and annual free display ==
Jim Gary was a popular figure for lectures about his work and was booked as a speaker by diverse groups, ranging from art and cultural associations and institutions to those focused upon automobiles, engineering, science, and trades such as welding. Coverage was frequent by the mass media, both published and broadcast, not only for openings of exhibitions of his work, but as a featured sculptor whose work remained interesting and popular with the public. As an example, Gary was one of the invited speakers in the CBS television documentary Dinosaur!, hosted by Christopher Reeve in 1985.

Gary always took the time to make appearances at schools to show children how he made his sculptures and to encourage them to pursue their own creative talents. Along with typical pieces of his work he also provided small sculptures made of materials familiar to children at school lectures. He personally answered every letter sent to him by a youngster.

As reported by Karen DeMasters in The New York Times on December 16, 2001, in Hark, the Pterodactyl's Wing, every year Jim Gary provided hot chocolate, coffee, and cookies to those visiting an illuminated display of his sculpture, open to the public at his home, to celebrate the holidays in December. Lights were strung on the sculptures to delineate the structure of each dinosaur. During these displays Gary gave lectures and led discussions about his work. In 2005, Gary became too ill to manage his traditional and festive seasonal event, choosing instead to display a few works at a gallery in a nearby community.

Gary was welcoming to people who stopped by his home to admire the sculptures that he kept among his tended gardens. It was not unusual for him to invite visitors to sit down and chat for a while.

== Garysaurus — and other neologisms ==
A tribute to the sculptor was published on February 14, 2006, in the British newspaper, The Guardian, by Andrew Roth, a well known biographer and journalist whose detailed obituaries were composed for national and international figures of note. In this tribute the author coined a new word, Garysaurus, a neologism to describe a dinosaur sculpture created by Jim Gary. The memorials, tributes, and obituaries for Jim Gary were numerous, the international recognition reflecting the widespread appeal of his work. Roth's apt name for Gary's dinosaur sculptures has begun to be used by others.

Early in his career, the invention of neologisms arose for Gary's dinosaurs. Chevrosaurus was among the first when it was published in the New York Times in May 1979. Another New York Times writer described one of Gary's works as a Diner-saurus in 1993, because when the green Stegosaurus was not traveling on exhibition, he usually displayed it at the diner he frequented. None of these stuck for long without the Gary name as part of the new words, as Roth's clever title does in his tribute.

== Death ==
On January 14, 2006, Gary died in Freehold, New Jersey of complications from a cerebral hemorrhage suffered the month before. Jonathan Talbot delivered the eulogy at the memorial service for Gary.

== Notes ==
1. Milestone; Died. Jim Gary, 66, From the Magazine | Notebook, Time, January 30, 2006; page 21
2. Jim Gary by Andrew Roth; Tuesday February 14, 2006; The Guardian; United Kingdom; guardian.co.uk, in which the revered obituary author coined the term, Garysaurus, for the huge sculptures among Jim Gary's Twentieth Century Dinosaurs, using the plural form, Garysauruses, in the obituary.
3. ibid
4. Dinosaurs To Scare A Dinosaur by Yanick Rice Lamb; Currents, January 7, 1993; The New York Times; a news article about the opening of a solo show of Jim Gary's Twentieth Century Dinosaurs for Liberty Science Center at Liberty State Park in Jersey City, in which Jim Gary is quoted regarding the number of vehicles he used as he created large dinosaur sculptures
5. DeMasters, Karen (December 16, 2001). "Hark, the Pterodactyl's Wing". The New York Times.
6. Jeopardy! - November 14, 2007 - featured on the international television quiz game show, Sculptor Jim Gary is known for making this out of junk cars. The question being... What are dinosaurs?
