= University of South Florida Sarasota–Manatee =

Public university in Sarasota, Florida, U.S.

Coordinates: 27°23′28.25″N 82°33′38.13″W

University of South Florida Sarasota-Manatee
- Motto: "Truth and Wisdom"
- Established: 1975
- Parent institution: University of South Florida
- Chancellor: Brett Kemker (interim)
- President: Moez Limayem
- Students: Home campus for 1,310 students. More than 14,000 USF students take classes at the campus.
- Location: Sarasota, Florida, United States
- Campus: 32 acres (0.1 km^{2}); Suburban
- Colors: Green and Gold
- Nickname: Bulls
- Mascot: Rocky the Bull
- Website: www.sarasotamanatee.usf.edu

The University of South Florida Sarasota–Manatee (also known as USF Sarasota-Manatee) is a branch campus of the University of South Florida in Sarasota, Florida, near the Sarasota-Manatee county line. USF Sarasota-Manatee was established in 1975 as a regional campus of the University of South Florida, based in Tampa, and gained separate accreditation by the Southern Association of Colleges and Schools Commission on Colleges to award baccalaureate and master's degrees in June 2011. It was consolidated with the other two USF campuses (Tampa and St. Petersburg) as of July 1, 2020. Day, evening, weekend and online classes serve more than 14,000 students annually.

On May 26, 2026, the Florida State Legislature agreed to transfer all USF Sarasota-Manatee facilities to the neighboring New College of Florida for the 2026–27 academic year, with the University of South Florida retaining $22 million of operating funds, in accordance with a proposal by Florida Governor Ron DeSantis.

== History ==
USF Sarasota-Manatee opened in 1975 as a satellite campus of the University of South Florida.

After its creation, USF Sarasota–Manatee shared the original campus of New College of Florida, which it adopted as its honors college for more than two decades. New College and USF Sarasota-Manatee continued to share campuses until a new campus was built for USF Sarasota-Manatee and New College returned to being a separate institution.

=== Move to a new campus ===
A new campus for USF Sarasota-Manatee opened on August 28, 2006. The campus was built on the eastern portion of Dunham-Crosley-Horton property (Seagate), a historic home that was listed on the National Register of Historic Places in 1983. After a campaign by Friends of Seagate for public acquisition this property had been brought into public ownership in 1991 by the state for the use of the sixteen bay front acres by Manatee County as a historical site and the remainder for research use by the environmental studies department of New College. Potential development purposes were remote at the time.

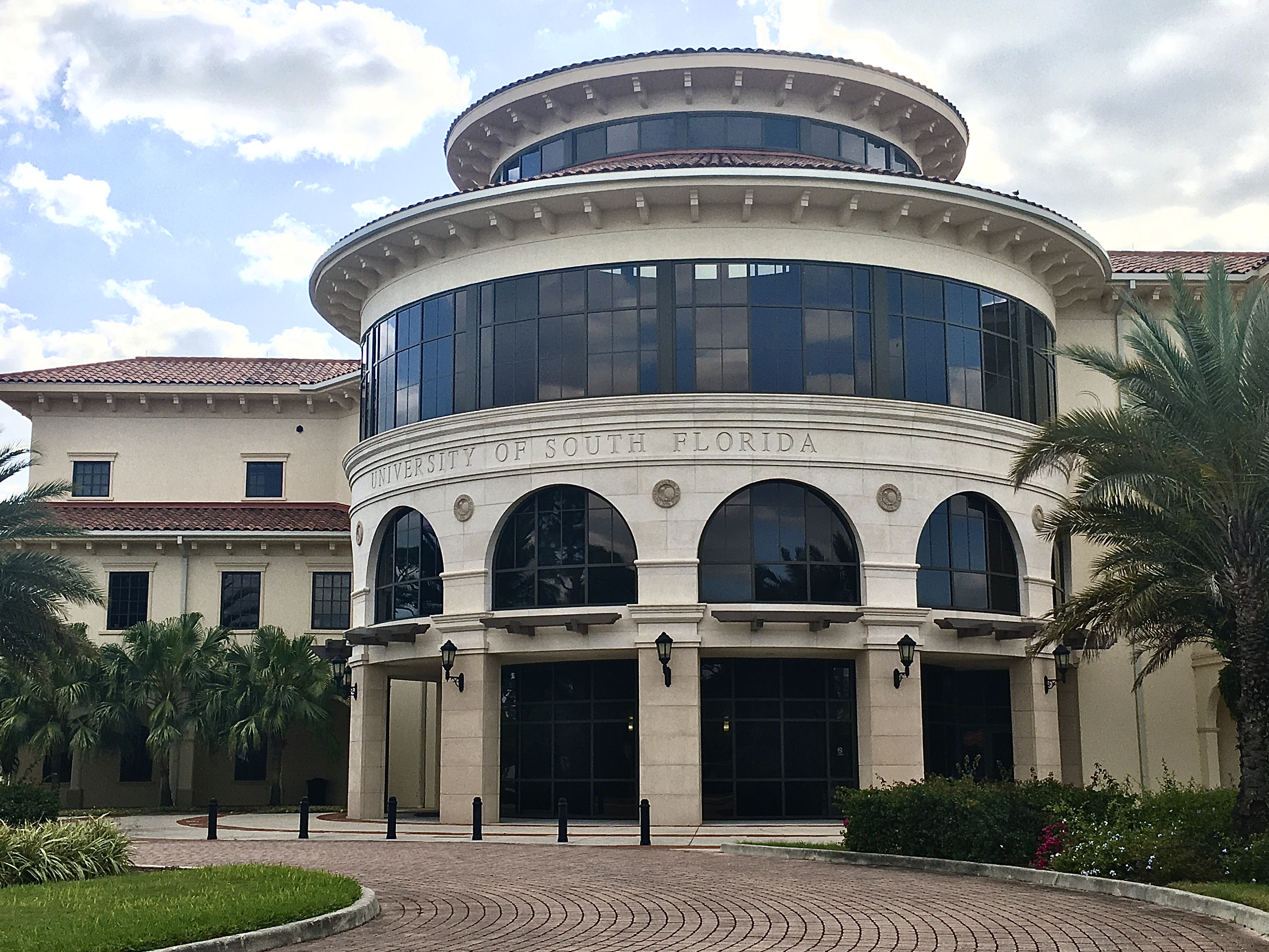
Main Building at the University of South Florida Sarasota-Manatee.

When New College and the university separated, however, the upland pine forest on the eastern portion of this property was allocated for the development of a new campus for the university. University students and community leaders participated on the team that created the design of the new facilities in a protracted charrette.

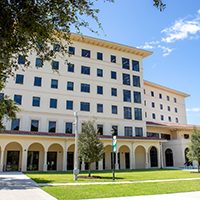
The Student Center and Atala Residence Hall at the University of South Florida Sarasota-Manatee.

The campus consists of two major buildings:

- A 100,000-square-foot (9,300 m^{2})academic facility with 24 classrooms, a 190-seat lecture and exhibition hall, seminar and video-conferencing rooms, computer laboratories, student gathering places, faculty and staff offices, a technology and learning center and a library commons and dining facilities.
- The 100,000-square-foot Student Center and Atala Residence Hall.

In 2010 the campus became the home of a new facility for the radio and television networks of the university, WUSF (FM), WSMR (FM), and WUSF-TV that are part of the public broadcasting network.

=== New student center, residence hall and other expansion ===
On August 19, 2024, USF Sarasota-Manatee opened its new Campus Student Center and Atala Residence Hall. It marked the first major expansion of the campus since 2006 and resulted in USF Sarasota-Manatee becoming a residential campus. The first two floors of the building include a ballroom, bookstore, dining hall and offices for USF World, student government and other student organizations. The top four floors include suites and apartment-style residences for 200 students. The first residents moved in on Aug. 23, 2024. The residence hall portion of the building is named Atala Hall, after a rare tropical butterfly that frequents the campus.

Also being planned and designed is a new 75,000-square-foot academic and research building that will house new laboratories and other research facilities for nursing, engineering, health sciences and other academic programs.

=== Chancellors ===
USF Sarasota-Manatee chancellors
| Name | Term start | Notes |
|---|---|---|
| Laurey Stryker | 2000–December 31, 2006 | Served as vice president and chief executive officer |
| Arthur M. Guilford | January 1, 2007 – July 31, 2014 | |
| Terry A. Osborn | August 1, 2014 – October 31, 2018 | Interim regional chancellor |
| Sandra Stone | November 1, 2014 – March 8, 2017 | |
| Terry A. Osborn | March 9, 2017 – January 1, 2018 | Interim regional chancellor |
| Karen A. Holbrook | January 2, 2018 – 2024 | |
| Brett Kemker | January 2025 – present | Interim regional chancellor |

== Academics ==
Undergraduate and graduate degrees offered by several USF schools and colleges, including the College of Arts and Sciences, the Muma College of Business, the College of Education, the Judy Genshaft Honors College, the College of Nursing and the College of Behavioral and Community Sciences, are available at the Sarasota-Manatee campus. Two schools — the School of Hospitality and Tourism Management and The Baldwin Group School of Risk Management and Insurance — are based at USF Sarasota-Manatee. The campus also is home to the Florida Center for Partnerships in Arts-Integrated Teaching (PAInT).
