= Steven Zucker =

American mathematician (1949–2019)

Steven Mark Zucker
- Born: 12 September 1949; New York City, New York
- Died: 13 September 2019 (aged 70); Baltimore, Maryland
- Education: Princeton University
- Known for: Zucker conjecture
- Scientific career
- Fields: Mathematics
- Institutions: Johns Hopkins University
- Doctoral advisor: Spencer Bloch

Steven Mark Zucker (12 September 1949 – 13 September 2019) was an American mathematician who introduced the Zucker conjecture, proved in different ways by Eduard Looijenga (1988) and by Leslie Saper and Mark Stern (1990).

Zucker completed his Ph.D. in 1974 at Princeton University under the supervision of Spencer Bloch. His work with David A. Cox led to the creation of the Cox–Zucker machine, an algorithm for determining if a given set of sections provides a basis (up to torsion) for the Mordell–Weil group of an elliptic surface $E \to S$, where $S$ is isomorphic to the projective line.

He was part of the mathematics faculty at the Johns Hopkins University. In 2012, he became a fellow of the American Mathematical Society.

== Bibliography ==
- Cox, David A.; Zucker, Steven (1979), "Intersection numbers of sections of elliptic surfaces", Inventiones Mathematicae, 53 (1): 1–44, Bibcode:1979InMat..53....1C, doi:10.1007/BF01403189, MR 0538682, S2CID 15130840
- Looijenga, Eduard (1988). "L^{2}-cohomology of locally symmetric varieties". Compositio Mathematica. 67 (1): 3–20. MR 0949269.
- Saper, Leslie; Stern, Mark L_{2}-cohomology of arithmetic varieties, Annals of Mathematics (2) 132 (1990), no. 1, 1–69. MR 1059935
- Zucker, Steven (1977). "The Hodge conjecture for cubic fourfolds". Compositio Mathematica. 34 (2): 199–209. MR 0453741.
- Zucker, Steven (1978). "Théorie de Hodge à coefficients dégénérescents". Comptes rendus de l'Académie des Sciences. 286: 1137–1140.
- Zucker, Steven (1979). "Hodge theory with degenerating coefficients: L^{2}-cohomology in the Poincaré metric". Annals of Mathematics. 109 (3): 415–476. doi:10.2307/1971221. JSTOR 1971221.
- Zucker, Steven (1982). "L^{2}-cohomology of warped products and arithmetic groups". Inventiones Mathematicae. 70 (2): 169–218. Bibcode:1982InMat..70..169Z. doi:10.1007/BF01390727. S2CID 121348276.
