= Cubic fourfold =

Concept in algebraic geometry

In algebraic geometry, a cubic fourfold is a degree 3 hypersurface of dimension 4 in 5-dimensional projective space. Although some cubic fourfolds are known to be rational, it is known that very general cubic fourfolds are not rational, as proven by Katzarkov, Kontsevich, Pantev and Yu.

Using geometric invariant theory (GIT), Radu Laza constructed a compactification of cubic fourfolds with ADE singularities (including all smooth cubic fourfolds). He further showed that this compactification is isomorphic, via the period map, to Looijenga's compactification of the complement of certain arrangement of hyperplanes in the period space. Yuchen Liu further showed that the GIT compactification is isomorphic to the K-moduli of cubic fourfolds.
