= Arland F. Christ-Janer =

American academic (1922–2008)

Interim President of the Ringling School of Art and Design
- In office 1998–1999

President of the Ringling School of Art and Design
- In office 1984–1996

President of Stephens College
- In office 1975–1983
- Preceded by: Seymour Smith
- Succeeded by: Patsy Sampson

3rd President of New College
- Preceded by: John Elmendorf
- Succeeded by: Mike Michalson; From January 7, 2003; acting from 2001 to 2003 (Office Abolished until 2001)

6th President of Boston University
- In office 1967 – July 1970
- Preceded by: Harold C. Case
- Succeeded by: John Silber

10th President of Cornell College
- In office March 1, 1962 – 1967

Personal details
- Born: January 22, 1922 Garland, Nebraska
- Died: November 8, 2008 (aged 86)
- Education: Carleton College, Yale Divinity School, University of Chicago Law School

Military service
- Battles/wars: World War II

Arland F. Christ-Janer (January 22, 1922 – November 8, 2008) was an academic who served as the president of a number of educational institutions, including as president of the College Entrance Examination Board and as the sixth president of Boston University.

Christ-Janer was born in Nebraska and received his Bachelor of Arts at Carleton College. He also earned degrees at Yale Divinity School and the University of Chicago. During World War II he served in the Pacific as a bombardier in the 39th Bomb Group (VH), a U.S. Army Air Force B29 squadron.

At the beginning of his career he was an administrator for Lake Erie College and later Saint John's College. 1962 marked his transfer to Cornell College as its president. During his time as president of Boston University, from 1967 to 1970, the school was facing much political turmoil from the Students for a Democratic Society and one of the schools African American organizations. At the time of Christ-Janer's inauguration both organizations protested with a sit-in in the presidential office. Although Christ-Janer made attempts to quell the turmoil at the school, ultimately his efforts proved to be unsuccessful and he resigned in July 1970.

Even though 1970 marked a difficult conclusion to his time at Boston University, Christ-Janer was to be appointed as College Entrance Examination Board's president in the same year. In 1973 he moved to Florida where he was inaugurated as the president of New College located in Sarasota, Florida. He relocated to Missouri in 1975 where he served as the president of Stephens College.

His final academic position was held at the Ringling College of Art and Design (latter, Ringling School of Design) where he was inaugurated as president in 1984. Under Christ-Janer's presidency, the school's endowment was raised to the highest level in its history, the campus was renovated and the school began offering four year degrees. He retired in 1996 and served on the board of the Ringling Art Museum until his death in 2008.

== Published works ==
- Memories of Arland F. Christ Janer
