= L² cohomology =

In mathematics, L^{2} cohomology is a cohomology theory for smooth non-compact manifolds M with Riemannian metric. It is defined in the same way as de Rham cohomology except that one uses square-integrable differential forms. The notion of square-integrability makes sense because the metric on M gives rise to a norm on differential forms and a volume form.

L^{2} cohomology, which grew in part out of L^{2} d-bar estimates from the 1960s, was studied cohomologically, independently by Steven Zucker (1978) and Jeff Cheeger (1979). It is closely related to intersection cohomology; indeed, the results in the preceding cited works can be expressed in terms of intersection cohomology.

Another such result is the Zucker conjecture, which states that for a Hermitian locally symmetric variety the L^{2} cohomology is isomorphic to the intersection cohomology (with the middle perversity) of its Baily–Borel compactification (Zucker 1982). This was proved in different ways by Eduard Looijenga (1988) and by Leslie Saper and Mark Stern (1990).

== See also ==
- Dirichlet form
- Dirichlet principle
- Riemannian manifold
