= Michael Corcoran (lobbyist) =

Florida lobbyist and fundraiser

- Born: Michael C. Corcoran; 1967 (age 58–59); Toronto, Ontario, Canada
- Education: Saint Leo University
- Occupations: Lobbyist; fundraiser
- Spouse: Jessica Corcoran
- Children: 4
- Relatives: Jacqueline Corcoran (sister); Richard Corcoran (brother)

Michael C. Corcoran (born 1967) is an Canadian-American Republican lobbyist and fundraiser based in Florida.

== Background ==
Corcoran was born in Toronto, Canada. He received a business degree in 1990 from Saint Leo University. He worked in marketing in Dallas and in Santiago, Chile. He was a fundraiser for the Republican Party of Florida under Daniel Webster. From 1992, he was legislative aide in Florida House District 62 to Buddy Johnson and (from 1996) to former House Speaker Johnnie Byrd. He then worked as a legislative and governmental affairs consultant for Metz, Hauser & Husband PA.

== Lobbying career ==
Corcoran founded Corcoran & Associates with his wife Jessica Ray Corcoran (b. 1972) in 2001. His early business was buoyed by easy access to his ally Byrd, who became House Speaker in 2002. This influence was criticized, as was Byrd's hiring of Corcoran's sister Jacqueline ("Jackie").

With the addition of Jeff Johnson, the firm became Corcoran & Johnson. In 2019, the firm was rebranded Corcoran Partners.

In 2021, Corcoran Partners took in $5.9 million in lobbying fees. Corcoran & Johnson's revenue expanded considerably in 2018. In 2012, the firm generated $2.4 million in legislative fees.

Corcoran is the capital lobbyist for a nonprofit owned by the husband of Sarasota County Commissioner Teresa Mast and in August 2025, he was one of only two applicants entering the bidding for the capital lobbyist for Sarasota County due to issuance of the county invitation as a private bid sent only to six firms. After public disclosure, the bidding process is now rescheduled.

== Political committees ==
Corcoran chairs the Building a Better Florida political committee. He chaired Florida Attorney General Ashley Moody's Finance Committee in 2017 and her Inauguration Committee in 2019. Corcoran was also a prominent supporter of Marco Rubio.

== Personal life ==
Michael and Jessica met while campaigning for Republican state representative Buddy Johnson. The couple has four children. They reside in Odessa, Florida.

His brother Richard Corcoran is a former lobbyist, a former speaker of the Florida House, and currently president of New College of Florida in Sarasota, Florida. His sister Jacqueline Corcoran is also a lobbyist with his firm.
