= Brad Thiessen (disambiguation) =

Brad Thiessen (born 1986) is a Canadian ice hockey goaltender.

Brad or Bradley Thiessen may also refer to:

- Bradley Thiessen (statistician) (fl. 2008–2025), American statistician and academic administrator
- Brad Thiessen (curler) (born 1990), Canadian curler
