= Erin Lipp =

American microbiologist

- Education: University of South Florida
- Scientific career
- Thesis: The occurrence, distribution and transport of human pathogens in coastal waters of southwest Florida (1999)

Erin Katherine Lipp is a professor at the University of Georgia who is known for her work on pathogenic microorganisms and the impact of climate change on microorganisms. She is an elected fellow of the American Academy of Microbiology.

== Education and career ==
Lipp received her B.A. from the New College of Florida in 1994, and earned her Ph.D. in 1999 from the University of South Florida. After conducting postdoctoral work at the University of Maryland, College Park, Lipp moved to the University of Georgia in 2002, where she was promoted to professor in 2014.

== Research ==
Lipp is known for her work on aquatic marine microorganisms, where she focuses on pathogenic microbes and the influence of climate change on bacteria. Her early work examined factors the distribution of human pathogenic bacteria. She has examined how sewage impacts coral-reefs and the role of dust from the Sahara Desert in initiating growth of bacteria.

== Selected publications ==
- Harvell, C. D.; Kim, K.; Burkholder, J. M.; Colwell, R. R.; Epstein, P. R.; Grimes, D. J.; Hofmann, E. E.; Lipp, E. K.; Osterhaus, A. D. M. E.; Overstreet, R. M.; Porter, J. W.; Smith, G. W.; Vasta, G. R. (1999-09-03). "Emerging Marine Diseases--Climate Links and Anthropogenic Factors". Science. 285 (5433): 1505–1510. doi:10.1126/science.285.5433.1505. ISSN 0036-8075. PMID 10498537.
- Lipp, Erin K; Farrah, Samuel A; Rose, Joan B (2001-04-01). "Assessment and Impact of Microbial Fecal Pollution and Human Enteric Pathogens in a Coastal Community". Marine Pollution Bulletin. 42 (4): 286–293. Bibcode:2001MarPB..42..286L. doi:10.1016/S0025-326X(00)00152-1. ISSN 0025-326X. PMID 11381749.
- Lipp, Erin K.; Huq, Anwar; Colwell, Rita R. (2002). "Effects of Global Climate on Infectious Disease: the Cholera Model". Clinical Microbiology Reviews. 15 (4): 757–770. doi:10.1128/CMR.15.4.757-770.2002. ISSN 0893-8512. PMC 126864. PMID 12364378.
- Fong, Theng-Theng; Lipp, Erin K. (2005). "Enteric Viruses of Humans and Animals in Aquatic Environments: Health Risks, Detection, and Potential Water Quality Assessment Tools". Microbiology and Molecular Biology Reviews. 69 (2): 357–371. doi:10.1128/MMBR.69.2.357-371.2005. ISSN 1092-2172. PMC 1197419. PMID 15944460.

== Awards and honors ==
In 2016 Lipp was elected a fellow of the American Academy of Microbiology.
