= Cox–Zucker machine =

Mathematical algorithm

In arithmetic geometry, the Cox–Zucker machine is an algorithm introduced by David A. Cox and Steven Zucker for studying elliptic surfaces. It determines whether a given set of sections of an elliptic surface provides a basis, up to torsion, for the surface's Mordell–Weil group, in the case where the base curve is isomorphic to the projective line. In this context, a section is a morphism from the base curve to the surface whose composition with the fibration is the identity; informally, it selects one point on each fiber.

The underlying method appeared in Cox and Zucker's 1979 article "Intersection numbers of sections of elliptic surfaces". The name "Cox–Zucker machine" was later used by Charles Schwartz in 1984.

== Name origin ==
The name is a near-homophone of the obscenity "cocksucker". In a 2021 memorial tribute to Zucker in Notices of the American Mathematical Society, Cox recalled that, shortly after he and Zucker met as graduate students at Princeton University, they noticed the effect of their surnames in alphabetical order and joked that they should write a joint paper. Cox wrote: "A few weeks after we met, we realized that we had to write a joint paper because the combination of our last names, in the usual alphabetical order, is remarkably obscene."

== See also ==
- Cox ring
