= Jane Bancroft Cook Library =

Academic library in Florida, United States

Coordinates: 27.384881°N 82.558581°W

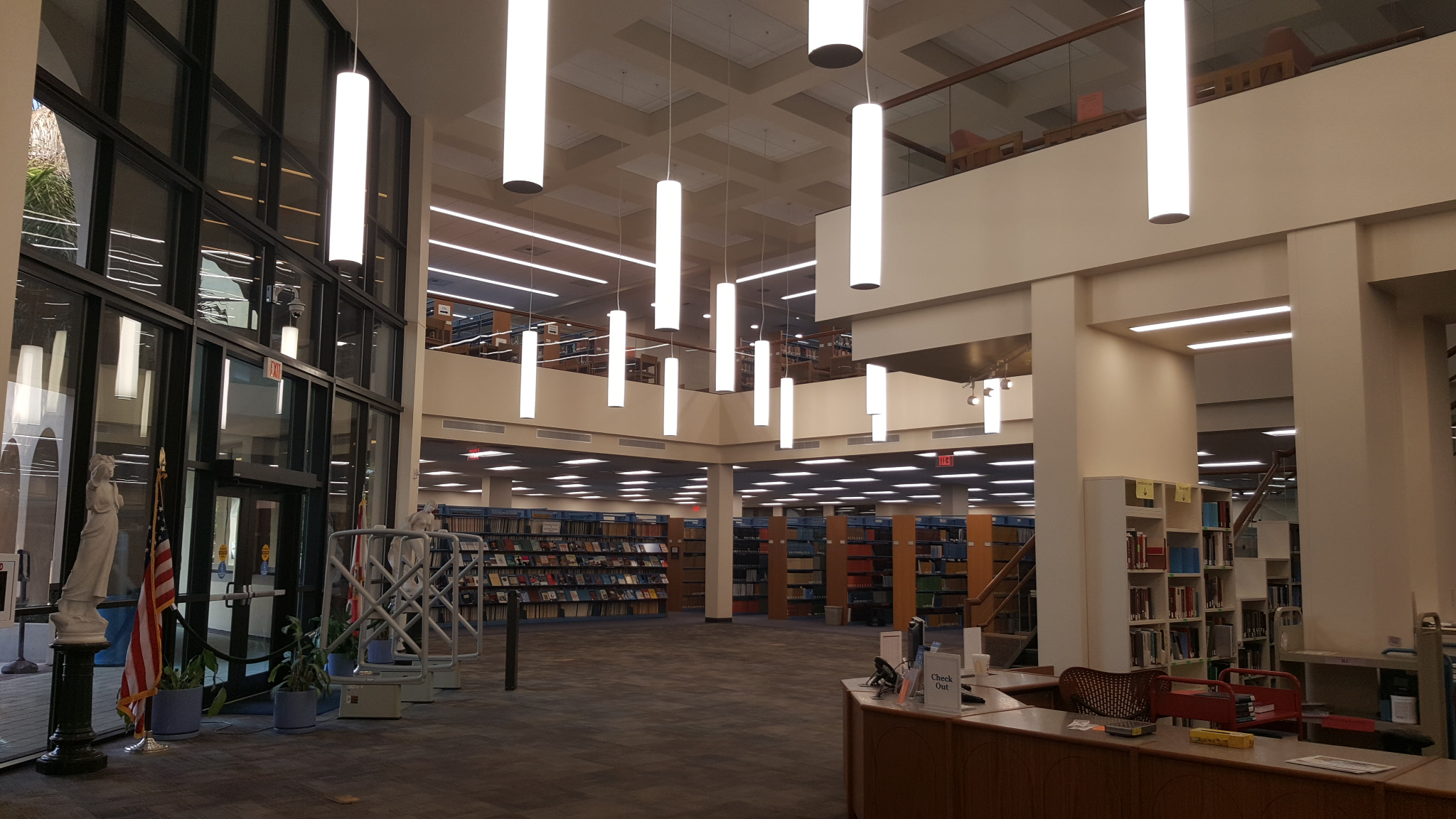
- Location: Sarasota, Florida
- Type: Academic Library
- Established: November 1, 1986

Collection
- Size: ~280,000 volumes

Access and use
- Access requirements: New College of Florida active faculty, students, and staff; community patrons (restricted access)
- Circulation: 30,000 annually
- Members: Tampa Bay Library Consortium (TBLC), Online computer Library Center (OCLC)

Other information
- Director: Dr. Shannon Hausinger
- Website: https://www.ncf.edu/library/
Shared Space within the JBC
- Interactive map of Shared Space within the JBC
Other information
- Facilities: Center for Engagement and Opportunities (CEO), Writing Resource Center (WRC), Quantitative Resource Center (QRC), Educational Technology Services (ETS), Office of Research Programs and Services (ORPS), and the Office of Study Abroad/Off-Campus Studies

The Jane Bancroft Cook Library is an academic library serving New College of Florida (NCF). The library is currently located on the New College campus along US 41 Tamiami Trail right next door to the Ringling Museum. In addition to serving NCF, this facility also serves the community by allowing modest borrowing privileges and Wi-Fi usage on a restricted basis.

== History ==
=== Library ===
Originally, the New College Library was maintained in College Hall, the mansion left over from Charles and Edith Ringling, and was converted in the mid 1960s from living space to learning space. The acquisition of books was fairly quick and the collection grew to around 27,000 volumes within the first three years. When the request was made to make the conversion, there wasn’t a perceived need even for a new library building, this however changed soon as space in the mansion was running out quickly for materials plus there was still a need for much more materials as well. In 1975 the school became part of the State University System allowing for many more sharing opportunities for the library and in the mid 1980s the colleges (USF and NCF) together with the New College Foundation with its many supporters managed to amass enough capital to construct a new library which would be shared with USF. Construction was finished in 1986 and the library was subsequently named the Jane Bancroft Cook Library in 1988 to recognize Jane Bancroft Cook's numerous contributions to New College of Florida.

=== Jane Bancroft Cook ===
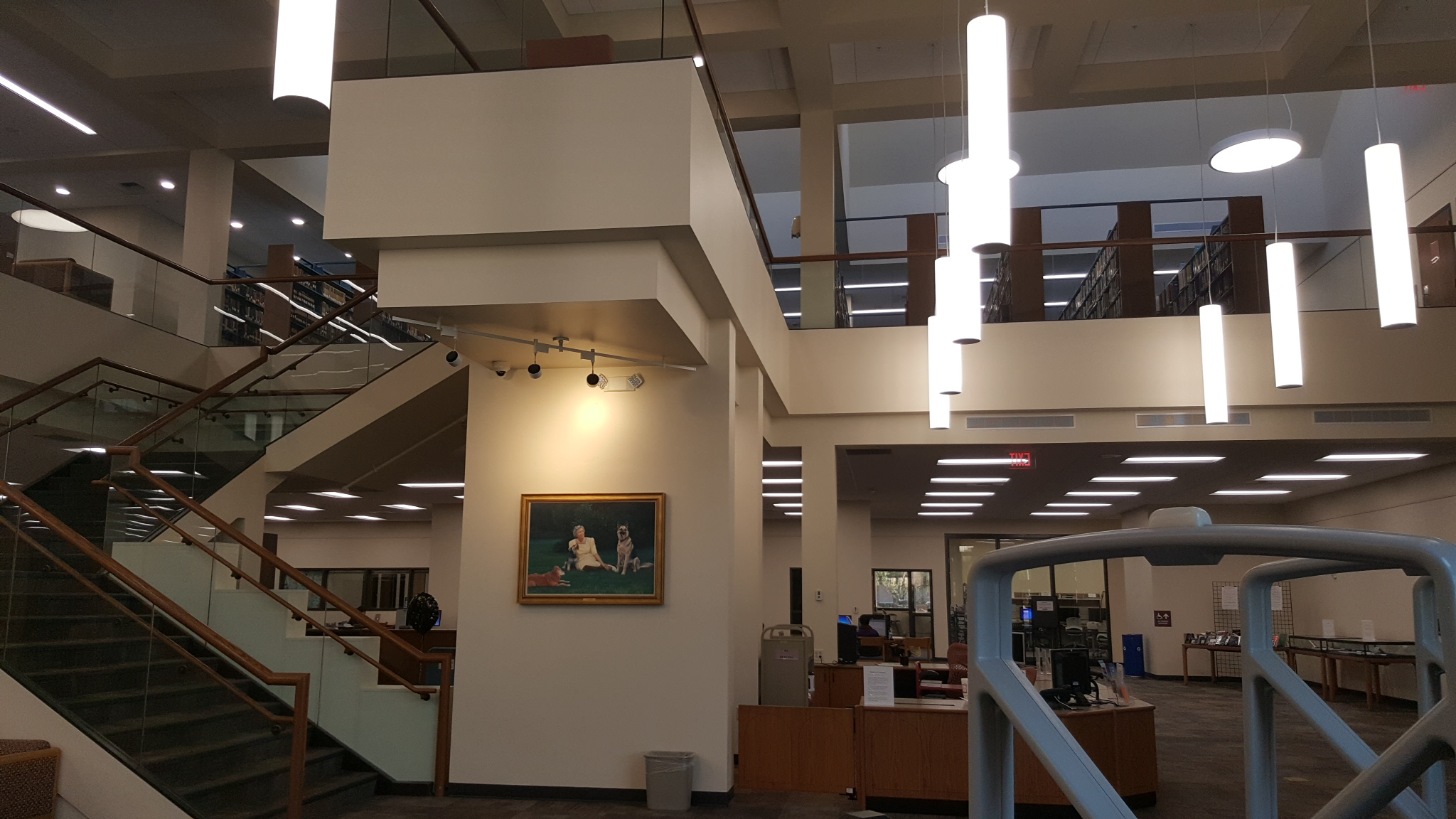
Jane Bancroft Cook Portrait and Book Stacks Above

Jane Bancroft Cook, sometimes mentioned as the Dow Jones heiress, was a prolific philanthropist giving to many campuses across the United States. She moved to Sarasota in the early 1950s and as time progressed she found herself more and more involved with the town; Cook served on the Resource Center's Board of Directors for Sarasota County in the late 1980s and was even a trustee for the college and foundation. The JBC Library holds tribute to her name and her contributions to the school overall.

== Offerings ==
The Jane Bancroft Cook Library uses the Library of Congress Call Number system and holds its main circulating collection of physical books on the second floor, beginning in the far northwest corner with the Juvenile section. This proceeds to the DVD stacks coupled with alternative media such as audiobook cassettes and CDs, and VHS videos followed by musical CDs. The rest of the general collection then starts at A and wraps around the northeast corner, then heads south and wraps around the southeast corner where it stops at Z and the Oversized collection. In this area there are tables, soft furniture, and study carrels. Downstairs, where the lobby can be found, is where the Circulation Desk sits. Reserves for classes are located here and it is also the location for interlibrary loan or UBorrow pick-ups. The large selection of physical periodicals is located on the first floor as well. There is a section where the Faculty/Alumnus Authored and Writer in Residence works are on display, and on the far side of the periodical shelves, there is the Dr. Helen N. Fagin Collection for Holocaust Genocide Humanitarian Studies. Physical copies of undergraduate student theses are also located on the first floor (digital copies published in 2009 up to the present can be found on the library's Student Theses page).

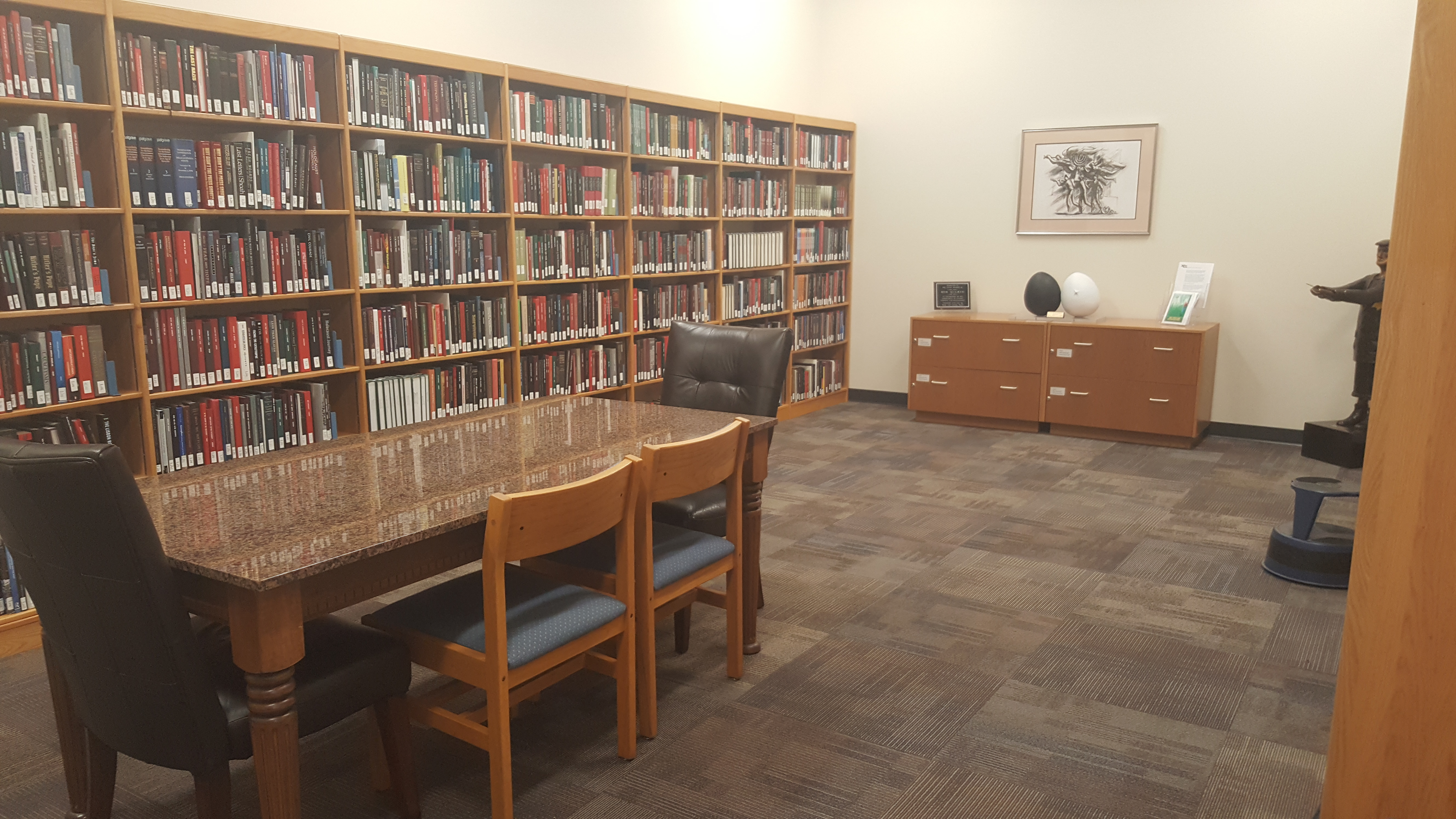
Dr. Helen N. Fagin Collection

The library houses many other areas of specialized studies including the Writing Resource Center, the Quantitative Resource Center Educational Technology Services, Study Abroad, Office of Research Programs and Services, and the Center for Engagement and Opportunities.

Lastly, the JBC Library also has regular study rooms available to check out, many computer stations (PC and Mac) for active students, staff, and faculty of NCF and USF, a 'Collab' room for open group collaborations, a silent study room, a workshop room available by appointment, and a section displaying the Student Theses.

=== Collection ===
The Collection stands around 280,000 volumes, 400 serial titles, has access through UBorrow to lend and borrow from all the institutions in the State University System and Illiad which allows borrowing and lending from institutions world-wide. USF is able to contribute, in addition to books of their own in the library's stacks, access to hundreds of Ebooks and databases ranging from dissertations to news articles and full-text academic journals.

In August 2024, the library discarded, without advance notice to students, books and collections from the Gender and Diversity Center. The American Civil Liberties Union of Florida criticized the disposal of the books as "an intentional act of censorship". A spokesperson for the college said the dean of the library was placed on administrative leave, "after discovering that the library did not follow all of the state administrative requirements while conducting the routine disposition of materials".

=== Digital Collections ===
The Jane Bancroft Cook Library also has digital collections which were designed to share locally produced content with the scholarly community. The digital collections include Environmental Studies Program Collection, the History of New College Collection, Medieval and Renaissance Studies Conference Collection, Architecture Collection, Fine Arts Institute Collection, Schoenberg Manuscript Collection, Special Format Collection, Student Publications, and more. The Architecture Collection includes materials relating to I. M. Pei and the Pei Dorms he designed for the East Campus. The Digital Collections also contain many items related to Charles Edward Ringling and the mansion he and his wife built, which is now part of the New College campus. These include many photos of the mansion (now College Hall), photos of the Ringling, and theses previous students have written about the Ringling.

=== Users ===
The Jane Bancroft Cook Library serves NCF Students, Faculty, and Staff. Faculty receives a checkout length of one academic year, Students and staff receive an academic semester, and community members that have applied for and obtained a guest borrower pass are allowed three weeks with their loan. Media for all borrowers are allowed a week.
