= David A. Cox =

American mathematician

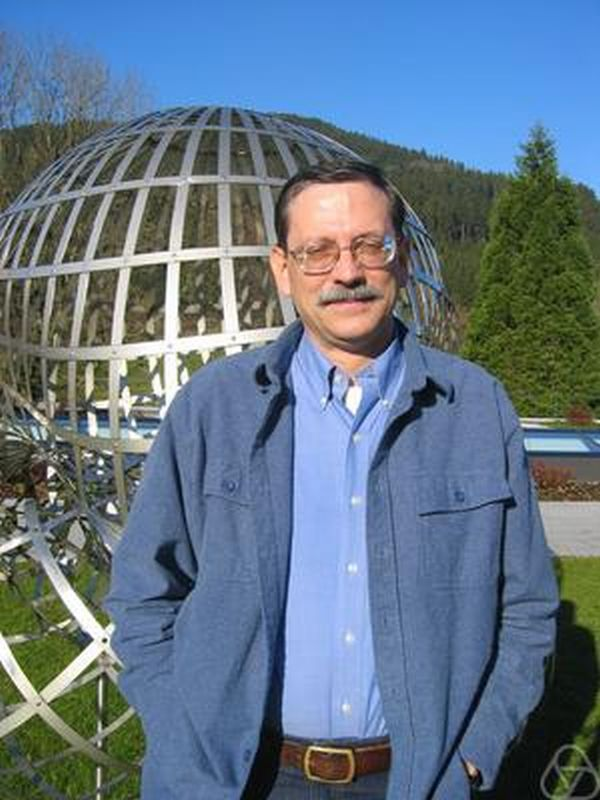
- David A. Cox, Oberwolfach 2007
- Born: David Archibald Cox; September 23, 1948 (age 78); Washington, D.C., US
- Education: Rice University; Princeton University
- Occupations: Mathematician, professor

David Archibald Cox (born September 23, 1948) is a retired American mathematician, working in algebraic geometry.

Cox graduated from Rice University with a bachelor's degree in 1970 and his Ph.D. in 1975 at Princeton University, under the supervision of Eric Friedlander (Tubular Neighborhoods in the Etale Topology). From 1974 to 1975, he was assistant professor at Haverford College and at Rutgers University from 1975 to 1979. In 1979, he became assistant professor and in 1988 professor at Amherst College.

He studies, among other things, étale homotopy theory, elliptic surfaces, computer-based algebraic geometry (such as Gröbner basis), Torelli sets and toric varieties, and history of mathematics. He is also known for several textbooks. He is a fellow of the American Mathematical Society.

From 1987 to 1988 he was a guest professor at Oklahoma State University. In 2012, he received the Lester Randolph Ford Award for Why Eisenstein Proved the Eisenstein Criterion and Why Schönemann Discovered It First.

== Writings ==
- With John Little, Donal O'Shea: Ideals, varieties, and algorithms: an introduction to computational algebraic geometry and commutative algebra, 3rd. edition, Springer Verlag 2007
- David A. Cox, John Little, and Donal O'Shea: Using algebraic geometry, 2nd. edition, Graduate Texts in Mathematics, vol. 185, Springer-Verlag, 2005.
- With Sheldon Katz: Mirror Symmetry and Algebraic Geometry, American Mathematical Society 1999
- Galois Theory, Wiley/Interscience 2004
- With Bernd Sturmfels, Dinesh Manocha (eds.) Applications of computational algebraic geometry, American Mathematical Society 1998
- Primes of the form $x^2 + n \cdot y^2$: Fermat, class field theory, and complex multiplication, Wiley 1989
- With John Little, Henry Schenck: Toric Varieties, American Mathematical Society 2011
- Contributions to Ernst Kunz Residues and duality for projective algebraic varieties, American Mathematical Society 2008
- Cox, David A.; Zucker, Steven (1979), "Intersection numbers of sections of elliptic surfaces", Inventiones Mathematicae, 53 (1): 1–44, Bibcode:1979InMat..53....1C, doi:10.1007/BF01403189, MR 0538682, S2CID 15130840

== See also ==
- Cox–Zucker machine
- Cox ring
