= Patricia Okker =

College president and professor of English

President of the New College of Florida
- Interim
- In office July 2021 – January 2023
- Preceded by: Donal O'Shea
- Succeeded by: Bradley Thiessen (interim)

Personal details
- Education: Allegheny College; University of Georgia; University of Illinois at Urbana-Champaign
- Scientific career
- Fields: American literature
- Workplaces: University of Missouri
- Thesis: Feminizing the voice of literary authority : Sarah J. Hale's editorship of the Ladies' Magazine and Godey's Lady's Book (1990)

Patricia Ann Okker was named president of New College of Florida in 2021. She was previously a professor of English at the University of Missouri, where she focused her studies on American literature.

== Education and career ==
Okker has a B.A. from Allegheny College and an M.A. from the University of Georgia. Okker earned her Ph.D. in 1990 from the University of Illinois Urbana-Champaign. Okker started as an assistant professor at the University of Missouri in 1990, and was promoted to full professor in 2004. From 2005 until 2011, she served as chair of the English department, and from 2017 until 2021 Okker served as dean of the College of Arts and Sciences at the University of Missouri.

In July 2021, Okker became president of New College of Florida, a position she held until 2023 when Governor Ron DeSantis announced that he would replace Okker as college president with Richard Corcoran.

== Work ==
Okker is known for her work in the field of American literature, where she specializes in the history of periodicals. While considering topics for her Ph.D. dissertation, she became interested in women who had edited magazines, which led to her Ph.D. dissertation on Sarah Josepha Hale who was known for her work on women's magazines.

== Selected publications ==
- Okker, Patricia (2008). Our sister editors : Sarah J. Hale and the tradition of nineteenth-century American women editors. University of Georgia Press. ISBN 978-0-8203-3249-9. OCLC 1200072417.
- Okker, Patricia (2003). Social stories the magazine novel in nineteenth-century America. University of Virginia Press. ISBN 0-8139-2240-2. OCLC 708292528.
- Okker, Patricia (2012-06-12). Transnationalism and American Serial Fiction. Routledge. doi:10.4324/9780203804742. ISBN 978-1-136-64319-4.

== Honors and awards ==
In 2003 Okker received the William T. Kemper Fellowship for Teaching Excellence from the University of Missouri.
