= Donal O'Shea =

Canadian mathematician

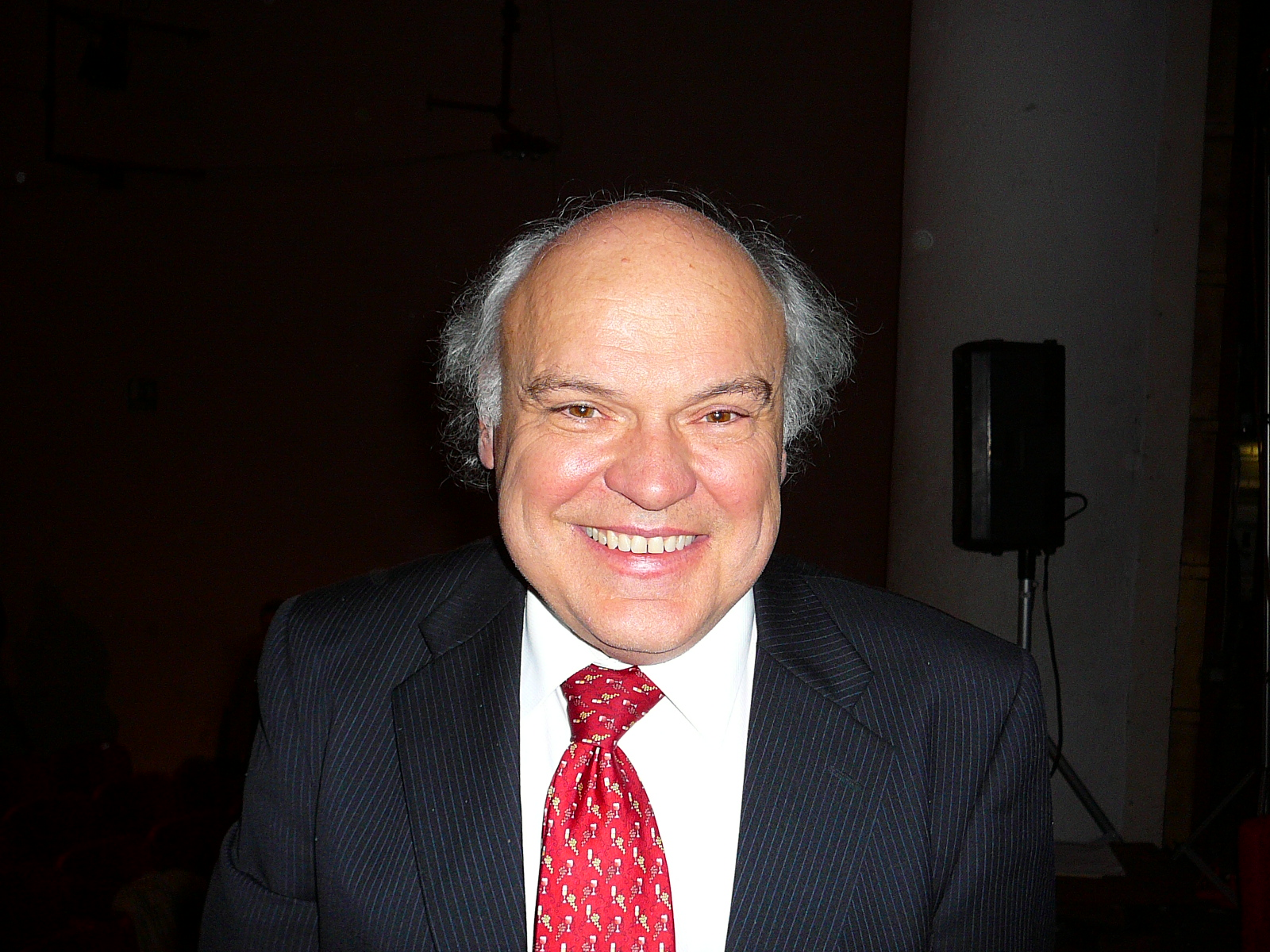
- Donal O'Shea
- Citizenship: United States; Canada; Ireland
- Spouse: Mary Della Barker (m. 1978)
- Children: 4

Academic background
- Education: Harvard College (B.Sc.); Queen's University at Kingston (M.Sc., Ph.D.)
- Thesis: On μ-Equivalent Families of Singularities (1981)
- Doctoral advisor: Albert John Coleman

Donal B. O'Shea is a Canadian mathematician, who is also noted for his bestselling books. He served as the fifth president of New College of Florida in Sarasota, from July 1, 2012, until June 30, 2021. He was succeeded by Patricia Okker on July 1, 2021. Before coming to New College, he served in various roles at Mount Holyoke College, including professor of mathematics, dean of faculty, and vice president for academic affairs.

O'Shea graduated with a B.Sc. from Harvard College, and received a Ph.D. in mathematics from Queen's University in Kingston, Ontario in 1981; his thesis, titled On μ-Equivalent Families of Singularities, was written under the direction of Albert John Coleman.

== Bibliography ==
Some of his best known books are:

- The Poincaré Conjecture: In Search of the Shape of the Universe.

The book has consistently received good reviews.

- David A. Cox, John Little, and Donal O'Shea: Using algebraic geometry, Graduate Texts in Mathematics, vol. 185, Springer-Verlag, 2005.
- David A. Cox, John Little, and Donal O'Shea: Ideals, varieties, and algorithms: an introduction to computational algebraic geometry and commutative algebra, 3rd. edition, Springer Verlag, 2007.
