= Galois Theory (Cox) =

2004 mathematics textbook by David A. Cox

- Author: David A. Cox
- Language: English
- Subject: Galois theory
- Publisher: John Wiley & Sons
- Publication date: 2004 (1st ed.); 2012 (2nd ed.)
- Publication place: United States
- ISBN: 978-1-118-07205-9 (2nd ed.)

Galois Theory is a 2004 mathematics textbook by David A. Cox for undergraduates, on Galois theory. A revised second edition was published in 2012.

== Sources ==
- Giblin, Peter (2016). "Review of Galois Theory". The Mathematical Gazette. 100 (548). The Mathematical Association: 374. doi:10.1017/mag.2016.90. JSTOR 44161840.
- Gouvêa, Fernando Q. (2012). "Review of Galois Theory". MAA Reviews. Mathematical Association of America.
- Kleinert, Werner. Reviews of Galois Theory. Zbl 1057.12002 and Zbl 1247.12006 (separate review of 2nd edition).
