= Caples–Ringling Estates Historic District =

Historic district in Florida, United States

- Caples'–Ringlings' Estates; Historic District
- U.S. National Register of Historic Places
- U.S. Historic district
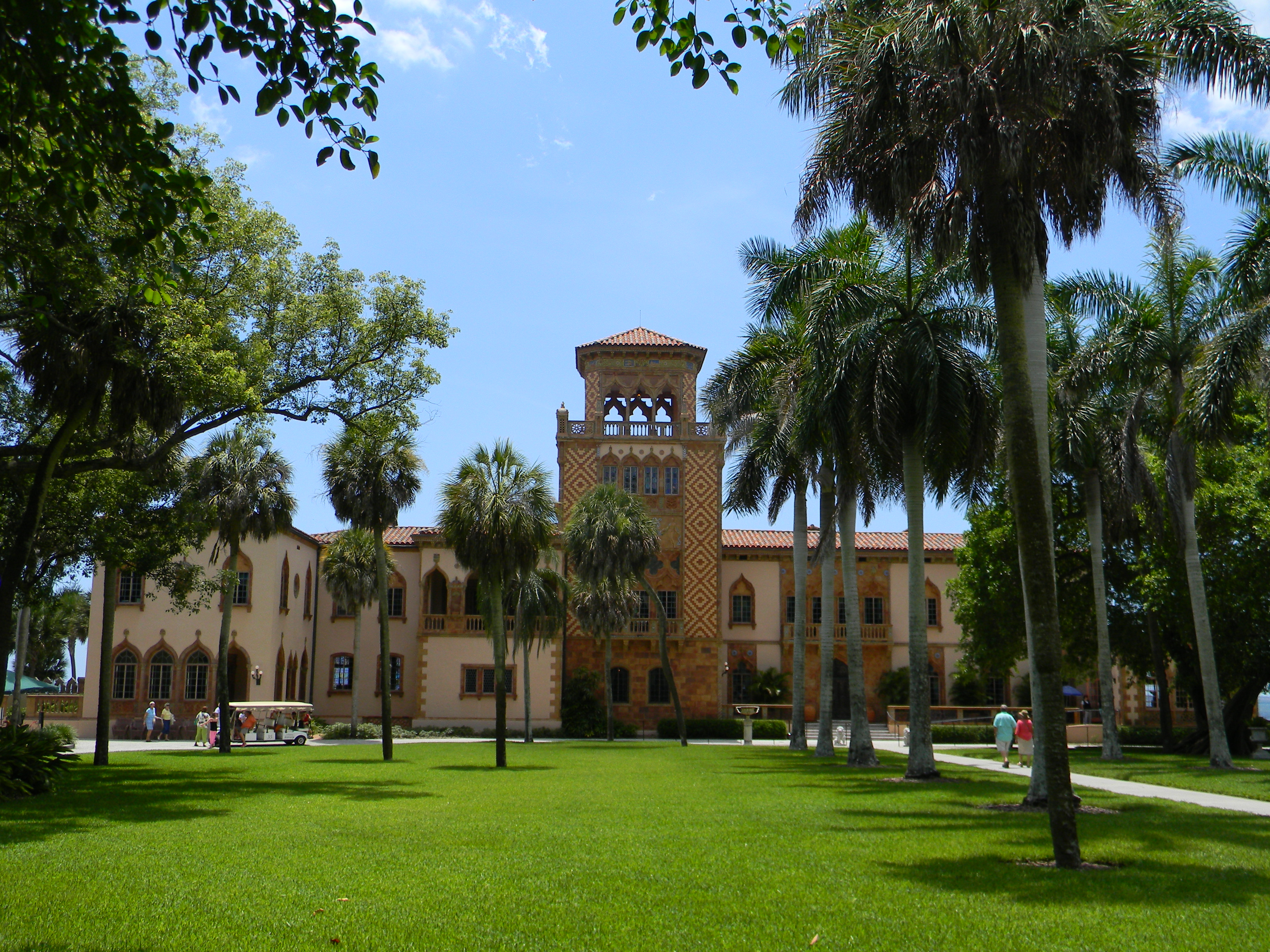
- Ca'd'Zan

- Location within Florida Location within the United States
- Location: Sarasota, Florida
- Coordinates: 27°22′58″N 82°33′40″W
- Area: 1,500 acres (6.1 km^{2})
- NRHP reference No.: 82001039
- Added to NRHP: 15 December 1982

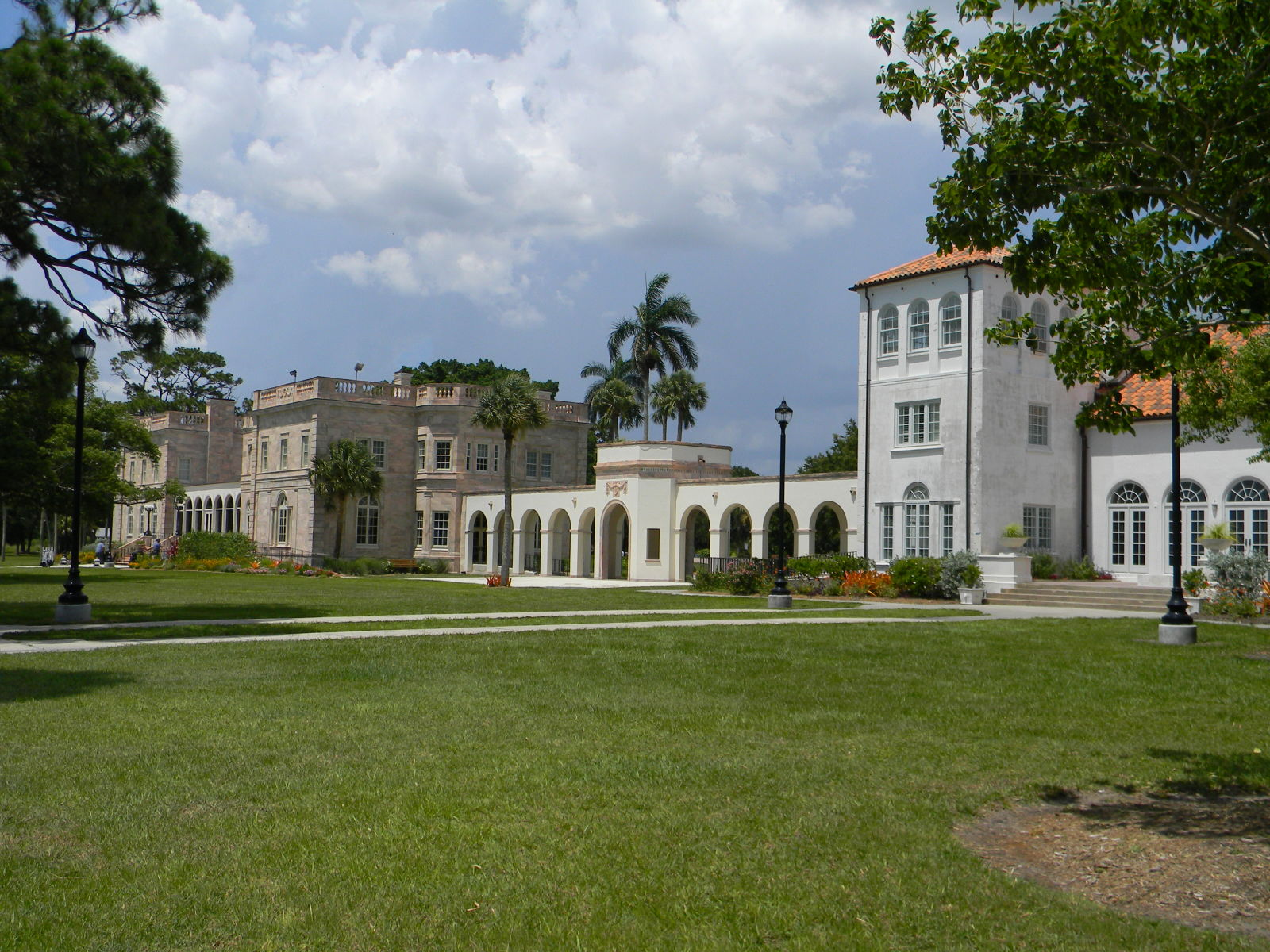
Historic homes of Edith Ringling and Hester Ringling Sanford are connected by an arcade

The Caples'–Ringlings' Estates Historic District comprises the John Ringling Estate, the Edith and Charles Ringling and Hester Ringling Lancaster Sanford Estates, and the Ellen and Ralph Caples Estate as a U.S. historic district located in Sarasota, Florida. The historic designation was given on December 15, 1982. The district is bounded by Sarasota Bay, Tamiami Trail (U.S. Route 41), Parkview Drive, and North Shore Drive. The district contains 18 historic buildings and 5 structures as well as contributing factors. Architecture (including walls and gateways), landscape architecture, art, sculpture, as well as social and humanitarian factors are cited on the 1980 nomination form as the significant qualification factors for listing the district. The district was the first National Register of Historic Places nomination for a site in the city of Sarasota. The estates associated with three of the homes are the part of the New College of Florida campus that is west of Bay Shore Road, all except that of John Ringling.

Two of the homes, Edith's and Hester's, are used regularly for college functions and the third, the home of the Caples, is undergoing restoration so that it also may be used regularly.

== Gallery ==
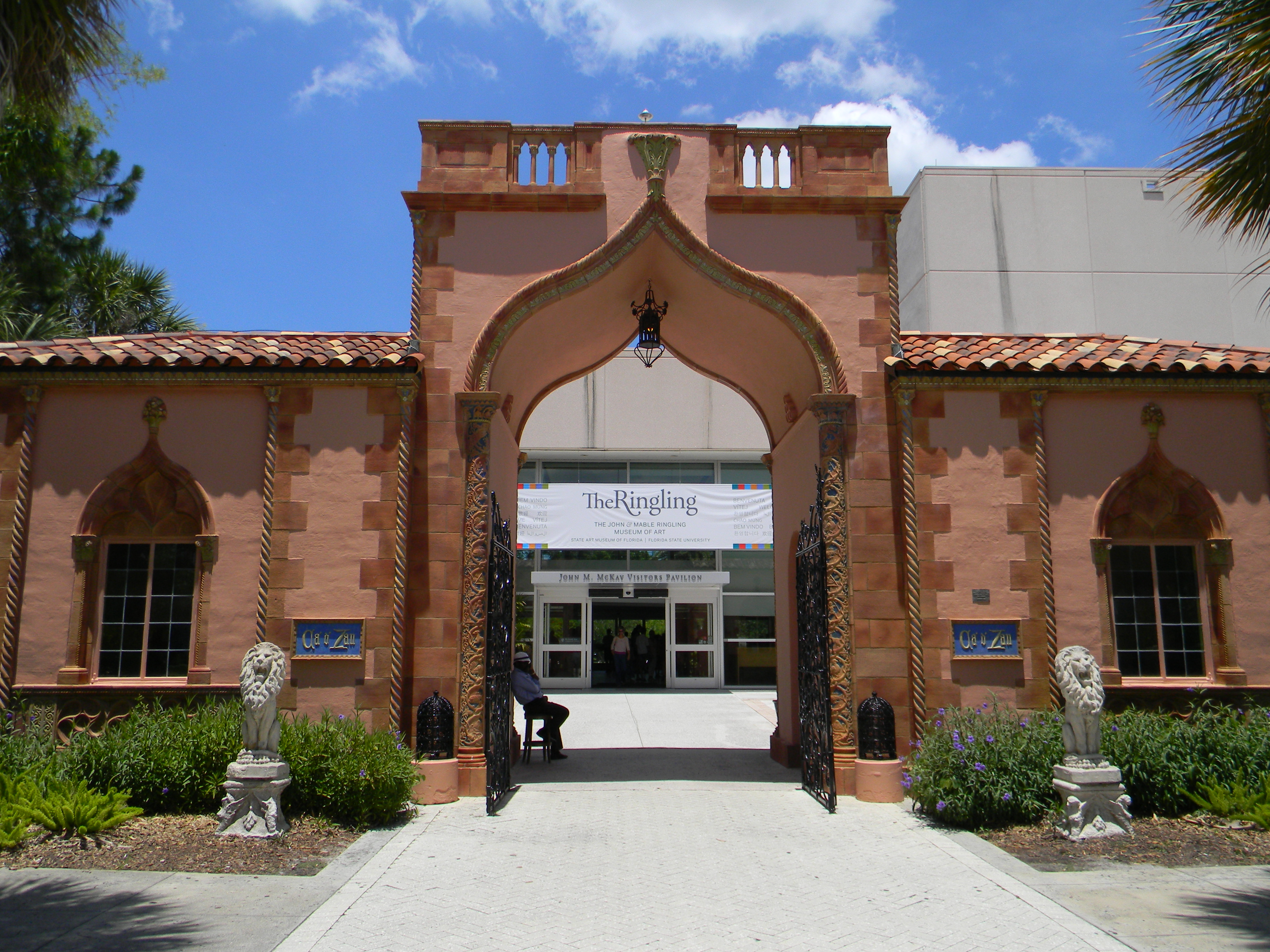
Former gateway to Ca'd'Zan, now the entrance to the John and Mable Ringling Museum of Art complex of the associated museums, a restaurant, and a gift shop

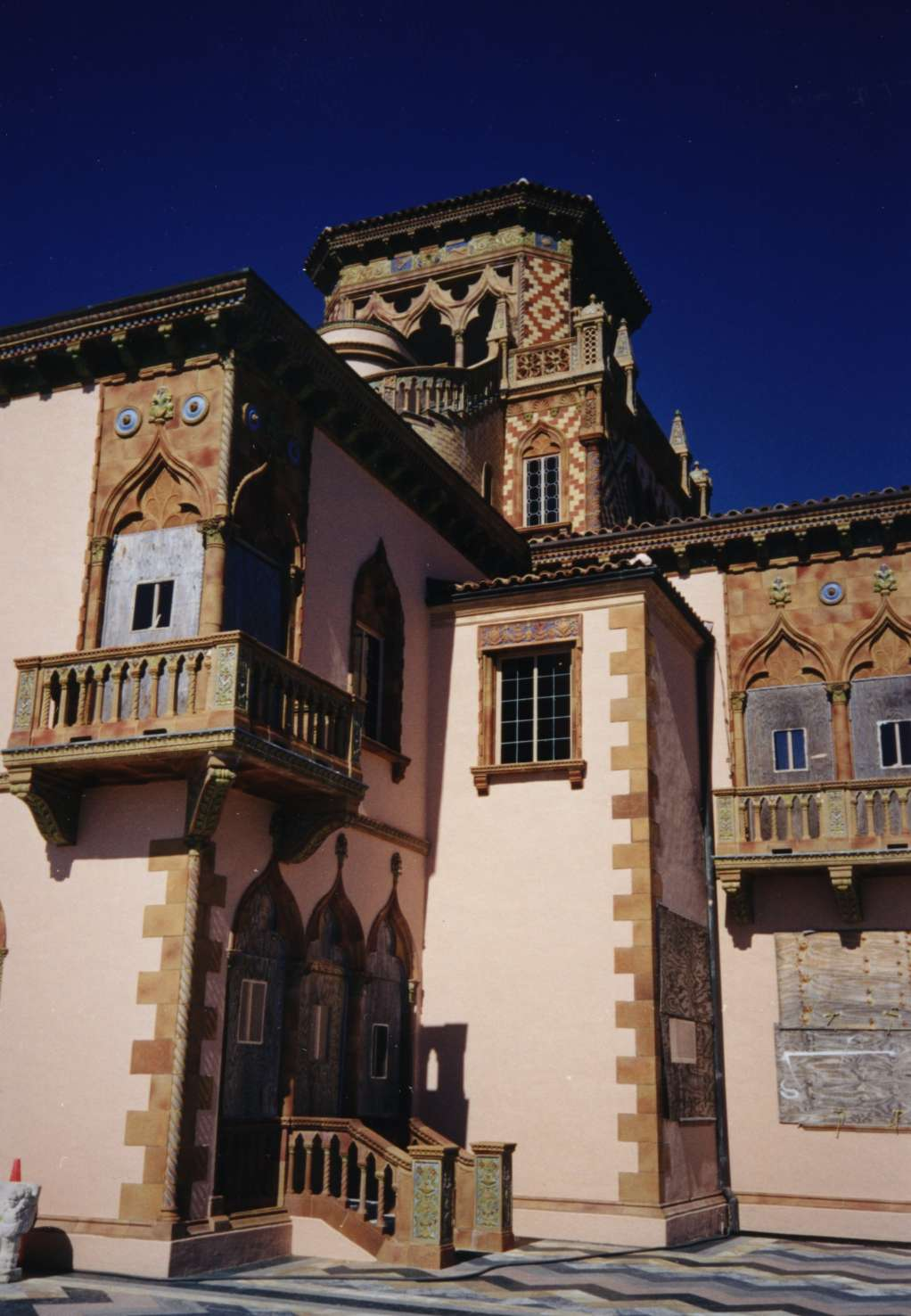
Front entrance to Ca'd'Zan
