= Tom Anderson (Florida politician) =

American politician (born 1932)

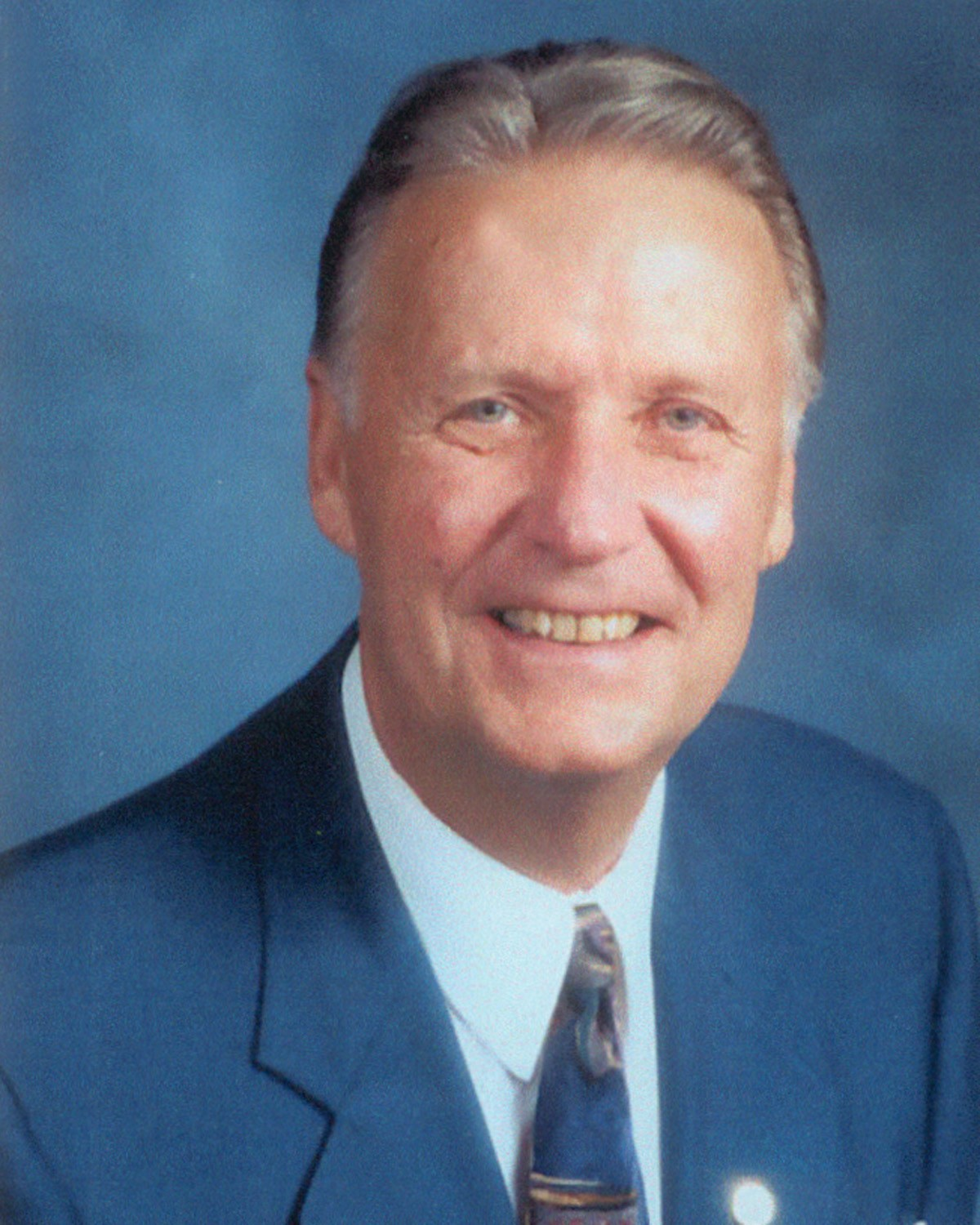

Member of the Florida House of Representatives from the 45th district
- In office November 5, 2002 – November 2, 2010
- Preceded by: Mike Fasano
- Succeeded by: Richard Corcoran

Personal details
- Born: June 30, 1932 (age 94) New York City, New York
- Party: Republican
- Spouse: Alice Christine
- Education: City College of New York (B.A.); George Washington University (M.B.A.)
- Occupation: Businessman, management consultant

Thomas Anderson (born June 30, 1932) is a Republican politician from Florida who served as a member of the Florida House of Representatives from the 45th district from 2002 to 2010.

== Early life ==
Anderson was born in New York City in 1932, and attended City College of New York, graduating with his bachelor's degree in 1954. He later attended George Washington University, receiving his master's of business administration in 1970. Anderson worked as a consultant at the U.S. Department of Energy and the Department of Defense in Washington, D.C., before moving to Dunedin, Florida, in 1982.

In 1990, Anderson was elected to the Dunedin City Commission. In 1994, Anderson announced that he would run for mayor, challenging incumbent Manuel Koutsourais for re-election. However, when Koutsourais declined to run, Anderson was elected unopposed.

== Florida House of Representatives ==
In 2002, when Republican Mike Fasano was unable to seek re-election, Anderson ran to succeed him in the 45th district. Fasano endorsed John Legg, a former legislative aide to Heather Fiorentino, while State Senator Jack Latvala supported Anderson. The race turned into a proxy battle between Latvala and Fasano, whom Latvala argued was not "moderate" enough. Anderson ultimately defeated Legg, winning 55 percent of the vote to his 45 percent, and advanced to the general election, where he faced Democrat Kevin Jensen and Libertarian John Doherty. Anderson defeated both in a landslide, winning 62 percent of the vote to Jensen's 34 percent and Doherty's 4 percent.

Anderson ran for re-election in 2004, and was challenged by Jensen in a rematch of their 2002 campaign. Anderson won re-election by a wide margin, defeating Jensen with 62 percent of the vote.

In 2006, Anderson was challenged by Democrat Chris Hrabovsky, an environmental activist who attracted attention for protesting Walmart stores in the area. Anderson defeated Hrabovsky, winning 59 percent of the vote to his 41 percent.

Anderson was re-elected unopposed in 2008. In 2010, he was term-limited, and was succeeded by Richard Corcoran.
