= Richard Corcoran =

American politician (born 1965)

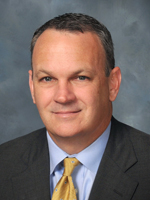
- Official portrait, 2011

President of New College of Florida
- Incumbent
- Assumed office March 2023; Acting: March 2023 – October 2023
- Preceded by: Bradley Thiessen

27th Education Commissioner of Florida
- In office January 8, 2019 – May 1, 2022
- Governor: Ron DeSantis
- Preceded by: Pam Stewart
- Succeeded by: Manny Díaz Jr.

100th Speaker of the Florida House of Representatives
- In office November 22, 2016 – November 20, 2018
- Preceded by: Steve Crisafulli
- Succeeded by: José R. Oliva

Member of the Florida House of Representatives
- In office November 2, 2010 – November 6, 2018
- Preceded by: Tom Anderson
- Succeeded by: Ardian Zika
- Constituency: 45th district (2010–2012); 37th district (2012–2018)

Personal details
- Born: Richard Michael Corcoran; March 16, 1965 (age 61) Toronto, Canada
- Party: Republican
- Spouse: Anne Whitfield
- Children: 6
- Relatives: Michael Corcoran (brother)
- Education: Saint Leo University (BA); Regent University (JD)

Richard Michael Corcoran (born March 16, 1965) is an Canadian-American attorney, education administrator, and former politician. He served as member of the Florida House of Representatives for two districts, he represented the 45th district from 2010 to 2012 and the 37th district from 2012 to 2018. He served as the one hundredth speaker of the Florida House of Representatives from 2016 to 2018. He served as the 27th education commissioner of Florida from 2019 to 2022. He has served as president of New College of Florida since 2023. He is a member of the Republican Party.

== Early life and education ==
He was born and raised in Canada. After age 11 Corcoran resided in Pasco County, Florida, to which his family moved during 1976. His parents were both veterans of World War II. His father had served in the U.S. Army and his mother, a daughter of a British tea-planter, had served in the Women's Auxiliary Air Force of the Royal Air Force during the London Blitz.

After attending and dropping out of the University of Florida, Corcoran earned a bachelor's degree in 1989 from St. Leo College. During 1987–1993, he served six years in the United States Naval Reserve.

In 1996, he earned a Juris Doctor from Regent University School of Law. Three years later he took and passed the Florida Bar.

== Political, legal, and education career ==
=== 1989–2005 ===
Corcoran's first job after graduation from St. Leo was with Rep. John Renke of New Port Richey, state Republican house leader, until the election defeat of Renke by Phil Mishkin in a race orchestrated by T. K. Wetherell, the house speaker and future FSU president. Corcoran then worked as a legislative aide for his friend Paul Hawkes, representative in the Florida House from 1990 to 1994. Corcoran ran the 1994 initial election campaign for Mike Fasano to the Florida House (who later would become majority leader and senate president). Between 1996 and 1998, Corcoran was deputy to Daniel Webster, the first Republican elected as house speaker in a century.

In 1998, when for the first time he sought to be elected to a seat in the Florida house of representatives, Corcoran ran his own campaign. He lost the race in the Republican primary to Nancy Argenziano, who was elected to the 1996–2002 term and went on to be elected a state senator in 2002.

Corcoran was admitted to the Florida Bar on September 21, 1999, three years after completing law school.

He worked as outside counsel for former House Speaker Tom Feeney in 2002.

=== 2006–2010 ===
In 2006, Corcoran worked for candidate Marco Rubio, where he was involved in writing and promoting Rubio's political tract 100 Innovative Ideas for Florida's Future. After that year's election, he became chief of staff to the new House Speaker. Corcoran resigned to prepare for a 2007 state senate election bid for the seat being vacated by Argenziano's appointment to the Public Service Commission, but Corcoran dropped out of the race prior to the general election, which would be won by Charles Dean.

When he was chief aide to Marco Rubio, Corcoran's spending of Republican Party of Florida funds drew scrutiny. His spending on flights, hotels, and restaurants from party funds in 2015 and 2016 also drew critics. Corcoran rejected suggestions that the spending (such as an $8,000 meal at The French Laundry in Napa Valley) was excessive.

Corcoran also was hired by future governor Rick Scott to do legal work for Solantic.

=== 2010–2018 ===
When incumbent state representative Tom Anderson was unable to seek re-election due to term limits in 2010, Corcoran ran a successful campaign to succeed him in the 45th District, which included parts of southern Pasco County and northern Pinellas County. During his term, Corcoran secured promises from fellow Republican representatives to elect him to the office of speaker for the 2016–2018 legislative session if he won that election. His leading rival for the position was fellow freshman representative Matt Gaetz. At the time, Corcoran released an 80-page reform manifesto entitled Blue Print Florida.

In 2011, he was hired as counsel at the Tampa offices of the law firm Broad and Cassel.

When the state legislative districts were redrawn in 2012, Corcoran was drawn into the 37th District, which included some of the areas in Pasco County that he represented in the 45th District. Corcoran faced a challenge from Strother Hammond in the Republican primary. He was endorsed for re-election by The Tampa Tribune. Corcoran defeated Hammond, gathering nearly 84% of the vote. Corcoran was subsequently re-elected without opposition in both 2014 and 2016.

During his time as representative, he led an effort to oppose Medicaid expansion. He criticized Enterprise Florida and Visit Florida.

As he had secured promised commitments from fellow representatives while campaigning in 2010, following his 2016 election, Corcoran became speaker of the Florida House of Representatives for the 2016–2018 legislative session. Orlando Weekly wrote that as House leader, Corcoran had the "pugnacious manner and determination that have become his hallmarks". In 2017, Senator Jack Latvala said, "I've been up there [at the Florida Legislature] 22 years, and he has flat picked more fights with more people than anybody I've ever seen before." In 2018, Corcoran described the Florida teachers union as "disgusting", "repugnant", and "downright evil". In a 2017 profile recounting his shouting and cursing, Corcoran told a reporter, "I'm the most disruptive person."

In a January 2018 article, Corcoran stated that, between 2007 and 2018 he witnessed "probably less than ten" legislators engaging in sexual harassment and misconduct in the Florida legislature. Corcoran stated in the article, "I did report, I did talk to the legislators involved and it was resolved", Corcoran said, adding later that "to the extent that there was a violation, that violation needed to be addressed, and it was addressed. And the behavior was curbed." Corcoran stated that these incidents happened before he became speaker. When he became speaker, the House imposed stricter sexual harassment rules for its members in 2016. In the same article, it was reported that "Corcoran has been the most outspoken Republican in the Florida Capitol denouncing sexual misconduct, especially in the Florida Senate." Two months later, in March 2018, Corcoran called out the Florida Senate for endangering legislation to crack down on sexual harassment. "How does a chamber that was caught up in that much scandal not take up sexual harassment?" Corcoran said to Politico in 2018, referring to two state senators who resigned after being accused of sexual misconduct. Corcoran was the first top GOP legislative leader to speak out over sexual harassment at that time.

In January 2018, Corcoran's PAC, Watchdog USA, began airing ads as he explored a run for governor. In April, before officially announcing a run, his candidacy was endorsed by Matt Gaetz. Ultimately, Corcoran endorsed Adam Putnam in the race, which was won by Ron DeSantis.

=== 2018–2022 ===
On December 6, 2018, Governor-elect of Florida Ron DeSantis announced he would nominate Corcoran to be education commissioner. Corcoran was unanimously confirmed as education commissioner by the Florida Board of Education on December 17, 2018, and took office on January 8, 2019, upon the effectiveness of the resignation of his predecessor, Pam Stewart.

Corcoran was appointed by a unanimous vote of the Florida Board of Education, which is appointed by the governor. Democratic state representative Anna V. Eskamani criticized his appointment, saying that Corcoran had "no professional background in education". Other critics pointed to potential conflicts of interest due to his wife's position as CEO of a charter school. Anne Corcoran, who founded a classical liberal arts charter school because she believed in that model of education, was unpaid for her role. Corcoran dismissed previous allegations that her husband has a conflict of interest, saying her family likely loses money for the unpaid time she dedicates to her charter school.

Corcoran's tenure was characterized by contentious relations with a number of school districts and superintendents.

Corcoran's management of school reopening during the COVID-19 pandemic was a source of friction. On July 7, 2020, President Donald Trump tweeted "Schools must open in the fall", that same day Corcoran ordered all public and private brick-and-mortar schools to reopen in August for at least five days per week and provide a "full-array" of services. On August 7, 2020, Corcoran delivered a letter that denied Hillsborough County School Board's request to open the school year exclusively online. In April 2021, Corcoran wrote to school districts and stated that there was no strong evidence that mask wearing slowed the spread of COVID-19 at schools.

In March 2021, the Duval County school district removed a secondary school teacher from classroom teaching. While the district did not specify the cause of removal, a Southern Poverty Law Center lawsuit alleged that the cause was Donfrio's posting of a Black Lives Matter flag and anti-racist content in her teaching. Responding to questions following a speech he delivered at Hillsdale College in early May, Corcoran announced that it was he who made the decision to fire Donfrio: "We made sure she was terminated and now we're being sued by every one of the liberal left groups who say it's freedom of speech issue" and Corcoran accused the teacher of having her "entire classroom memorialized to Black Lives Matter".

In May 2021, Corcoran submitted an application to succeed John E. Thrasher as president of Florida State University, and the selection committee advanced him along with eight others for on campus interviews. Media reports portrayed Corcoran as the inside candidate. On May 13, the Southern Association of Colleges and Schools addressed a letter of concern to the Florida Board of Governors describing a potential conflict of interest due to Corcoran's membership on the board that appointed the selection committee and that would decide the appointment. Corcoran was not among the finalists named on May 15.

On May 1, 2022, Corcoran submitted his resignation as education commissioner. In July 2022, Corcoran joined the litigation and government relations law firm, Continental PLLC, as a partner.

==== Jefferson County bid-rigging investigation ====
In 2022, Corcoran came under scrutiny when the department of education was shown to be in talks with MGT Consulting, a firm led by Corcoran's longtime colleague Trey Traviesa, for some time before the bidding on a multimillion-dollar educational services contract was opened for just a single week, a situation that appeared to allow the firm preferential access. Out of 25 firms sent a request for quotes, only MGT responded within the one-week deadline. One week prior to the bidding being opened, Corcoran had hosted a closed-door meeting between Traviesa, Jefferson County school officials, and charter school lobbyist Ralph Arza.

State investigators learned of the improprieties when a new company formed by two of Corcoran's deputies, Strategic Initiatives Partners, also applied for the Jefferson County contract on the final day of bidding. The department of education inspector general opened a probe as a conflict-of-interest investigation into Strategic Initiatives Partners and issued an inconclusive report. The two Strategic Initiatives principals working in Corcoran's department resigned, and Gov. DeSantis' office declared the matter closed. However, state Democratic lawmakers then requested that the inspector general of the U.S. Department of Education look further into the issue because the funds for the contract were allocated from federal COVID-19 relief funds.

On May 1, 2022, Corcoran stepped down as education commissioner. In August 2023, a federal investigation discovered that the state level of the investigation did not proceed after his resignation.

=== 2023 to present ===
==== New College of Florida ====
On January 6, 2023, Florida Governor Ron DeSantis appointed six new members to the board of trustees for New College of Florida, the small honors college of the state university system. At its first meeting, on January 31, 2023, the new board fired President Patricia Okker, who had only held the position for 19 months. Bradley Thiessen became interim president until the board installed Richard Corcoran as its interim president beginning in March 2023. Corcoran was to be paid a base salary of $699,000, which is $400,000 more than his predecessor made, and the new board of trustees promised him large scheduled bonuses if confirmed as president.

At the time the interim appointment was announced, Corcoran was still registered as a lobbyist for educational concerns, including Charter Schools USA, Polk County Public Schools, and the University of Miami, among three dozen clients whose relationships he had reaffirmed earlier that month.

In August 2023, two days after the New College presidential search committee named Corcoran one of three finalists for the full-time position, news broke that a federal grand jury had begun investigating the Jefferson County bid-rigging scandal. The federal probe showed that following Corcoran's resignation, state officials tasked with investigating the scandal had never interviewed anyone involved in it and never pulled records concerning the case.

In October 2023, after being the New College of Florida's interim president for nine months, Corcoran was named the school's president with the enhanced contract, including a salary of $1.3 million among other allowances and bonuses in the financial package.

Corcoran is leading efforts to remake the college following the model of Hillsdale College, a private nonsectarian Christian liberal arts college in Michigan that has a core curriculum that includes the Great Books, the U.S. Constitution, theology, biology, chemistry, and physics, and is a member of the advisory board to Project 2025.

== Political positions on education issues ==
Corcoran is an advocate for charter school expansion and private school vouchers. His brother Michael Corcoran is a lobbyist for a charter school management company, Accelerated Learning Solutions. His wife Anne Corcoran helped found a charter school for whom she acts as CEO. While speaker of the Florida House of Representatives, Corcoran criticized a Florida Education Association lawsuit and described teachers unions as "literally trying to destroy the lives of 100,000 children. Most of them are minorities, and all of them are poor... It is downright evil."

In 2017, Corcoran passed his Schools of Hope bill, which funds new charter schools to open near public schools reporting weak results in standardized assessments. In the 2018 legislative session, he passed his Hope Scholarships bill, which funds private school vouchers for bullied public school students.

== Opposition to sanctuary cities ==
During the run-up to the 2018 Florida gubernatorial campaign, Corcoran's Watchdog USA PAC ran an advertisement targeting so-called sanctuary cities. During the 2018 legislative session, he backed HP9, which pre-empted local policies about non-cooperation with United States Immigration and Customs Enforcement, ICE.

== Personal life ==
Corcoran previously resided in Land o' Lakes, Florida, but has relocated to Manatee County since being named president of New College.

His wife, Anne Whitfield Corcoran, is active in the Barney Charter School Initiative affiliated with Hillsdale College. They have six children, who were homeschooled and then attended Classical Prep in Spring Hill, Florida, a charter school that Anne Corcoran founded and where she acted as CEO. She was an attorney with Nelson Mullins in Tallahassee. As of September 2025, she had her own firm, the Corcoran Law Firm, in Manatee County.

Richard Corcoran's brother, Michael Corcoran, is a political and corporate lobbyist in Tallahassee and Tampa who founded the firm now known as Corcoran Partners. Corcoran's sister Jacqueline is a former Washington, D.C., political operative and a current lobbyist with Corcoran Partners.

Florida House of Representatives
Preceded by Tom Anderson	Member of the Florida House of Representatives from the 45th district 2010–2012	Succeeded by Randolph Bracy
Preceded by Scott Plakon	Member of the Florida House of Representatives from the 37th district 2012–2018	Succeeded by Ardian Zika
Political offices
Preceded by Steve Crisafulli	Speaker of the Florida House of Representatives; 2016–2018	Succeeded by José R. Oliva
Preceded by Pam Stewart	Education Commissioner of Florida; 2019–2022	Succeeded by Manny Díaz Jr.
Academic offices
Preceded by Bradley Thiessen	President New College of Florida; 2023–present	Incumbent
