= John B. Little (mathematician) =

American mathematician (born 1956)

John Brittain Little (born 1956) is a retired American mathematician, the author of several books in algebraic geometry and the history of mathematics. He is distinguished professor emeritus in the departments of mathematics and computer science at the College of the Holy Cross.

== Education and career ==
Little was born January 15, 1956, in Elmira, New York. He majored in mathematics at Haverford College, graduating in 1976, and completed a Ph.D. at Yale University in 1980. His dissertation, Translation Manifolds and the Converse of Abel's Theorem, was supervised by Bernard Saint-Donat.

He joined the College of the Holy Cross as an assistant professor in 1980, became an associate professor in 1986, and was promoted to full professor in 2003. He was Anthony and Renee Marlon Professor in the Sciences from 2012 to 2015.

== Books ==
Little's textbooks include:

- Using Algebraic Geometry (with David Cox and Donal O'Shea, Springer, Graduate Texts in Mathematics, 1998; 2nd ed., 2005)
- Ideals, Varieties, and Algorithms: An Introduction to Computational Algebraic Geometry and Commutative Algebra (with David Cox and Donal O'Shea, Springer, 1992; 4th ed., 2015)
- A Course in Linear Algebra (with David B. Damiano, Dover, 2011)
- Toric Varieties (with David Cox and Henry K. Schenck, AMS, Graduate Studies in Mathematics, 2011)
- Modeling and Data Analysis: An Introduction with Environmental Applications (American Mathematical Society, Holy Cross Bookshelf 41, 2019)

In his retirement he has shifted his interests to focus more on the history of mathematics and the translation of works in ancient Greek mathematics. His books in this area include:

- Practical Geometry (Clavius) (Holy Cross Bookshelf 57, 2022)
- Pappus of Alexandria, Book VIII of the Mathematical Collection (Holy Cross Bookshelf 62, 2023)
- Pappus of Alexandria, Book III of the Mathematical Collection (Holy Cross Bookshelf 63, 2023)

== Recognition ==
Little's book Ideals, Varieties, and Algorithms was the 2016 winner of the Leroy P. Steele Prize for mathematical exposition.

Little received the 2020 Paul R. Halmos – Lester R. Ford Award for his paper "The many lives of the twisted cubic", published in The American Mathematical Monthly.
