= Bradley Thiessen (statistician) =

American statistician and academic administrator

President of the New College of Florida
- Interim
- In office January 31, 2023 – March 2023
- Preceded by: Patricia Okker
- Succeeded by: Richard Corcoran (interim)

Personal details
- Born: Bradley Adam Thiessen
- Education: St. Ambrose University; University of Iowa
- Website: bradthiessen.com
- Scientific career
- Fields: Statistics
- Workplaces: St. Ambrose University; University of Hawaiʻi at Hilo
- Thesis: Relationship between test security policies and test score manipulations (2008)
- Doctoral advisor: Timothy Neri Ansley

Bradley Adam Thiessen is an American statistician and academic administrator. He served as the interim president of the New College of Florida from January 2023 to March 2023.

== Life ==
Thiessen earned a bachelor's degree in secondary mathematics education at the St. Ambrose University. He earned a master's degree and Ph.D. in educational measurement and statistics from the University of Iowa. His 2008 dissertation was titled, Relationship between test security policies and test score manipulations. Timothy Neri Ansley was his doctoral advisor.

Thiessen worked at the St. Ambrose University for 14 years as the university assessment coordinator and a faculty member in the department of mathematics and statistics. He joined the New College of Florida in July 2016 as the president's chief of staff, and a professor of statistics. In August 2016, he became its first director of institutional performance assessment. On January 2, 2020, he became the director of institutional research at the University of Hawaiʻi at Hilo. On January 31, 2023, Thiessen was appointed as the interim president of the New College of Florida by the board of trustees, succeeding Patricia Okker. He served until March 2023 when he was replaced by Richard Corcoran.

In July 2024, Thiessen joined Florida Polytechnic University as interim provost. On May 8, 2025, he was named Provost and Vice President for Academic Affairs at Florida Polytechnic University.
