= Mark Stern =

American mathematician

Mark A. Stern is an American mathematician whose focus has been on geometric analysis, Yang–Mills theory, Hodge theory, and string theory.

One of Stern's foremost accomplishments is his proof (joint with Leslie D. Saper) of the Zucker conjecture concerning locally symmetric spaces. Since about 2000, Stern has focused on geometric problems arising in physics, ranging from harmonic theory to string theory and supersymmetry.

Stern has taught at Duke University since 1985, and was promoted to professor in 1992. He has been the mathematics department chairman but has focused primarily on research and teaching, with major grant support from the National Science Foundation. At Duke, he teaches such courses as multivariable calculus.

Since 2010, Stern has spoken to advanced math audiences at the Newton Institute, CUNY Graduate Center, U.C. Irvine, Johns Hopkins, the University of Maryland, and multiple academic groups.

== Academic background ==
Prior to Duke, Stern was a member of the Institute for Advanced Study at Princeton, where he received his Ph.D. in 1985. His thesis advisor was S.T. Yau. Stern studied math at Texas A&M, where he received his B.S. degree in 1980, before moving to Princeton. Stern grew up in Dallas, where he graduated from St. Mark's School of Texas.

Stern is a fellow of the American Mathematical Society and has won an Alfred P. Sloan Fellowship and a Presidential Young Investigator Award. In 2014, Stern was inducted into the Academy of Distinguished Former Students at Texas A&M.

== Recent articles ==
- M.A. Stern and B. Charbonneau, Asymptotic Hodge Theory of Vector Bundles, Comm. in Anal. and Geom., vol. 23 no. 3 (2015), pp. 559–609
- B Charbonneau and M Stern, Asymptotic Hodge Theory of Vector Bundles, Geometry and Topology, vol. 23 no. 3 (2015), pp. 559–609 [DG/1111.0591], [0591] [abs]
- A Degeratu and M Stern, Witten Spinors on Nonspin Manifolds, Communications in Mathematical Physics, vol. 324 no. 2 (2013), pp. 301–350, ISSN 0010-3616 [DG/1112.0194], [0194], [doi] [abs]
- I Melnikov, C Quigley, S Sethi and M Stern, Target spaces from chiral gauge theories, Journal of High Energy Physics, vol. 2013 no. 2 (December 12, 2012), pp. 1–56, ISSN 1126-6708 [1212], [doi] [abs]
- M.A. Stern, Geometry of stable Yang—Mills connections, in Advanced Lectures in Mathematics Volume 21: Advances in Geometric Analysis (July, 2012), ISBN 9781571462480 [abs]
- C Quigley, S Sethi and M Stern, Novel Branches of (0,2) Theories, JHEP, vol. 1209 no. 064 (2012), ISSN 1029-8479 [3228], [doi] [abs]
- M Stern, Geometry of minimal energy Yang-Mills connections, Journal of Differential Geometry, vol. 86 no. 1 (2010), pp. 163–188, ISSN 0022-040X [arXiv:0808.0667] [abs]
- M Stern, Fixed point theorems from a de Rham perspective, Asian Journal of Mathematics, vol. 13 no. 1 (2009), pp. 065–088, ISSN 1093-6106
- M.A. Stern, B fields from a Luddite perspective, in Proceedings of 3rd International Symposium on Quantum Theory and Symmetries (QTS3) (2004)
- S Paban, S Sethi and M Stern, I. Non-commutativity and supersymmetry, Journal of High Energy Physics, vol. 6 no. 3 (2002), pp. 183–200 [abs]
- MA Stern, Quantum Mechanical Mirror Symmetry, D Branes, and B fields, eprint (2002) [02091292]
- R Britto-Pacumio, A Maloney, A Strominger and M Stern, Spinning bound states of two and three black holes, Journal of High Energy Physics, vol. 5 no. 11 (2001), pp. XLIV-19, ISSN 1029-8479 [hep-th/0106099] [abs]
- W Pardon and M Stern, Pure hodge structure on the L2-cohomology of varieties with isolated singularities, Journal fur die Reine und Angewandte Mathematik, vol. 533 (2001), pp. 55–80
- M Stern and P Yi, Counting Yang-Mills dyons with index theorems, Physical Review D - Particles, Fields, Gravitation and Cosmology, vol. 62 no. 12 (2000), pp. 1–15, ISSN 0556-2821 [hep-th/0005275] [abs]
- S Sethi and M Stern, Invariance theorems for supersymmetric Yang-Mills theories, Advances in Theoretical and Mathematical Physics, vol. 4 no. 2 (2000), pp. 1–12, ISSN 1095-0761 [hep-th/0001189] [abs]
- S Sethi and M Stern, The structure of the D0-D4 bound state, Nuclear Physics B, vol. 578 no. 1-2 (2000), pp. 163–198 [hep-th/0002131] [abs]
- S Sethi and M Stern, Supersymmetry and the Yang-Mills effective action at finite N, Journal of High Energy Physics, vol. 3 no. 6 (1999), pp. XIV-16, ISSN 1029-8479 [hep-th/99030409] [abs]
- S Paban, S Sethi and M Stern, Summing up instantons in three-dimensional Yang-Mills theories, Advances in Theoretical and Mathematical Physics, vol. 3 no. 2 (1999), pp. 1–18, ISSN 1095-0761 [abs]
- S Sethi and M Stern, D-brane bound states redux, Communications in Mathematical Physics, vol. 194 no. 3 (1998), pp. 675–705 [abs]
- S Paban, S Sethi and M Stern, Constraints from extended supersymmetry in quantum mechanics, Nuclear Physics B, vol. 534 no. 1-2 (1998), pp. 137–154 [abs]
- S Paban, S Sethi and M Stern, Supersymmetry and higher derivative terms in the effective action of Yang-Mills theories, Journal of High Energy Physics, vol. 2 no. 6 (1998), pp. XXII-6, ISSN 1029-8479 [abs]
- S Sethi and M Stern, A comment on the spectrum of H-monopoles, Physics Letters, Section B: Nuclear, Elementary Particle and High-Energy Physics, vol. 398 no. 1-2 (1997), pp. 47–51 [abs]
- S Sethi, M Stern and E Zaslow, Monopole and dyon bound states in N = 2 supersymmetric Yang-Mills theories, Nuclear Physics, Section B, vol. 457 no. 3 (1995), pp. 484–510, ISSN 0550-3213 [doi] [abs]
- M Stern, Lefschetz formulae for arithmetic varieties, Inventiones Mathematicae, vol. 115 no. 1 (1994), pp. 241–296, ISSN 0020-9910 [doi]
- M Stern, L2-index theorems on locally symmetric spaces, Inventiones Mathematicae, vol. 96 no. 2 (1989), pp. 231–282, ISSN 0020-9910 [doi]
- S. Paban, S. Sethi, and M. Stern, Non-commutativity and Supersymmetry, JHEP, 0203, (2002), 012 [0201259]
- Bill Pardon, Mark A Stern, Pure Hodge structures on the L2-cohomology of varieties with isolated singularities., J. Reine Angew. Math. 533 (2001) 55–80.
- Sonia Paban, Savdeep Sethi, and Mark A. Stern, Summing Instantons in 3 dimensional Yang-Mills theories, Adv. Theor. Math. Phys, vol. 3, (1999). [hep-th/9808119] [abs]
- S. Paban, S. Sethi, Mark A Stern, Supersymmetry and higher derivative terms in the effective action of Yang-Mills, J. High Energy Physics. 06:12 (1998)
- Mark A. Stern, L^2-Cohomology and index theory of noncompact manifolds, Proceedings of Symposia in Pure Math. 54 (1993), 559-575
- L. Saper, Mark A. Stern, Appendix to an article of Rapaport, Zeta functions of Picard Modular Varieties, R.P. Langlands and D. Ramakrishnan ed. CRM, Montreal (1992)
- W. Pardon and Mark A. Stern, L^2-d-bar-cohomology of complex projective varieties, J. Am. Math. Soc. 4 (1991), 603-621
- Mark A. Stern, Eta invariants and hermitian locally symmetric spaces, J. Diff. Geom. 31 (1990), 771-789
- L. Saper and Mark A. Stern, L^2 cohomology of arithmetic varieties, Annals of Mathematics 132 (1990), 1-69
- Mark A. Stern, L^2 index theorems on locally symmetric spaces, Inventiones 96 (1989), 231-282
- L.Saper and Mark A. Stern, L^2 cohomology of arithmetic varieties, Proc. Natl. Acad. Sci. 84 (1987), 551

== See also ==
- Notable alumni of St. Mark's School of Texas
