= Cox ring =

Universal homogenous coordinate ring of a projective variety

In algebraic geometry, a Cox ring (or total coordinate ring) is a sort of universal homogeneous coordinate ring for a projective variety, and is (roughly speaking) a direct sum of the spaces of sections of all isomorphism classes of line bundles.

Cox rings were introduced by Hu and Keel in 2000, based on an earlier construction by David A. Cox in 1995 for toric varieties.
