= Mike Michalson =

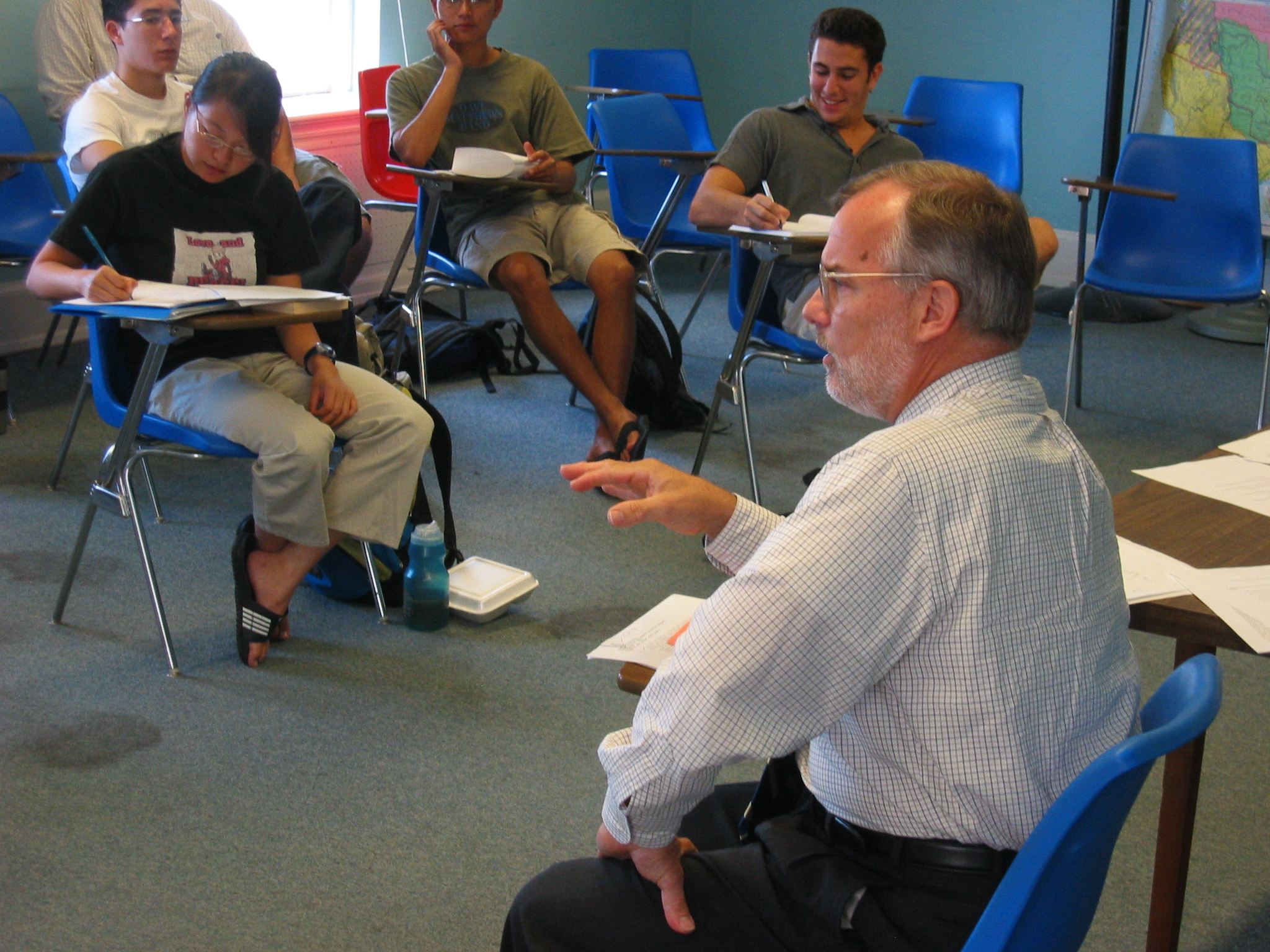
Michalson gives a lecture in 2003.

Gordon E. "Mike" Michalson Jr. is a past president of New College of Florida. He was appointed on January 7, 2003, selected by the board of trustees in a 13-month national search. Michalson, Professor of Humanities at New College, served as Acting President from July 14, 2001, to Sept. 29, 2001 and as president from Sept. 30, 2001 to June 30, 2012. He served as Dean and Warden of the school from 1992 to 1997 (when it was known as New College of the University of South Florida). Prior to that, he taught at Oberlin College for 15 years, where he chaired the Department of Religion. He continues to teach at New College.

Michalson is an Immanuel Kant scholar, producing two secondary works on Kant's religious thought: Fallen Freedom: Kant on Radical Evil and Moral Regeneration and Kant and the Problem of God.

Michalson counts Jeffrey Stout and Cornel West among his friends. The three attended Princeton together.

== See also ==
Gordon E. Michalson, Jr. - Faculty profile, New College of Florida
