= New College of Florida =

Public liberal arts college in Sarasota, Florida, US

Coordinates: 27°23′7″N 82°33′44″W

- Latin: Novum Collegium Floridense MCMLX; English: New College of Florida 1960
- Former names: New College (1960–1975); New College of the University of South Florida (1975–2001)
- Type: Public liberal arts college
- Established: October 11, 1960; 66 years ago
- Parent institution: State University System of Florida
- Accreditation: SACS
- Academic affiliations: COPLAC
- Endowment: $49.8 million (2023)
- President: Richard Corcoran
- Faculty: 100 full time, 20 part time (fall 2023)
- Students: 710 (fall 2023)
- Undergraduates: 710
- Postgraduates: 22
- Location: Sarasota, Florida, United States
- Campus: 144 acres (0.6 km^{2}); Small city
- Newspaper: Catalyst
- Colors: Blue and white
- Nickname: Mighty Banyans (since 2023)
- Sporting affiliations: NAIA – Sun, ICSA – SAISA conference
- Mascot: The Mighty Banyan (since 2023)
- Website: www.ncf.edu

The New College of Florida is a public liberal arts college in Sarasota, Florida, United States.

Founded in 1960, it opened in 1964 and was a private college. It ran into financial difficulty in the 1970s and was merged into the University of South Florida. In 2001, it became an autonomous college within the state university system of Florida, and was designated by statute as "the residential liberal arts honors college" for the state. Division of land holdings and sharing of some facilities followed for creation of a satellite campus for the University of South Florida that would become its Sarasota-Manatee campus on much of the Seagate subdivision and some of The Uplands subdivision.

In 2023, the state government of Florida under Governor Ron DeSantis summarily replaced the New College board of trustees in an attempt to transform the honors college into a conservative institution modeled on Hillsdale College, a private, Evangelical Christian school. Nearly 40% of the faculty resigned.

The college has the smallest student enrollment in the State University System of Florida; as of 2026, it has 710 students and 94 faculty members for student-faculty ratio of roughly 8:1.

The college is a member of the Council of Public Liberal Arts Colleges.

== History ==
New College was founded in 1960 as a private college for academically talented students. Financial assistance was provided by the United Church of Christ. George F. Baughman served as the first president from 1961 to 1965.

Open to students of all races, genders, and religious affiliations, New College opened its doors in 1964 to a premier class of 101 students. Faculty members included the historian and philosopher Arnold J. Toynbee, who left retirement to join the charter faculty.

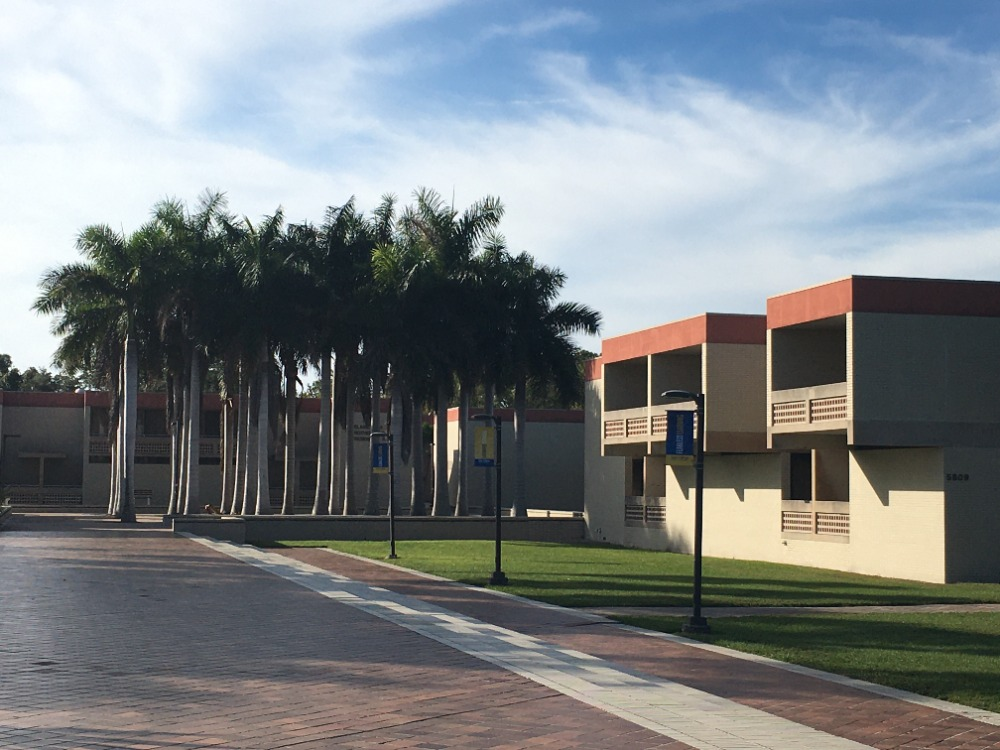
I. M. Pei Dormitories in 2021

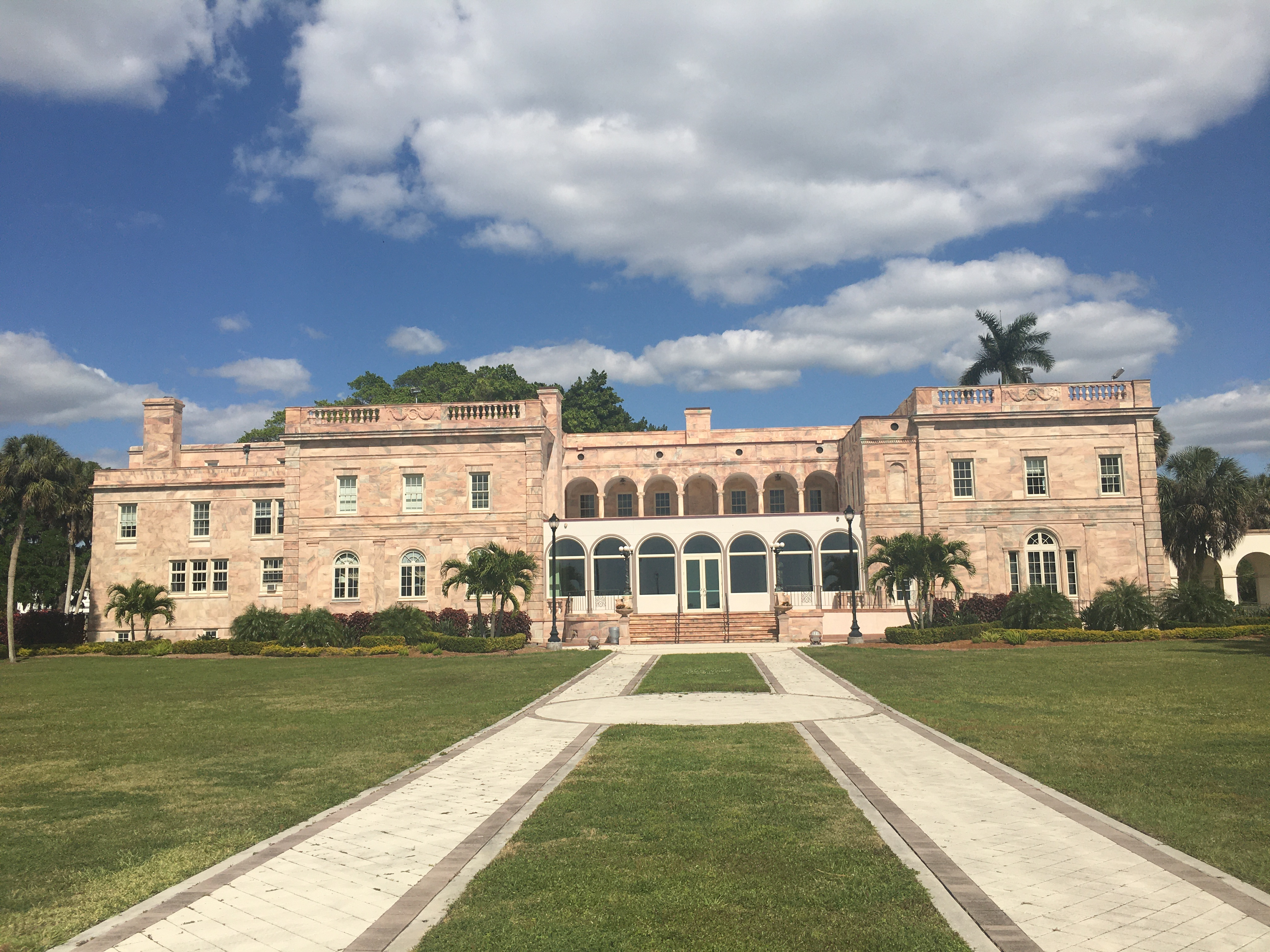
College Hall by Sarasota Bay

The school offered a liberal arts education valuing freedom of inquiry, where individual students were responsible for their own education, implemented through a unique academic program.

By 1972, over 500 students were studying at New College. As the 1970s progressed, inflation threatened to undermine the economic viability of the institution. By 1975, the college was $3.9 million in debt and on the brink of insolvency. At that time, the University of South Florida (USF) expressed interest in buying the land and facilities of the college to establish a branch campus there. The school merged with USF as a separate "upper division campus" within the public university.

In the agreement, the New College board of trustees agreed to hand over the school's campus and other assets to the state, at the time valued at $8.5 million, in exchange for the state paying off its debts and agreeing to continue to operate the school as a separate unit within the USF system. The agreement stated that New College was to receive the same funding, per-student, as other programs at USF. The former New College board of trustees became the New College Foundation, and was required to raise money privately to supplement the state funds to reach the total necessary to run New College, at the time about a third of New College's $2-million-a-year operating budget. Under that agreement, New College was renamed the "New College of the University of South Florida". USF started a Sarasota branch program that shared the bayfront campus, and the schools began an uneasy relationship that would last for the next twenty-five years, with New College and the University of South Florida through its Sarasota branch program sharing the campus.

In 2001 it became an autonomous college, the eleventh independent school of the State University System of Florida as the honors college for the state system. As part of a major reorganization of Florida's public education system in 2001, New College severed its ties with USF, became the eleventh independent school in the State University System of Florida, and adopted its current name, New College of Florida. The Florida legislature officially designated New College as the honors college for the state of Florida. The school's unusual academic system was also encoded in statute: "To provide programs of study that allow students to design their educational experience as much as possible in accordance with their individual interests, values, and abilities." As part of its establishment as an independent university, the University of South Florida was directed to relocate its facilities away from the New College campus, which it did on August 28, 2006, when it opened a new campus for USF Sarasota-Manatee on the undeveloped Seagate portion of the campus. With conditions including that neither institution would build on the undeveloped bayfront property, the Uplands Preserve, that New College owned independently by a donation from the subdivision neighborhood as a natural preserve when the private college was being founded, New College divided the property and allowed USF Sarasota-Manatee to take possession of a portion of the preserve that is north of the city limit and located in Manatee County. New College and USF Sarasota-Manatee continued to share campuses until the new campus was completed and thereafter, certain facilities such as the library remained shared.

For the 2010–2011 academic year, New College had the highest percentage of students receiving a Fulbright scholarship of any college or university in the United States.

=== Appointment of conservative trustees (2023-present) ===
In early 2023, Governor Ron DeSantis overhauled the college's board of trustees, appointing six new members, including Christopher Rufo, Matthew Spalding, Charles R. Kesler, Mark Bauerlein, Debra Jenks, and Eddie Speir. Of those, the first four are well-known conservative activists who live outside of Florida. The DeSantis chief of staff, James Uthmeier, said that "It is our hope that New College of Florida will become Florida's classical college, more along the lines of a Hillsdale of the South." At its first meeting, on January 31, 2023, the new board fired President Patricia Okker ("without cause") and installed Richard Corcoran, a political associate of the governor, as its interim. These actions received national attention and commentary.

Early takeover changes included firing the university president, dissolving the university's diversity and equity office, banning personal pronouns in faculty email signatures, and canceling events promoting diversity and inclusion. Christopher Rufo was reported as having announced: "We will be shutting down low-performing, ideologically-captured academic departments and hiring new faculty" and "The student body will be recomposed over time: some current students will self-select out, others will graduate; we'll recruit new students who are mission-aligned."

According to NPR, "Professors at the New College of Florida are using personal email because they're afraid of being subpoenaed. Students are concerned, too. Some fear for their physical safety. Many worry their teachers will be fired en masse and their courses and books will be policed. It's increasingly hard to focus on their studies."

In April 2023, the board of trustees denied tenure to all five professors who stood for it that year, sparking outcry from the attending audience and leading to the resignation of trustee and faculty chair Matthew Lepinski. When asked to provide reasons for the decision, interim president Richard Corcoran argued for the denial or delay of tenure due to administrative changes and the college's shift towards a more traditional liberal arts focus. Mark Bauerlein argued against granting tenure because the five professors were seeking tenure after meeting all requirements in five years rather than six, claiming that receiving tenure after five years is unusual, and stating that he would apply different criteria if the faculty stand for tenure again after another year. However, the faculty handbook states that the criteria for tenure are identical regardless of year, and around 30% of New College faculty hired in the past decade have received tenure after five years.

The professors—two organic chemists, an Islamic historian, a Latin American/Caribbean historian, and an oceanographer—had already gained approval for their tenure applications from New College faculty, external reviewers, and the previous administration; they were denied in identical 6–4 votes, with the new conservative board members forming the majority. This move was criticized by some as part of a larger trend of conservatives targeting tenure, particularly for professors perceived to hold liberal views. Four of the five professors were awarded tenure the subsequent year, alongside two others applying for tenure for the first time.

Hugo Viera-Vargas, the specialist in Latin American and Caribbean history and the sole professor permanently denied tenure, was identified by President Richard Corcoran as having insufficient class sizes to qualify for tenure. Viera-Vargas was also the sole New College professor who had taken legal action, serving as a plaintiff in a lawsuit against SB266, a comprehensive higher education bill from Governor Ron DeSantis that also eliminated arbitration in university employment disputes.

In May 2023, the college fired librarian Helene Gold, drawing criticism from faculty and students. Gold, the second LGBTQ+ employee terminated in the same year, referred to her firing as a "deliberate and targeted attack on our students who need support now more than ever". Later that month, New College students successfully fundraised over $100,000 for an alternative commencement ceremony. The event was created in protest of the college's conservative takeover and the inclusion of Scott Atlas, a top advisor to former president Donald Trump during the COVID-19 pandemic, as the college's keynote speaker for its end-of-year graduation ceremony. National civil rights activist Maya Wiley delivered the keynote speech at the alternative ceremony, commending students for their advocacy while referencing the Florida Parental Rights in Education Act. Patricia Okker, the former president of New College who was fired after the college's conservative overhaul, gave a brief address. The college's recently dismissed librarian, Helene Gold, spoke at the event and received a standing ovation.

By mid-July 2023, more than a third of the existing faculty had left the college, many choosing to resign or take a leave of absence as a direct result of the conservative takeover. By the fall of 2023, 40% of the professors had left the college, and 1/8 of the students transferred to other schools. Of those who left, some attempted to form an alternative called "Alt New College", which was threatened by a lawsuit by New College of Florida in late 2023. The alternative would end up renaming to AltLiberalArts following the lawsuit.

All of the six trustees appointed by DeSantis were eventually confirmed by the Florida Senate except Eddie Speir, a cofounder of a local Christian academy. Speir blamed the school's new interim president Corcoran for the Senate's rejection in early May.

In October 2023, when appointed interim president Corcoran was formally announced as New College's new president, Corcoran's total annual compensation of more than $1 million drew scrutiny from media and experts in academic and executive compensation, due to disproportionate excessive pay for the president of a public university with a small student body population. Corcoran's base pay was double that of his predecessor, not including several hundred thousand dollars in perks and incentives.

In November 2023, New College requested $400 million in state funding to transform the school, more than $500,000 per student.

The conservative takeover became the focal point for the 2025 documentary First They Came for My College, produced by New College alumni, and was the subject of an episode of Last Week Tonight with John Oliver in 2026.

In the years following the overhaul of New College, the school's ranking on the U.S. News and World Report's Best National Liberal Arts Colleges list dropped from #100 in 2023 to #135 in 2026.

==== 2024 book dumping ====
In August 2024, the Sarasota Herald-Tribune reported the college dumped hundreds of books from its library and now-defunct Gender and Diversity Center. According to the newspaper, students were previously allowed to purchase books from the college's library before they were removed, but were not notified this time. Following the report, the college released a statement claiming the dumping was part of its standard 'weeding' process, and that they were precluded from "selling, donating or transferring these materials", citing Chapter 273 of the Florida Statutes. However, the Sarasota Herald-Tribune pointed out the cited statute explicitly allows New College to dispose of state-funded personal property through sale, donation, or transfer. Amy Reid, a faculty trustee and former director of the college's discontinued gender studies program, alleged that staff were not given any warning regarding the discontinuation of the Gender and Diversity Center. She referred to the subsequent book removals from the center as "an abhorration and a violation of what a university is supposed to be doing". Furthermore, the executive director of local activist group Social Equity Through Education Alliance (SEE) alleged officials at New College refused to work with nonprofits or shelters that were willing to bring trucks and rescue the books. The following week, New College's dean of the library was placed on administrative leave.

In September 2024, the college fired its dean of libraries, Shannon Hausinger. In a termination letter dated August 30, the college claimed Hausinger was responsible for the book dumping and did not collaborate with administrators, nor provide records she claimed to have produced documenting each book and the reason for its disposal. Hausinger's attorney replied that she was not involved in the disposal of books from the Gender and Diversity Center, and was continuing a book disposal project from the previous dean of libraries. Her legal representation also revealed a correspondence between Hausinger and a New College attorney, wherein Hausinger asked for advice on the proper disposal of books within Florida law.

New College president Richard Corcoran issued a statement acknowledging frustration over the book dumping while criticizing media coverage. Christopher Rufo, of New College's board of trustees, reposted pictures of the dumped books on Twitter boasting "We abolished the gender studies program. Now we're taking out the trash". Two spokespeople for Governor Ron DeSantis also posted statements on Twitter applauding the dumping, with press secretary Jeremy Redfern calling it "putting gender studies books in the garbage" and communications director Bryan Griffin referring to the dumped books as propaganda.

Outrage was voiced in the community. The ACLU of Florida criticized the book dumping, referring to it as a "brazen act of censorship" and "direct attack on the voices of LGBTQ+ individuals".

== Governance ==
New College is governed by a 13-member board of trustees. One member is the chair of the faculty senate or equivalent, one is the student body president, six are appointed by the governor, and five are appointed by the board of governors. The appointments are subject to confirmation by the state senate and serve staggered five-year terms. This composition is specified by Section 7(c), Article IX of the state constitution. Previously, there were 12 trustees who serve staggered four-year terms. Of the twelve members, three were residents of Sarasota County and two were from Manatee County.

In December 2023, the American Association of University Professors sanctioned New College of Florida for violating standards of academic governance. In response, a spokesperson for New College of Florida called the sanction a "headline grab" and claimed "the AAUP lacks the authority to sanction New College of Florida, or any college or university for that matter."

In a 2025 Department of Government Efficiency report, it was highlighted that spending at New College was the highest in the state. According to the report the cost to produce an undergraduate degree at New College was $494,715, with the second highest cost to produce an undergraduate degree in Florida being $154,213 at Florida Polytechnic University.

== Presidents ==
1. George F. Baughman (1961–1965)
2. John V. Elmendorf (1965–1972)
3. Arland F. Christ-Janer (1973–1975)
  (no office of New College president while a separate unit within the University of South Florida system)
4. Mike Michalson (2001–2012)
5. Donal O'Shea (2012–2021)
6. Patricia Okker (2021–2023)
7. Bradley Thiessen, interim president (2023)
8. Richard Corcoran (2023–Present)

== Campus ==
New College's 144-acre (0.58 km^{2}) bayfront campus is located in Sarasota, Florida, approximately 50 mi (80 km) south of Tampa. The primary campus is located on the former Edith and Charles Ringling estate, that is included in the first historic district established by the city that extends south to include the Caples campus of the college. The campus also includes the eastern and western portions of a plated subdivision, The Uplands, an incorporated residential neighborhood that is bounded by College Drive to the south and the Seagate property to the north, Sarasota Bay to the west, and Tamiami Trail to the east. Half of the bayfront of the primary college campus is in The Uplands plat and during the original founding of New College The Uplands donated its bay front to New College to be kept as a natural preserve. The campus's most remarkable structures are its three Florida 1920s boom time, grand-scale residences: College Hall was the home of Edith and Charles Ringling; Cook Hall was the home of Hester Ringling Lancaster Sanford; and the third, Caples Hall that was the home of Ellen and Ralph Caples. The well-appointed structures date from the early to mid-1920s, are listed on the National Register of Historic Places, and are similar in style to the adjacent John and Mable Ringling Museum of Art and their residence, Cà d'Zan. The homes are major aspects of the Caples'-Ringlings' Estates Historic District.

The campus is also home to several examples of high modernist architecture designed by I. M. Pei. These buildings include a complex of student residences known as "Pei", a cafeteria, and a student center. The other dormitories are Dort, Goldstein, and Palmer B. Five new dormitory buildings were opened in the 2007–2008 school year.

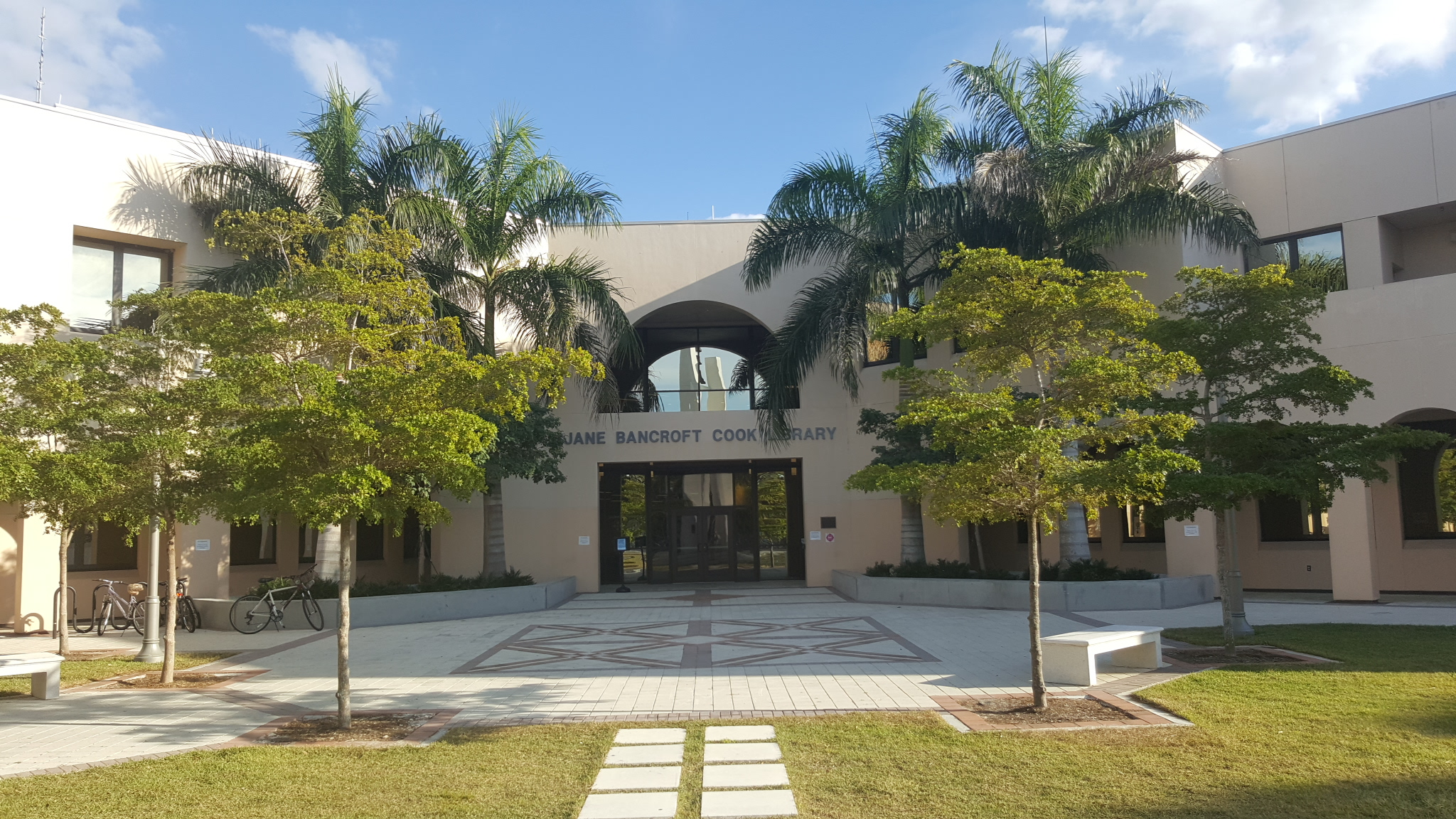
The Jane Bancroft Cook Library, taken from under the bell tower

The Jane Bancroft Cook Library is for both New College students and the University of South Florida's Sarasota-Manatee campus. It is also a resource for Manatee Community College. The local library collection has several hundred thousand items and access to more than eleven million items through the State University Libraries system.

The Pritzker Marine Biology Research Center opened in 2001. The facility supports the biology, marine biology, and environmental sciences programs, three of the most popular fields of study at New College.

In 2005, a long range campus master plan was developed through public workshops held by several design teams with participation by students, faculty, administration, residents of the community, and staff members of local governmental agencies.

In 2011, the college opened a new Academic Center and the adjacent Robert and Beverly Koski Academic Plaza. The most recent addition to the campus, in 2017, is a 22,000-square-foot addition to the Heiser Natural Sciences Center.

In September 2025, following the assassination of Charlie Kirk, the college announced that it is planning to build a statue in his honor on campus. It said it would fund the statue's construction with private donations.

== Academics ==
Academic rankings

Liberal arts
- U.S. News & World Report: 122 out of 211
- Washington Monthly: 23 out of 194

=== Recognition ===
Eighty-six New College students have been awarded Fulbright scholarships since the founding of the college. For 2010–11, New College was found to have the highest percentage of students receiving Fulbright scholarships than any other university or college in the United States. For 2024, U.S. News and World Report ranked New College tied for 122nd out of 211 ranked "National Liberal Arts Colleges", tied for 7th in Top Public Schools, and tied for 54th in "Social Mobility".

In 2024, Washington Monthly ranked New College 23rd among 194 liberal arts colleges in the U.S. based on its contribution to the public good, as measured by social mobility, research, and promoting public service.

=== Undergraduate admissions ===
In 2024, New College of Florida accepted 75.4% of undergraduate applicants with those admitted having an average 3.87 GPA and standardized test scores of an average 1230 SAT score, with a 75th percentile score of 1360, or an average 27 ACT score, with a 75th percentile score of 31.

=== Undergraduate programs ===
As an honors college, the college is distinguished by its unusual "contract system", in which students are given written evaluations instead of grades and agree to semester-long contracts in which a certain number of classes must be passed. For example, in a "three out of five" contract, a student who failed two classes would face no penalty, although one who failed three classes would risk losing all credits for the entire semester. The system was devised to encourage academic experimentation, self-directed learning, and foster curiosity about disparate topics outside one's usual course of study; it grew out of the school's founding principle, as laid out in 1964 by Dean and Provost John W. Gustad: "In the last analysis, every student is responsible for his or her own education." New College students are required to complete an undergraduate thesis project and baccalaureate exam, during which the student presents and defends their project to a committee of professors.

=== Graduate programs ===
As of 2022, New College offers a master's degree in Applied Data Science. The MS in Applied Data Science is an adaptation of the original MS in Data Science, featuring a greater focus of application to industry. The MS in Data Science was created in 2015, and began with a founding cohort of seven students. As of 2022, there were 27 students enrolled in the Applied Data Science graduate program. The MS in Applied Data Science is a two-year program, featuring a 100% employment rate upon graduation. Students of the MS in Applied Data Science program are required to complete a paid practicum during the final semester of their degree. New College undergraduates pursuing any major may apply for the 3+2 path, putting them on track to be awarded a bachelor's degree and an MS in Applied Data Science in five years. The New College MS in Applied Data Science was ranked #25 on Fortune's "Best Master's in Data Science Programs in 2022".

=== Cost of attendance ===
For the 2021–22 school year, tuition and fees for in-state residents amounted to $6,916. Tuition and fees for both out-of-state residents and international students totaled $29,944, or $832 per credit hour. New College charges both in-state and out-of-state residents $10,892 for room and board each academic year. For international students, the cost of room and board at New College is $12,992. These costs have been stable for several years through 2022. For master's degree students, the cost of first-year tuition and fees is $11,383.92 for in-state residents, and $28,067.28 for out-of-state and international students. On average, New College students take on the least debt compared to undergraduates from any other school in the state university System. Only 33% of New College students took on any loans with an average loan of about $5500. At comparable institutions, 53% of students took on loans with an average loan of approximately $6,300. New College offers scholarships to the majority of admitted students.

=== Cross College Alliance ===
The Cross College Alliance is composed of five institutions: New College of Florida, Ringling College of Art and Design, The Ringling, State College of Florida, Manatee–Sarasota, and University of South Florida Sarasota–Manatee. The alliance aims to foster community among these local organizations through shared resources. Students at New College of Florida may cross-register at any of the three other colleges in the alliance.

== Student life ==
Undergraduate demographics as of Fall 2023
Race and ethnicity	Total
White	57%
Hispanic	23%
Black	6%
Two or more races	5%
Asian	4%
International student	4%
Unknown	1%
Economic diversity
Low-income (Note: The percentage of students who received an income-based federal Pell grant intended for low-income students.)	30%
Affluent (Note: The percentage of students who are a part of the American middle class at the bare minimum.)	70%

=== New College Student Alliance ===
The New College Student Alliance (NCSA) is New College's student government organization. "Towne Meetings," held monthly, are the main forum for public debate and are open to all students, faculty, and staff.

=== Athletics ===
New College of Florida offered only intercollegiate archery, esports, powerlifting, rowing, sailing, and swimming through 2022. The club sailing team is a member of the South Atlantic Intercollegiate Sailing Association (SAISA). The New Crew SRQ rowing club was launched in 2021 and trains at Nathan Benderson Park. The New College powerlifting team competes in regional and state competitions against other Florida colleges and universities.

Since 2023, New College's athletics teams are nicknamed the Mighty Banyans. In parallel with the university's 2023 overhaul, New College joined the National Association of Intercollegiate Athletics (NAIA) as a member of the Sun Conference. The school announced plans to offer 17 new sports and increase its number of student-athletes from 140 in 2023 to 350 by Fall 2027. In March 2023, Mariano Jimenez was announced as new athletic director and baseball coach.

== Alumni ==
Noteable alumni (Note: As of 2022, there have only been 6,709 New College graduates. However, every student who has completed one semester-long contract is considered a New College alumnus, and unlike most colleges, New College refers to alumni by the year they entered, not by graduation year.) from the New College of Florida include:

- Mark Weiser, did not graduate, computer scientist
- William Dudley, former president of the Federal Reserve Bank of New York;
- Nancy McEldowney, National Security Advisor to Vice President Harris and former US Ambassador to Bulgaria;
- Anita L. Allen, University of Pennsylvania law professor and vice provost;
- William Thurston, mathematician and Fields Medal recipient
- Margee Ensign, current president of Dickinson College and former president of American University of Nigeria
- Jennifer Granick, former civil liberties director at the Stanford Center for Internet and Society
- José Díaz-Balart, national MSNBC, NBC and Telemundo anchor
- Rick Doblin, founder of the Multidisciplinary Association for Psychedelic Studies
- Carol Flint, Emmy Award-winning television writer/producer
- Lincoln Díaz-Balart, former U.S. representative
- David M. Smolin, professor of law and director for Cumberland School of Law's Center for Biotechnology, Law, and Ethics
- Jackie Wang, finalist for the 2021 National Book Award for Poetry
- Malcolm Brenner, author

In July 2026, the New College Foundation voted to dissolve the New College Alumni Association, which had previously existed for nearly fifty years. The action was criticized by alumni of New College and members of the school's community, who felt that the association's dissolution was intended to "eliminate an independent alumni voice and further divide the college".
