= 2000 Pacific hurricane season =

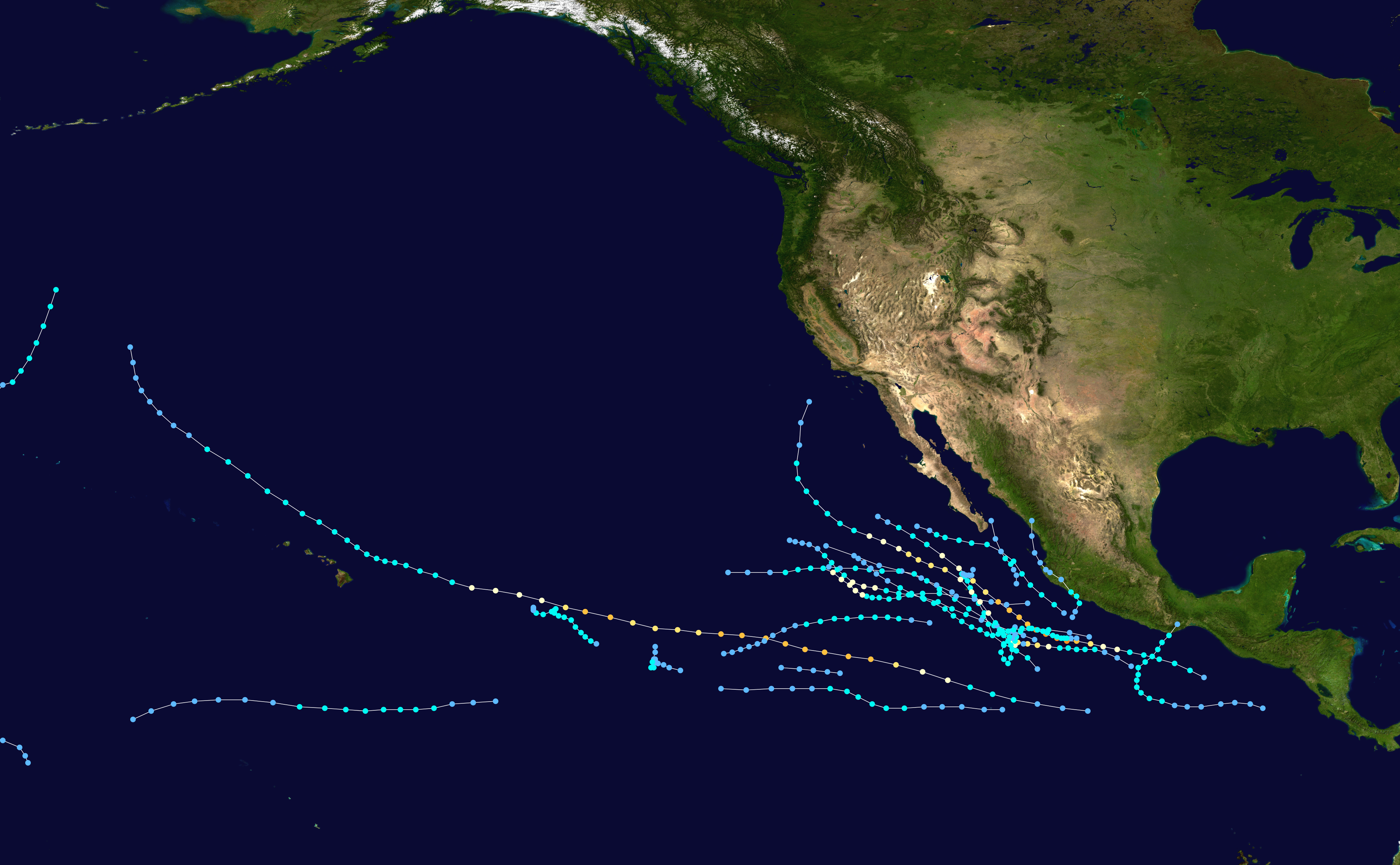
- Season summary map

Seasonal boundaries
- First system formed: May 22, 2000
- Last system dissipated: November 8, 2000

Strongest storm
- Name: Carlotta
  - Maximum winds: 155 mph (250 km/h) (1-minute sustained)
  - Lowest pressure: 932 mbar (hPa; 27.52 inHg)

Seasonal statistics
- Total depressions: 21
- Total storms: 19
- Hurricanes: 6
- Major hurricanes (Cat. 3+): 2
- Total fatalities: 27 total
- Total damage: $84.3 million (2000 USD)

Related articles
- Timeline of the 2000 Pacific hurricane season; 2000 Atlantic hurricane season; 2000 Pacific typhoon season; 2000 North Indian Ocean cyclone season

The 2000 Pacific hurricane season was an above-average Pacific hurricane season, although most of the storms were weak and short-lived. There were a total of 19 named storms, including 17 named by the National Hurricane Center (NHC) and two by the Central Pacific Hurricane Center (CPHC). There were six hurricanes, which was slightly below-average. Two of the hurricanes became major hurricanes, which is a Category 3 or greater on the Saffir–Simpson scale.

Seasonal activity began on May 22, when Hurricane Aletta formed off the southwest coast of Mexico. Aletta's formation was earlier than average, and it began a nine-year period of consecutive seasons with May storms. Aletta was also the first May Pacific hurricane since 1990. Two storms formed in June, including the season's strongest, Carlotta, which peaked as a strong Category 4 hurricane. The hurricane killed 18 people when it sank the Lithuanian freighter Linkuva. In July, three named storms developed, including Hurricane Daniel, which was the second-strongest storm of the season. Daniel briefly threatened the U.S. state of Hawaii while weakening. Also in the month, Tropical Storm Upana developed in the central Pacific, the first storm to do so since 1997.

August was the most active month of the year, with six storms forming. These included hurricanes Gilma and Hector, which remained off the southwest coast of Mexico, as well as Tropical Storm Wene, which crossed from the west Pacific into the central Pacific. In September, Hurricane Lane executed a rare loop off the southwest coast of Mexico, before its remnants produced thunderstorms across California. Also in the month, tropical storms Miriam and Norman made landfall in western Mexico. Miriam hit Baja California Sur, producing damaging rains. Norman hit the Mexican states of Michoacán and Jalisco, producing floods that killed nine people. In October, the remnants of Tropical Storm Olivia brought rainfall to the southwest United States. In November, the remnants of Tropical Storm Paul interacted with an upper-level trough to produce heavy rainfall over the Hawaiian islands, leading to flash floods and landslides. Damage on the island of Hawaiʻi totaled $88.2 million. (Note: Damage totals are listed in United States dollars unless otherwise stated and are unadjusted for inflation.) Also in the month, Tropical Storm Rosa struck southeastern Mexico and dissipated on November 8, ending the season.

== Seasonal summary ==
For the north Pacific Ocean, east of 140° W, the National Hurricane Center (NHC) named 17 tropical storms; this was above the then 34–year average of 15.4 named storms. Six of the storms attained hurricane status, slightly below the average of 8.6 hurricanes. Two tropical depressions developed but did not reach storm strength. There were also four storms within the warning area of the Central Pacific Hurricane Center (CPHC) between 140° W and the International Date Line, which was near average. This included two storms that formed within the central Pacific and were given Hawaiian names by the CPHC. The season was affected by a weak La Niña conditions, in which equatorial water temperatures were slightly cooler than usual. The season began earlier than average with the formation of Hurricane Aletta in late May. The average Pacific hurricane season has its first tropical storm formation on June 10, with the first hurricane 16 days later. May storms typically occur every other year, with May hurricanes every three to four years. However, the 2000 season began a nine-year consecutive period of storm formation during the month. By September, activity was below average, with three named storms and the season's final hurricane, Lane. The accumulated cyclone energy (ACE) index for the 2000 Pacific hurricane season, as calculated by Colorado State University using data from the NHC, was 96 units. (Note: The total represents the sum of the squares of the maximum sustained wind speed (knots) for every tropical storm's intensity of over 38 mph (61 km/h), divided by 10,000 while they are above that threshold; therefore, tropical depressions are not included.)

== Systems ==
=== Hurricane Aletta ===
- Category 2 hurricane (SSHWS)
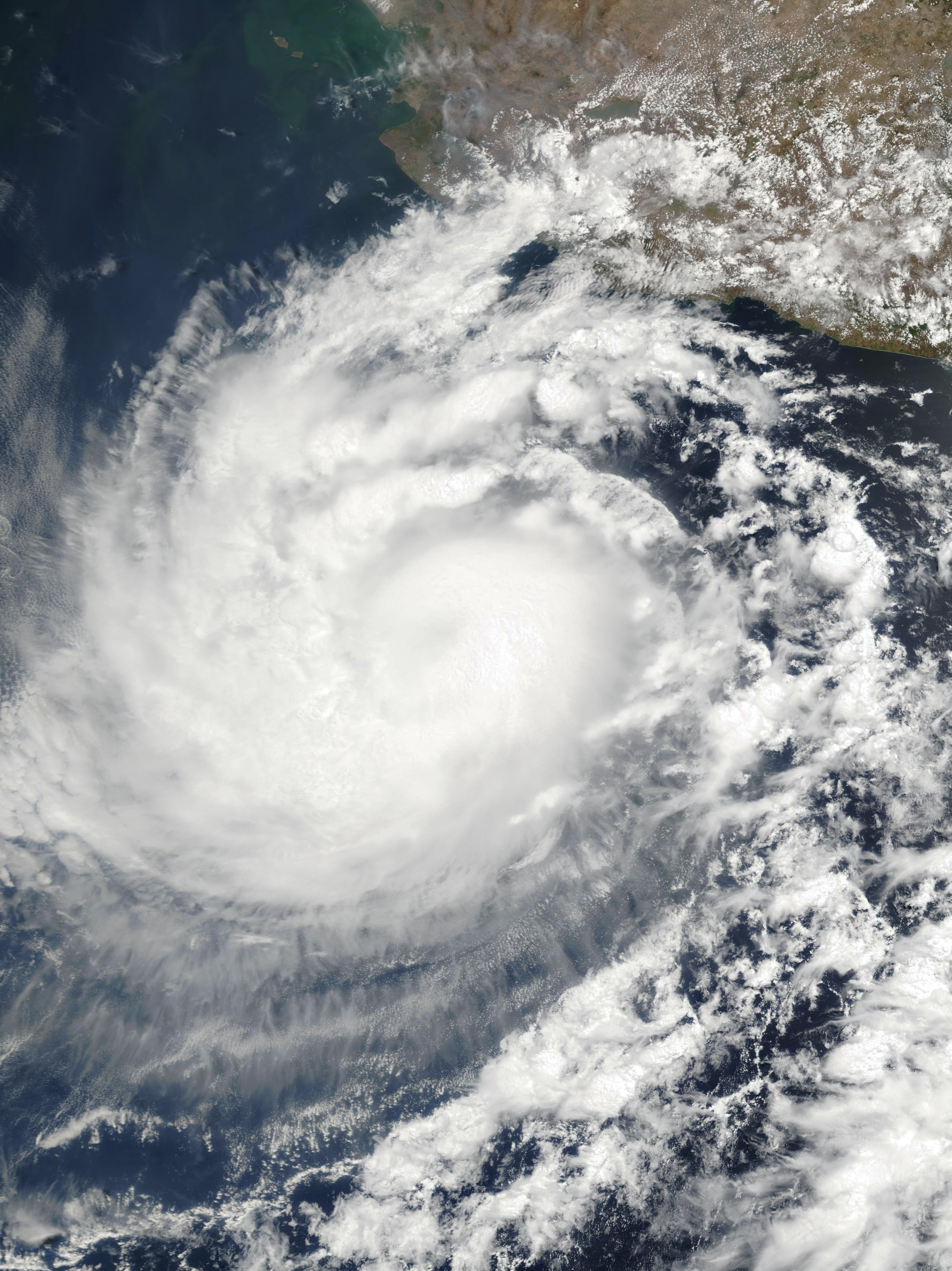
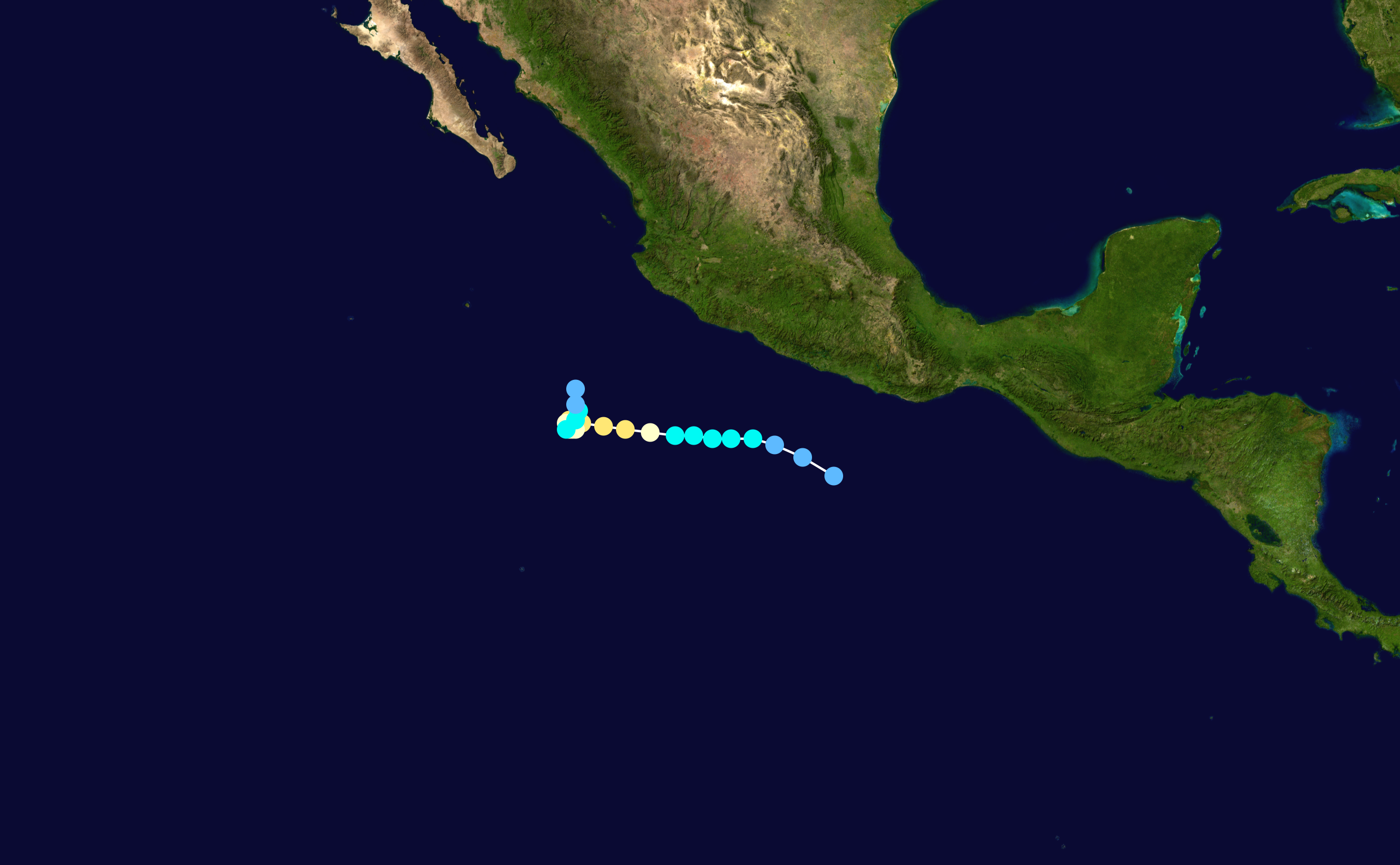
- Duration: May 22 – May 28
- Peak intensity: 105 mph (165 km/h) (1-min); 970 mbar (hPa)

A tropical wave crossed Central America and entered the Gulf of Tehuantepec on May 20. Deep convection developed near the center of the disturbance. On May 22, the system became the first tropical depression of the season while located about 240 mi (390 km) south of Acapulco, Mexico. A mid-level ridge forced a west-northwest track away from the Mexican coast. It intensified into Tropical Storm Aletta early on May 23 while located 220 miles (350 km) south of Zihuatanejo, Mexico, becoming the first May tropical storm in four years. As it turned westward, it continued a slow intensification trend, before strengthening more quickly due to decreased wind shear. On May 24, Aletta attained hurricane status, and shortly thereafter reached peak winds of 105 mph (165 km/h); this made it a Category 2 on the Saffir–Simpson scale. Aletta was the first May Pacific hurricane since Alma in 1990. After maintaining peak winds for about 18 hours, Aletta began a weakening trend due to increasing wind shear. At around the same time, a trough eroded the ridge that was steering the movement of Aletta, causing the hurricane to remain almost stationary for the next two days. The lack of motion resulted in upwelling which imparted additional weakening, and Aletta dropped to tropical storm status on May 27. It quickly deteriorated that day, and on May 28 the system dissipated well south of Cabo San Lucas after it began a slow north drift. The remnants lingered in the same area for the next several days.

=== Tropical Storm Bud ===
- Tropical storm (SSHWS)
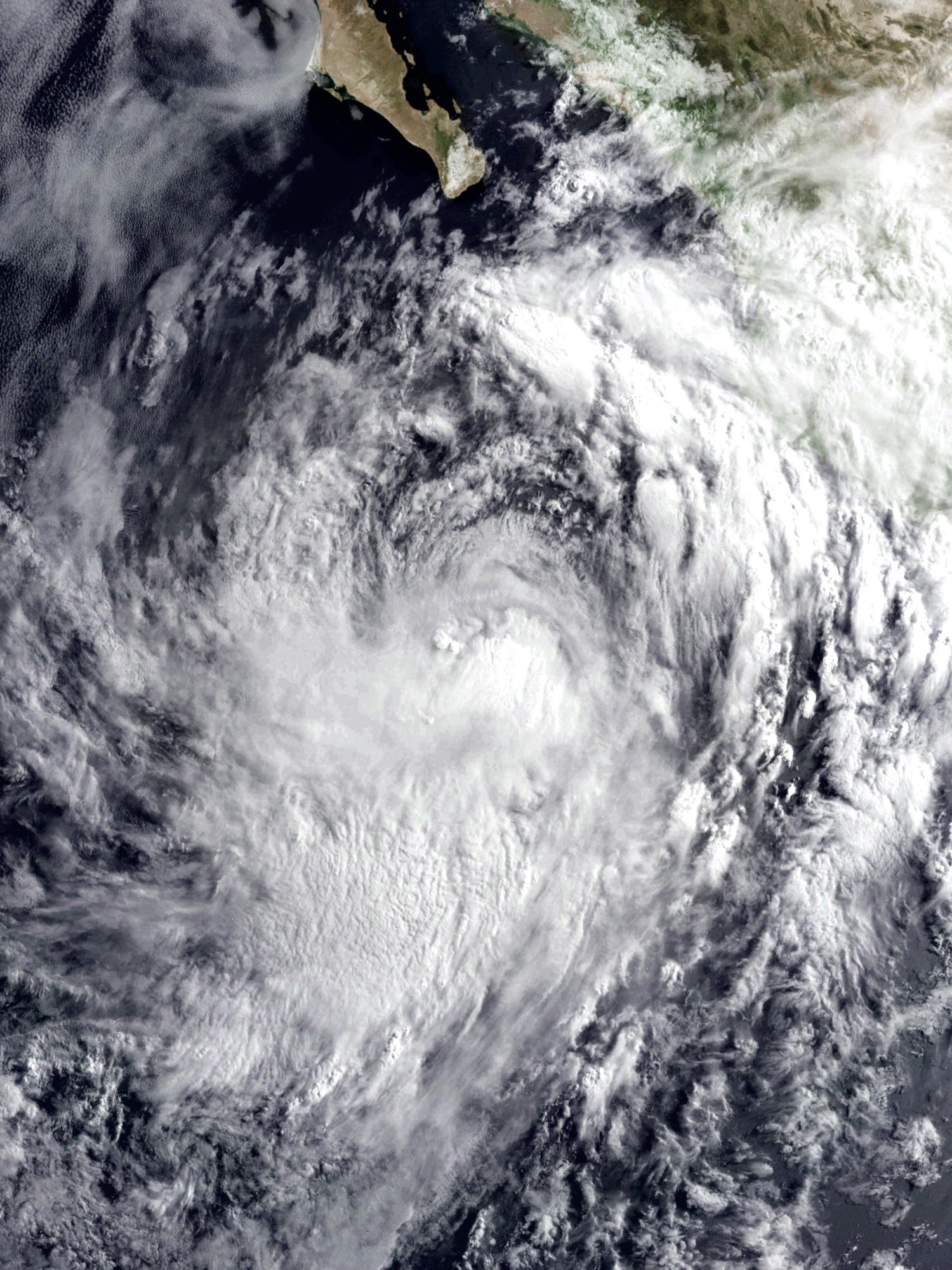
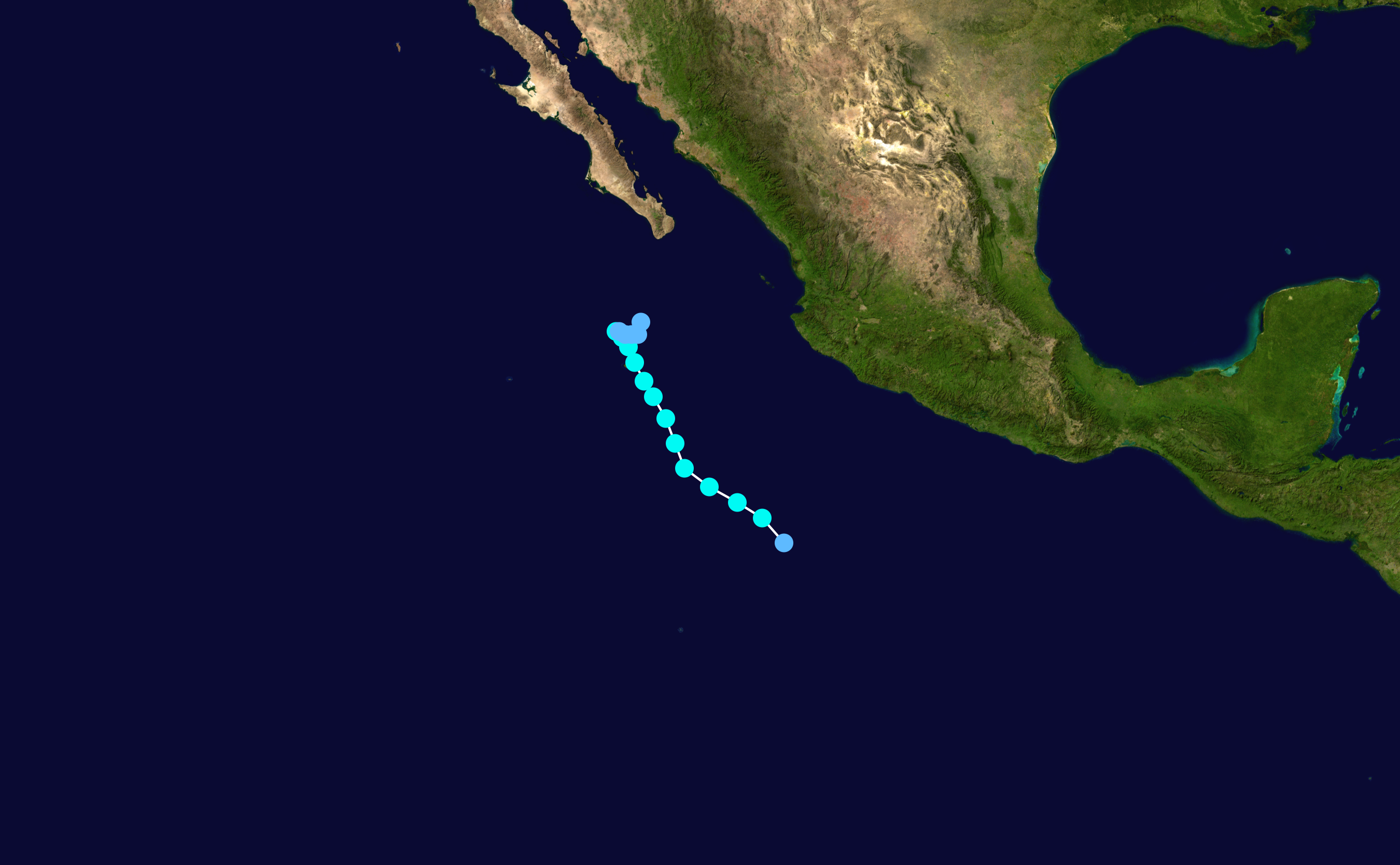
- Duration: June 13 – June 17
- Peak intensity: 50 mph (85 km/h) (1-min); 994 mbar (hPa)

A tropical wave moved off the coast of Africa on May 22, crossing the Atlantic without development. It entered the eastern Pacific Ocean on June 6 and remained disorganized until June 11, when a broad low-pressure area developed southwest of Acapulco, Mexico. The wave was only intensifying slowly, and on June 13, it became strong enough to be designated as a tropical depression. It quickly strengthened to Tropical Storm Bud six hours later, and moved to the northwest. The storm reached a peak intensity of 50 mph (85 km/h) early on June 14. Bud turned to the north-northwest, and slowly weakened from June 15 onwards, due to increasing vertical wind shear and cooler ocean water temperatures. The storm's forward speed decreased and began to meander, as the ridge to the north of Bud weakened and a trough developed over the western United States. It drifted erratically while located just north of Socorro Island, and was downgraded to a tropical depression on June 16. By the next day, the depression degenerated into an area of low pressure, which persisted until June 19.

=== Hurricane Carlotta ===
- Category 4 hurricane (SSHWS)
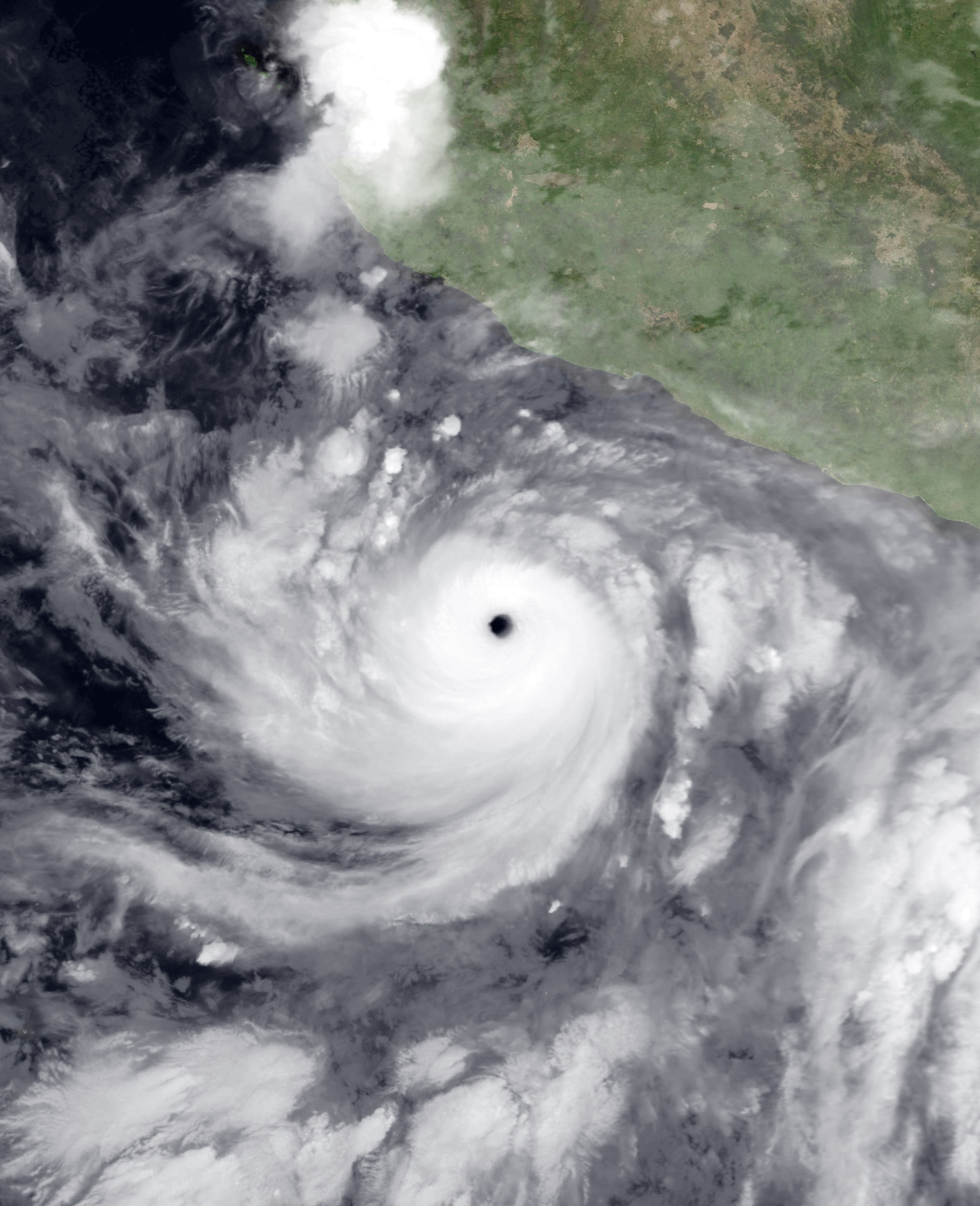
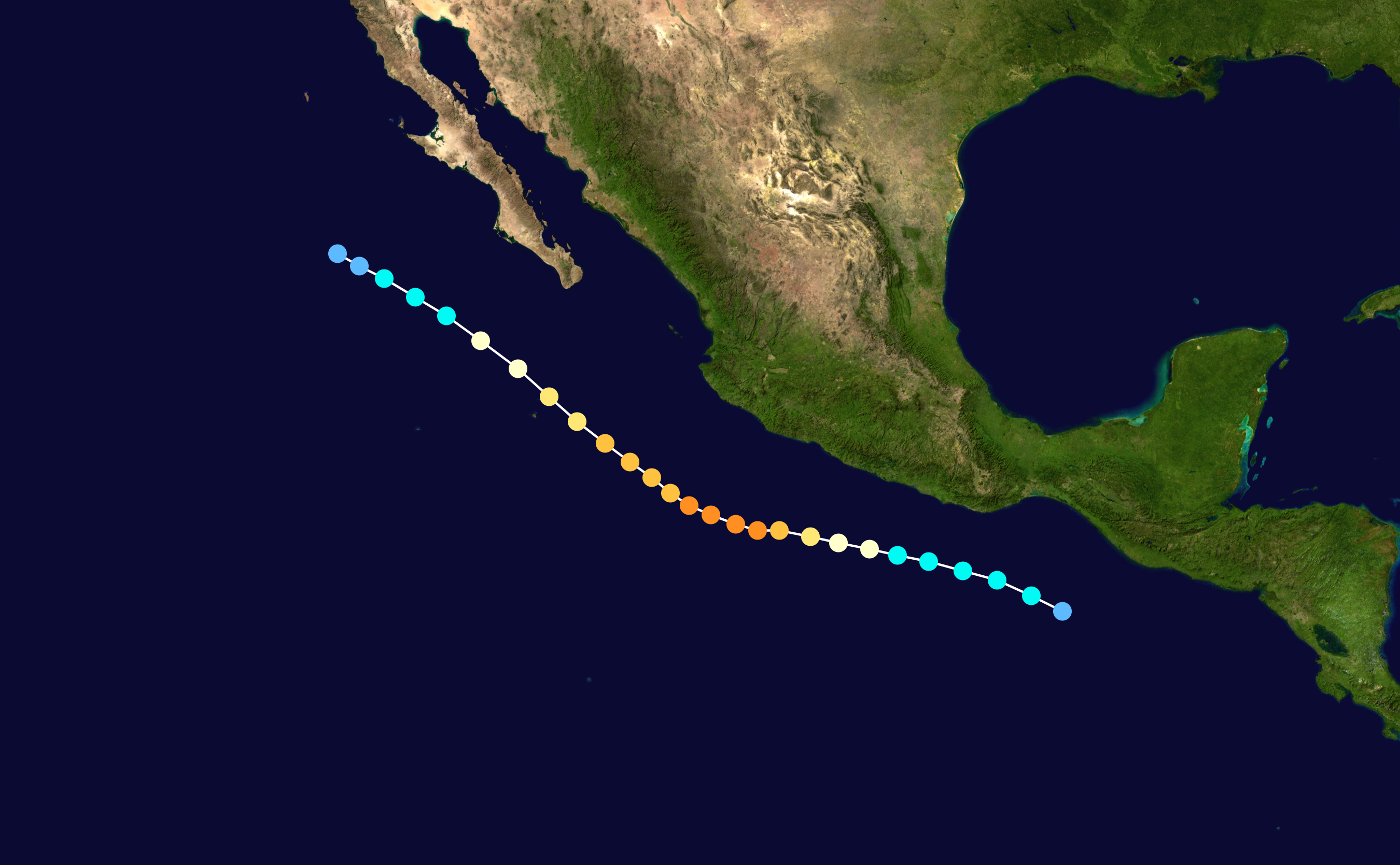
- Duration: June 18 – June 25
- Peak intensity: 155 mph (250 km/h) (1-min); 932 mbar (hPa)

A tropical wave exited Africa on June 3 and crossed into the eastern Pacific 12 days later. Continuing westward, it developed thunderstorms and a low pressure area. On June 18, Tropical Depression Three-E formed about 270 miles (430 km) southeast of Puerto Angel, Oaxaca. Moving parallel to the southern Mexican coast, the depression quickly strengthened into Tropical Storm Carlotta. It approached within 140 miles (230 km) of the coast on June 19. An eye developed in the center of the deep convection, with strong outflow to the south. Carlotta attained hurricane status on June 20, and subsequently a period of rapid deepening as it moved farther offshore. With warm waters and a very favorable upper-level environment, Carlotta quickly strengthened into a major hurricane. In a twelve-hour period ending at 06:00 UTC on June 21, the pressure dropped 49 mbar to 932 mbar (27.5 inHg); at the same time, Carlotta attained peak winds of 155 mph (250 km/h) while located about 285 mi (460 km) southwest of Acapulco. This made it a strong Category 4 hurricane. At the time of its peak intensity, Carlotta maintained a well-defined central dense overcast around an eye of 20 miles (32 km) in diameter. It maintained peak winds for about 12 hours before weakening due to stronger wind shear and cooler waters. Early on June 24, Carlotta weakened to a tropical storm about 260 miles (420 km) west-southwest of Cabo San Lucas. On the next day, the winds dropped to tropical depression status, as deep convection diminished. Carlotta degenerated into a remnant low, which persisted for several days while continuing to the northwest.

Offshore Mexico, waves reached 40 feet (12 m) in height. The Lithuanian freighter Linkuva suffered an engine failure about 220 mi (350 km) southwest of Acapulco, while encountering Carlotta's waves and strong winds. The freighter was lost, killing the crew of 18 people. A naval vessel from both the United States Navy and the Mexican Navy searched for the freighter for three days. Outer rainbands and rough surf affected the southwestern coast of Mexico for an extended duration; officials evacuated about 100 families in potentially flooded areas of Acapulco as a precaution. Precipitation and clouds were reported in every Mexican state along the Pacific Ocean, causing flooding. Bahías de Huatulco International Airport in Oaxaca reported a wind gust of 44 mph (71 km/h). Heavy rainfall and rough seas were also reported on Socorro Island.

=== Tropical Depression Four-E ===
- Tropical depression (SSHWS)
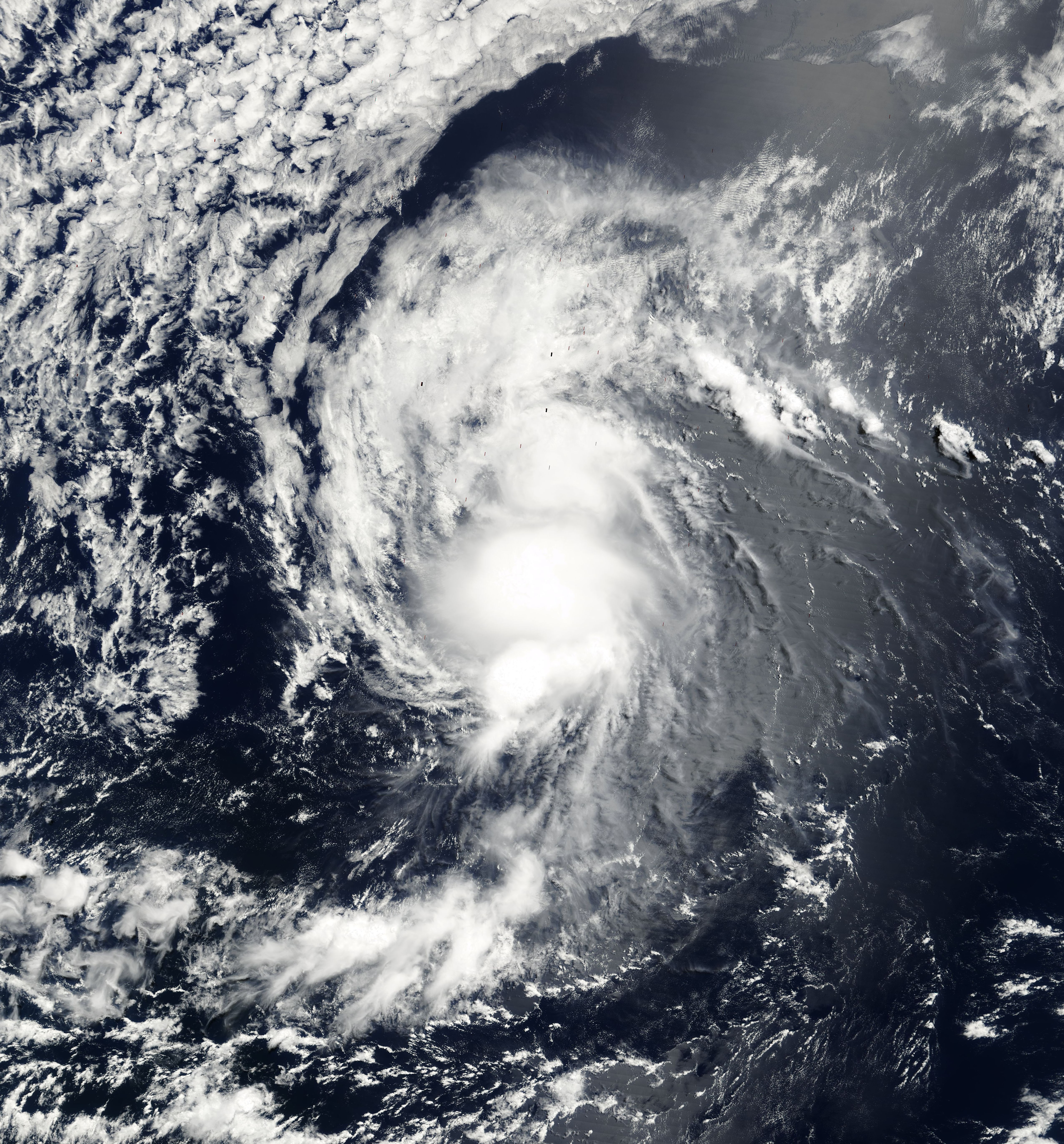
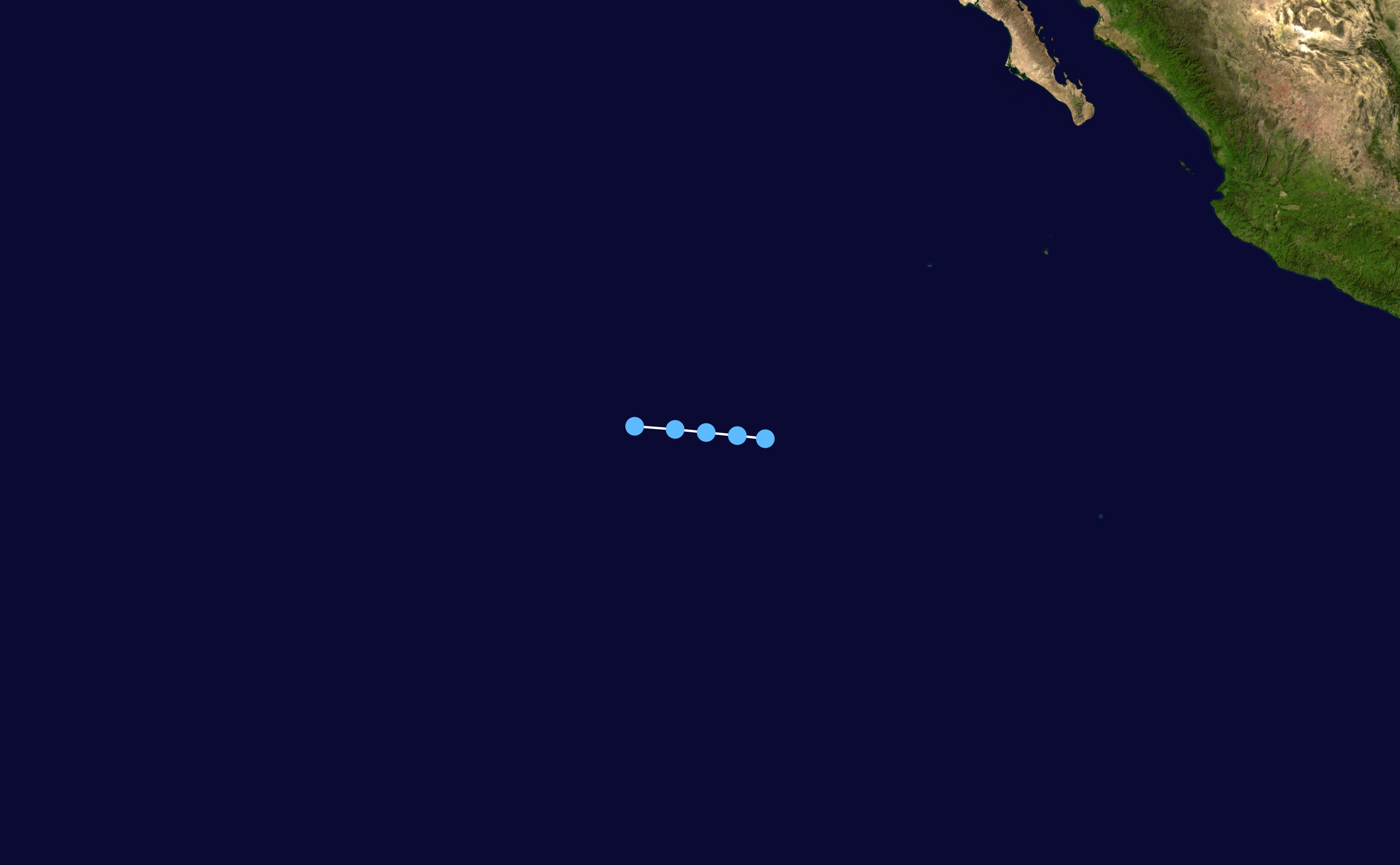
- Duration: July 6 – July 7
- Peak intensity: 30 mph (45 km/h) (1-min); 1007 mbar (hPa)

The same tropical wave that spawned Tropical Depression Two in the Atlantic later entered the eastern Pacific by July 1. Several days later, the thunderstorms increased and became more concentrated. On July 6, it developed into Tropical Depression Four-E about 1,380 mi (2,220 km) southwest of the southern tip of the Baja California peninsula. The depression was soon affected by dry air and wind shear, causing the thunderstorms to diminish. The depression began dissipating on July 7.

=== Tropical Storm Upana ===
- Tropical storm (SSHWS)
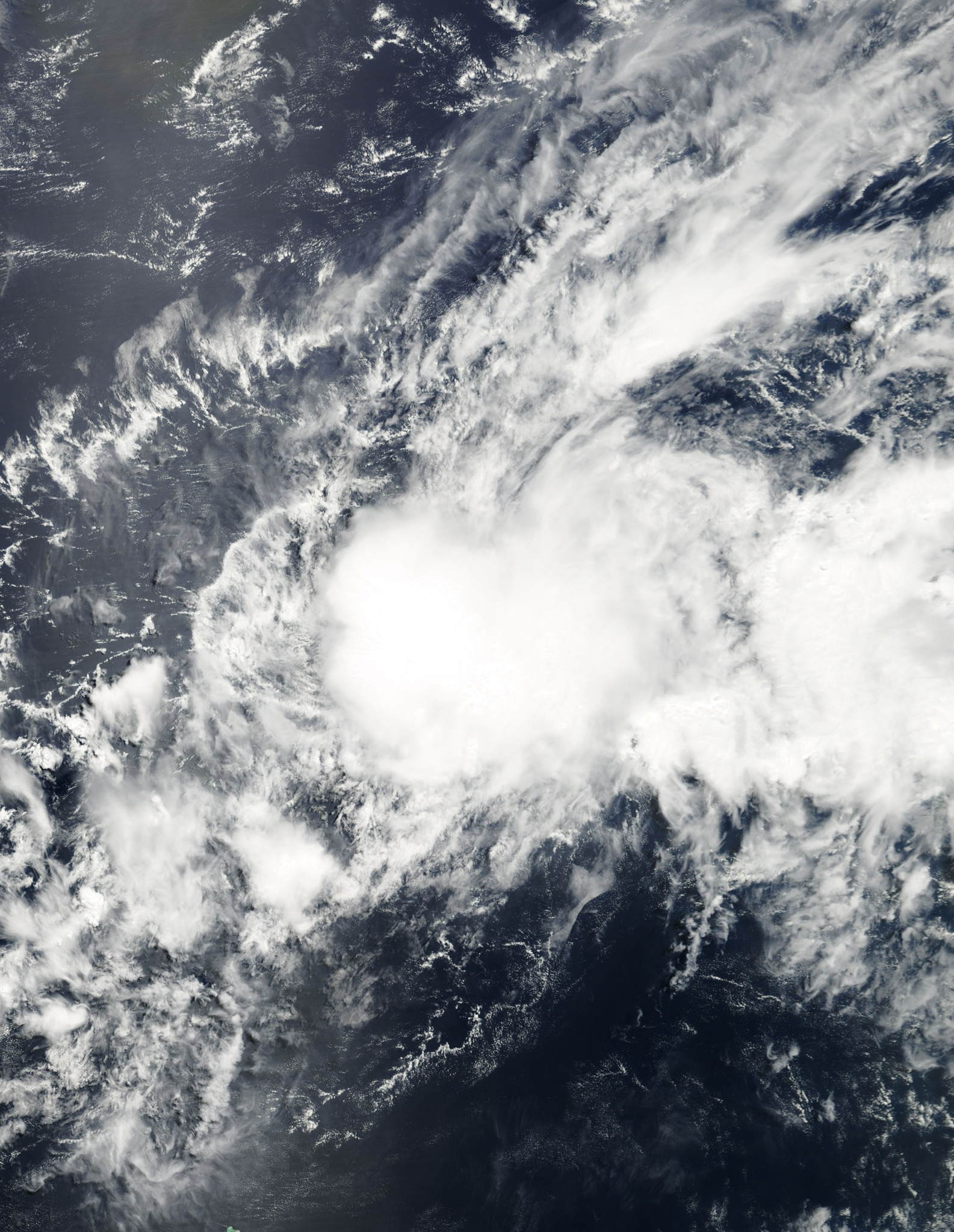
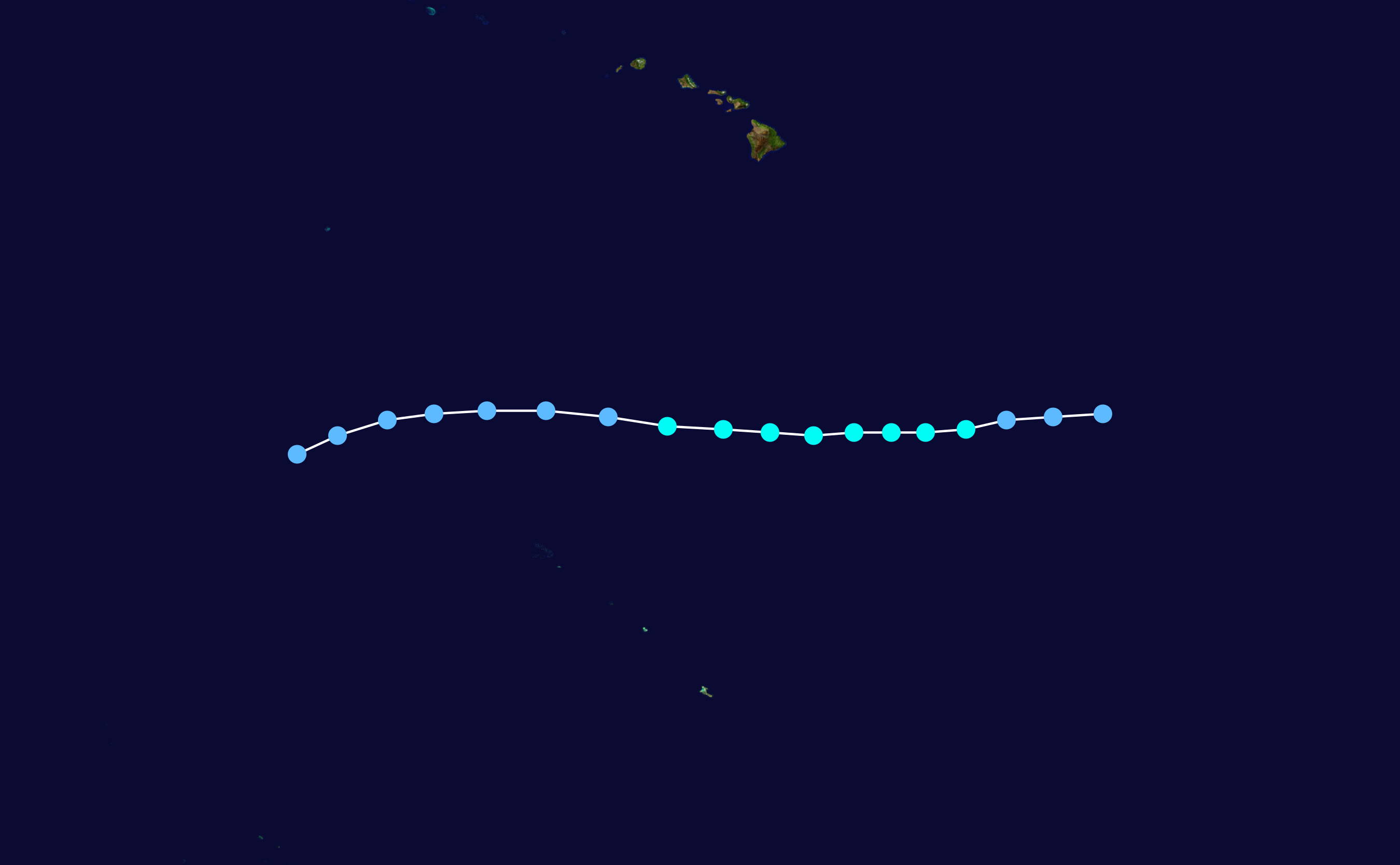
- Duration: July 20 – July 24
- Peak intensity: 45 mph (75 km/h) (1-min); 999 mbar (hPa)

A tropical wave organized into Tropical Depression One-C on July 20 while located southeast of the Hawaiian Islands. It moved nearly due west, strengthening into Tropical Storm Upana later on July 20; the name is Hawaiian for "Urban". It was the first tropical storm to develop in the Central Pacific region since 1997 season. Despite a favorable environment, Upana strengthened little, reaching a peak intensity on July 21 with winds of 50 mph (80 km/h). The storm had no deep convection in its circulation on July 22, and was downgraded to a tropical depression in the afternoon. Late on July 23, deep convection flared up, briefly strengthening the system again, but failed to re-gain tropical storm status, as it remained poorly organized. It dissipated on July 24, despite a low-shear environment favorable for development. On July 26, a westward moving disturbance in the central Pacific basin containing remnants of Tropical Storm Upana began showing signs of organization as it neared the International Date Line. The next day, a tropical depression, designated 12W by the Joint Typhoon Warning Center (JTWC), formed about 575 mi (925 km) east of Kwajalein Atoll. The system moved generally northwestward over the next day, and gradually became better organized. At 18:00 UTC on July 28, JTWC upgraded the depression to a tropical storm and named it Chanchu. Chanchu then tracked north, before dissipating on July 30.

=== Tropical Depression Five-E ===
- Tropical depression (SSHWS)
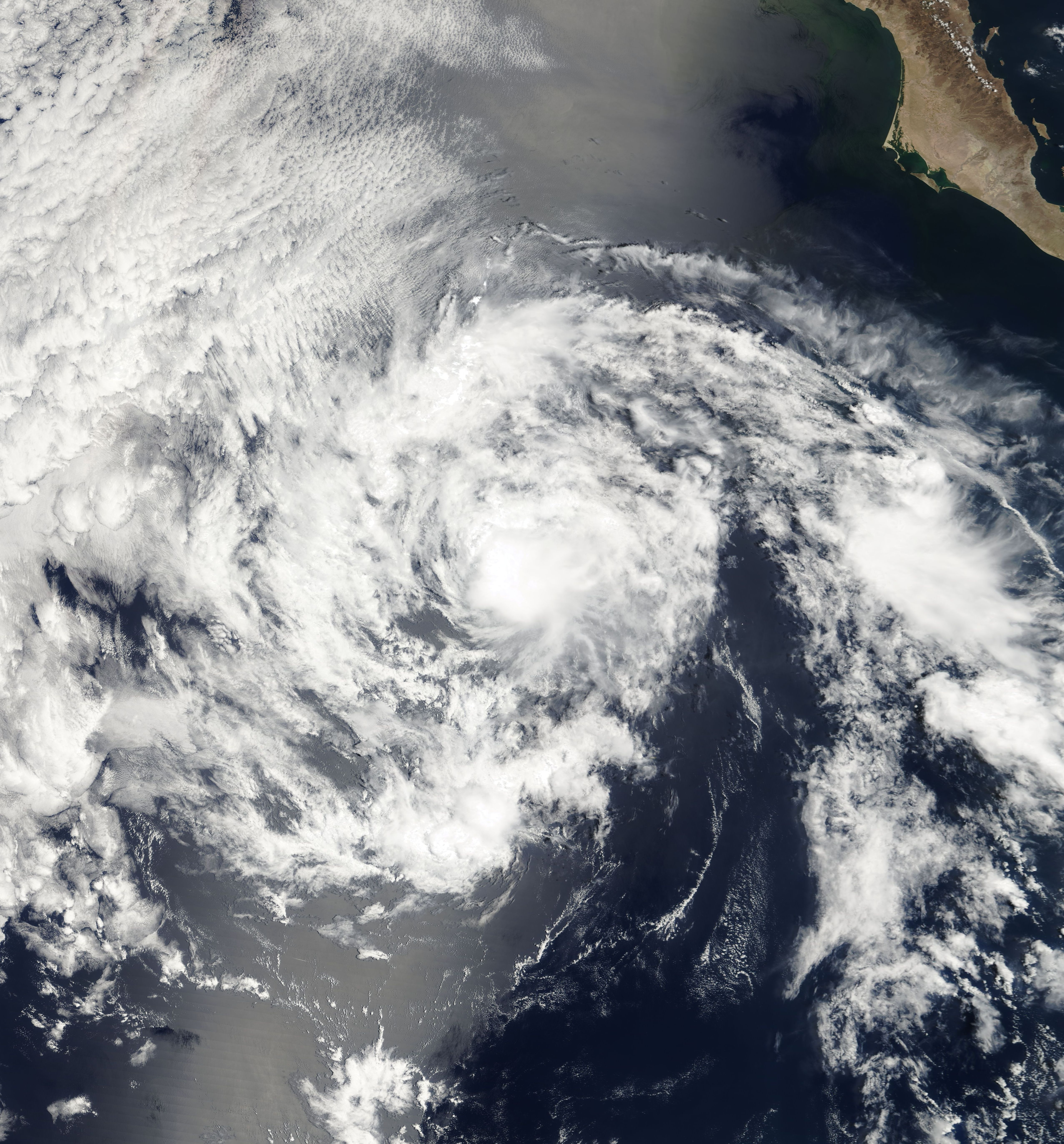
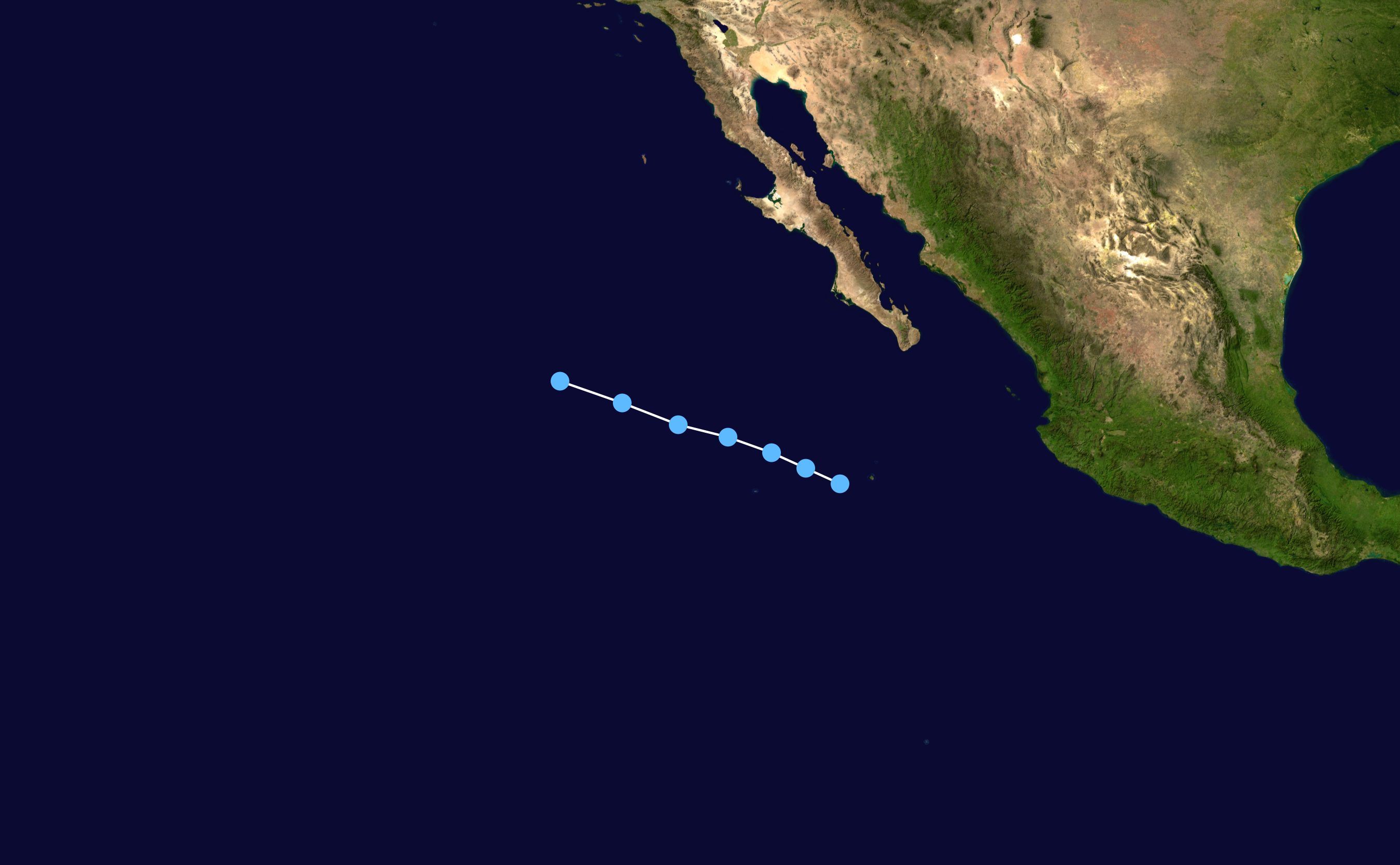
- Duration: July 22 – July 23
- Peak intensity: 35 mph (55 km/h) (1-min); 1005 mbar (hPa)

The origins of Tropical Depression Five-E were first identified on July 8 when a tropical wave moved off the west African coast. It entered the eastern Pacific Ocean on July 16 after tracking over the Caribbean Sea. The wave developed to Tropical Depression Five-E on July 22 off the southwest coast of Mexico. Lacking significant deep convection and moving over cold waters, the depression failed to intensify. The NHC discontinued advisories on July 23, just a day after the depression formed.

=== Hurricane Daniel ===
- Category 3 hurricane (SSHWS)
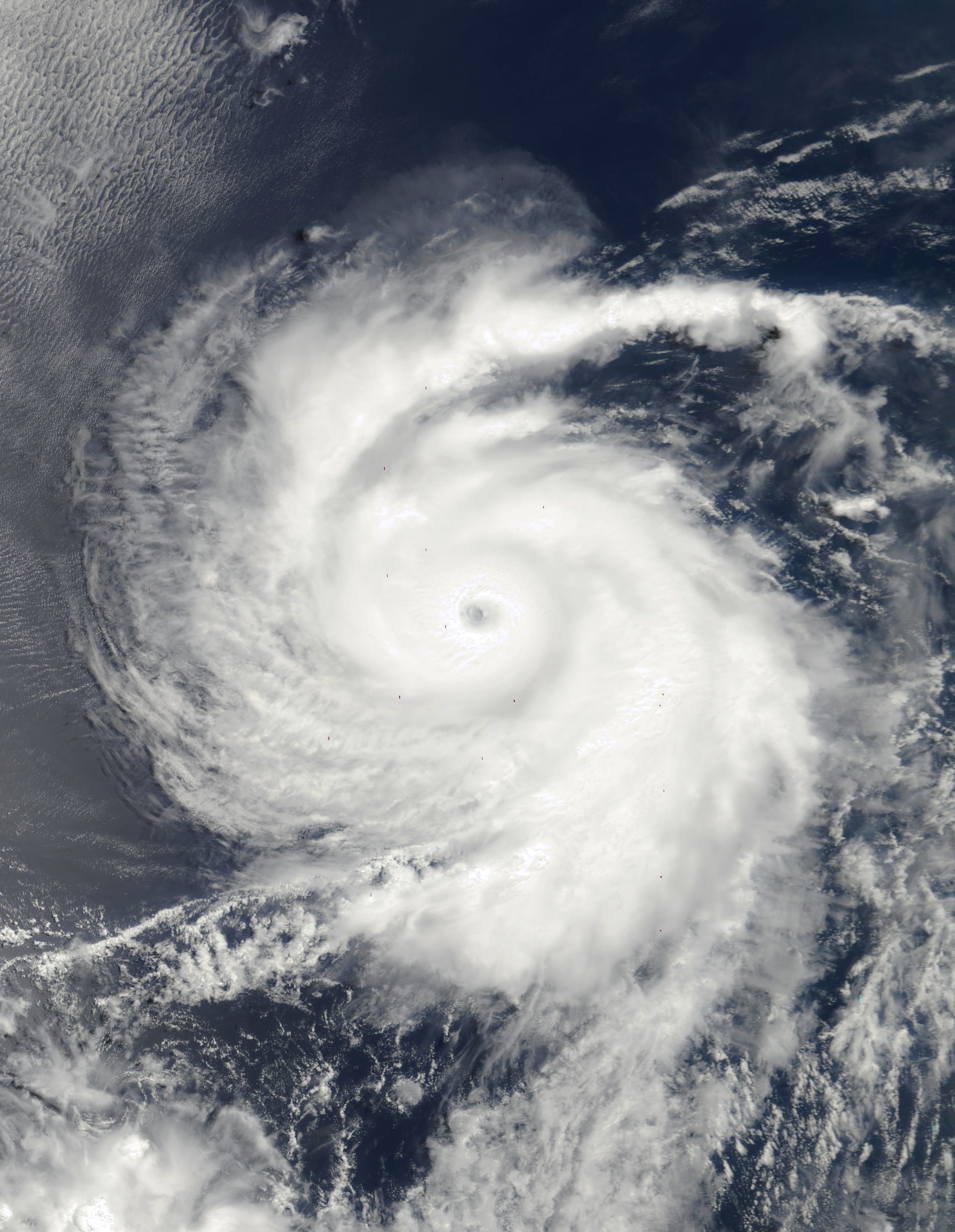
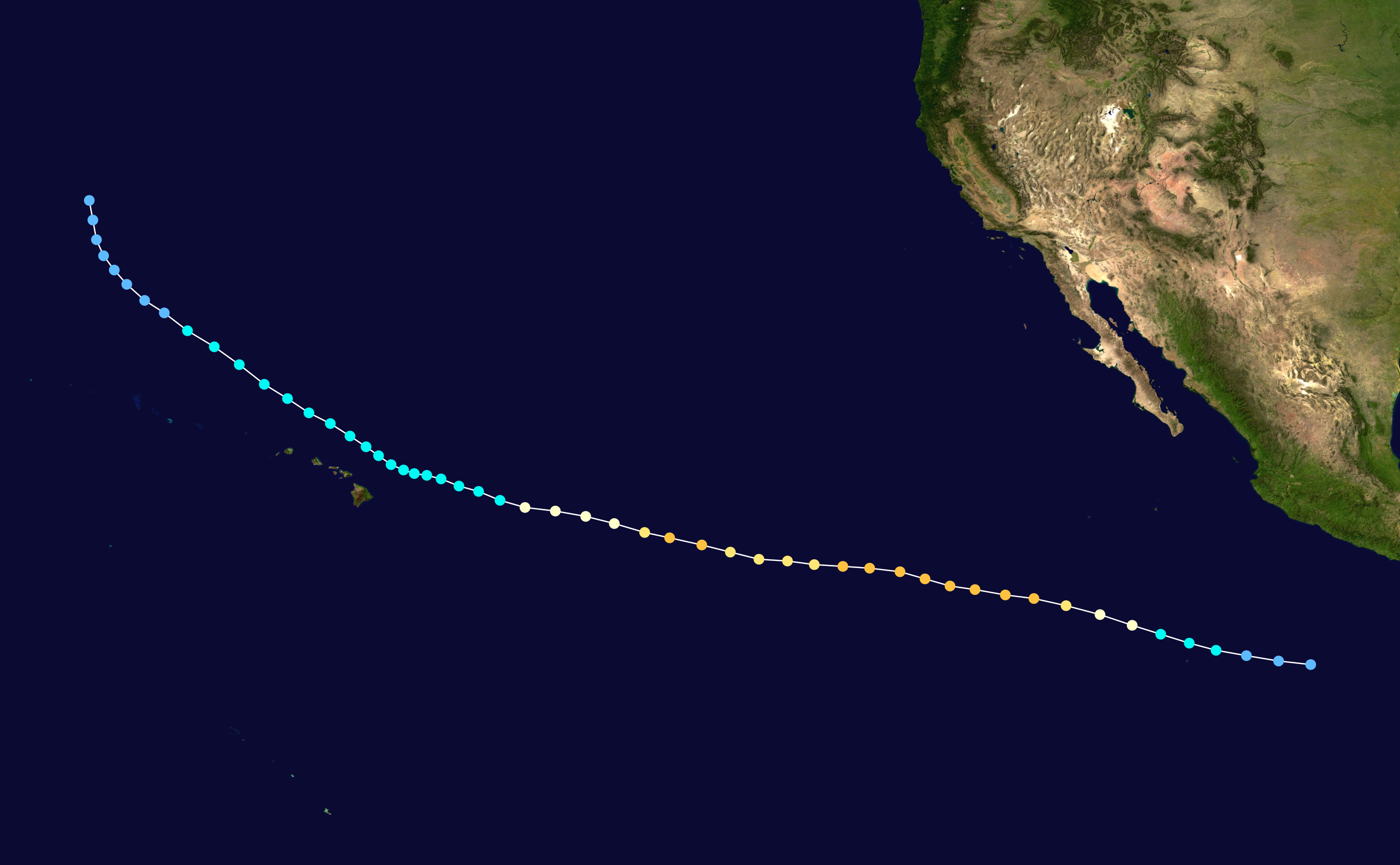
- Duration: July 23 – August 5
- Peak intensity: 125 mph (205 km/h) (1-min); 954 mbar (hPa)

A tropical wave exited western Africa on July 8, and crossed the Atlantic without any development. The wave reached the eastern Pacific by July 20, developing a low pressure area two days later. On July 23, the system organized into Tropical Depression Six-E, located about 660 mi (1,065 km) south-southeast of Manzanillo, Colima. The system continued generally to the west-northwest for much of its duration, steered by a subtropical ridge to its north. Late on July 23, the depression strengthened into Tropical Storm Daniel, which attained hurricane status a day later. A small eye-like feature formed in the center of the convection, which grew to a diameter of 17 mi (28 km) as it organized. Late on July 25, Daniel attained peak winds of 125 mph (205 km/h) and a minimum pressure of 954 mbar (28.2 inHg); this made it a Category 3 hurricane. After maintaining peak winds for about 12 hours, Daniel weakened and fell to Category 2 status on July 27. A day later, Daniel re-intensified to a secondary peak of 120 mph (195 km/h), only to weaken again due to increased wind shear. On July 29, Daniel entered the central Pacific as a minimal hurricane, and it dropped to tropical storm status the next day. Around that time, a trough weakened the subtropical ridge to Daniel's north, resulting in a more northwesterly track. Late on July 31, the storm passed about 145 mi (230 km) northeast of Hilo, Hawaii. Remaining north of the Hawaiian islands, Daniel weakened to a tropical depression on August 3 after the thunderstorms dwindled over the circulation. It turned more to the north, dissipating on August 5 to the northeast of Midway Island.

On July 30, the CPHC forecasted that Daniel would move across the Hawaiian islands as a weakening tropical storm. As a result, the agency issued tropical storm warnings for Maui and the Big Island, with a tropical storm watch for Oahu and Kauai. Daniel produced 10 ft (3.0 m) waves along the eastern shore of the Big Island. Rainbands from Daniel produced thunderstorms over the Big Island and Maui.

=== Tropical Storm Emilia ===
- Tropical storm (SSHWS)
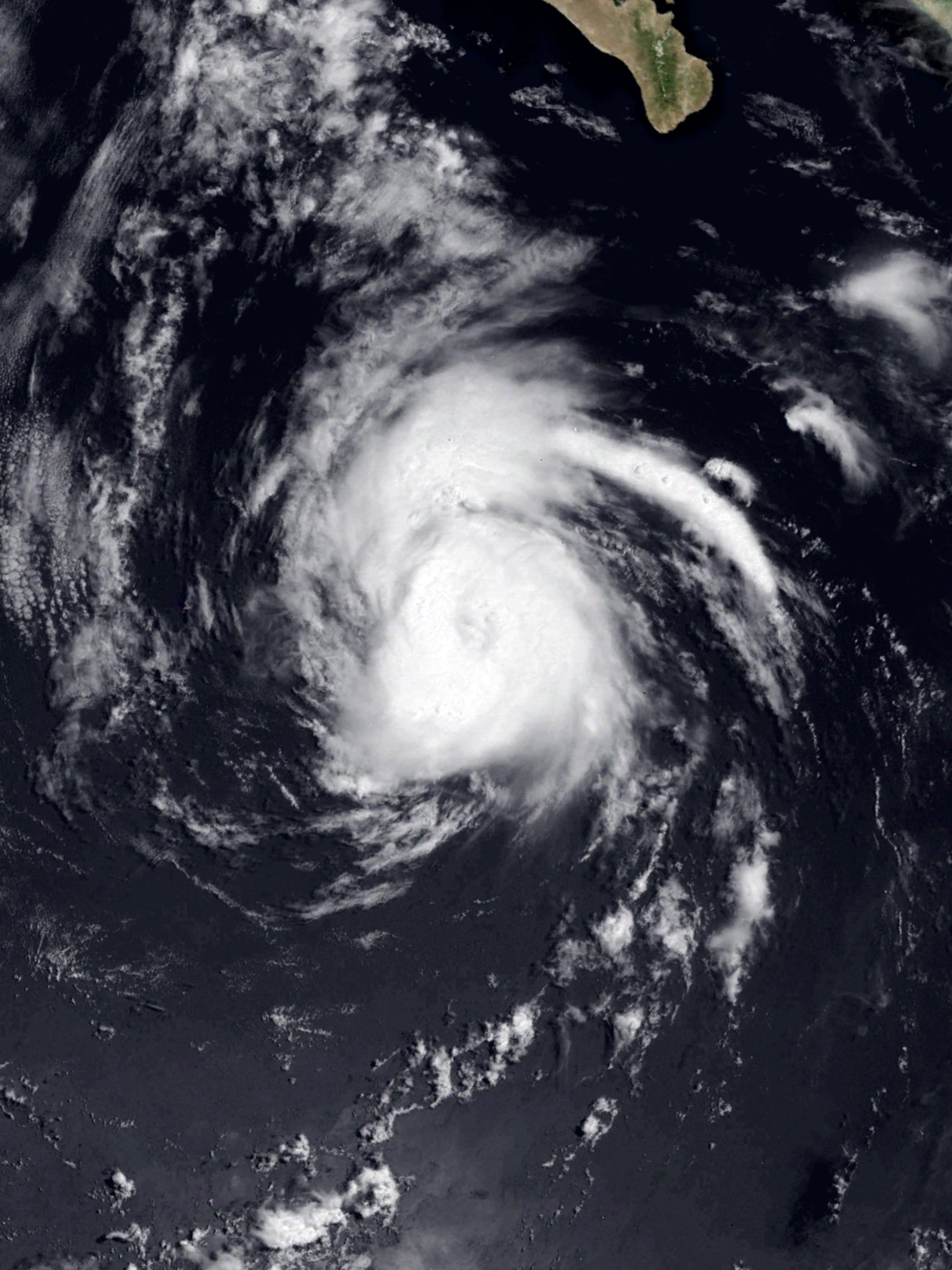
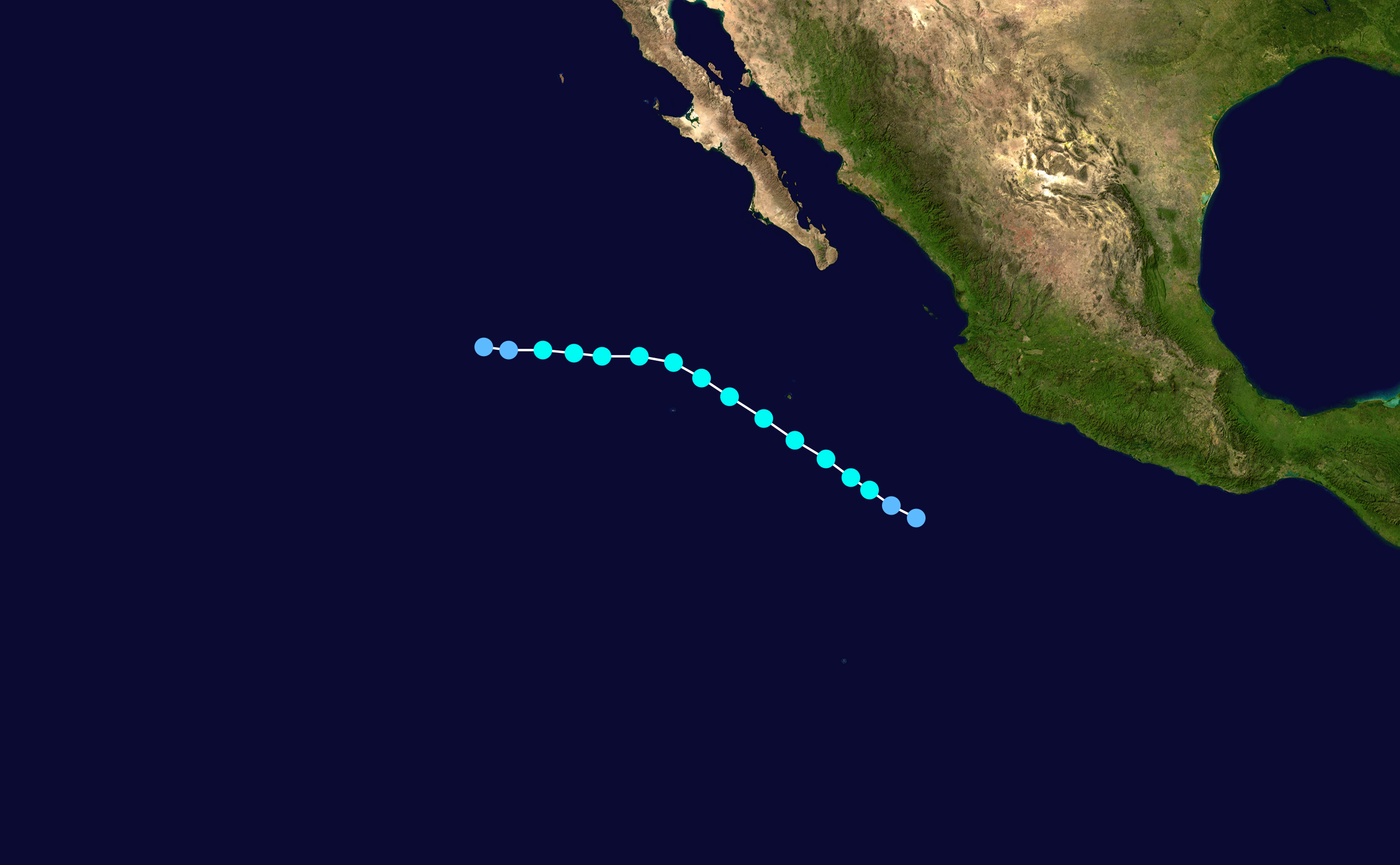
- Duration: July 26 – July 30
- Peak intensity: 65 mph (100 km/h) (1-min); 994 mbar (hPa)

On July 11, a tropical wave moved off the African coast. After moving across the Atlantic and Caribbean, it crossed Central America on July 22. Three days later, the system showed signs of organization. It developed into Tropical Depression Seven-E on July 26, about 335 mi (535 km) southwest of Manzanillo, Mexico. The depression quickly strengthened into Tropical Storm Emilia. The storm moved to the west-northwest, steered by a ridge to its north. The NHC initially forecast Emilia to attain hurricane status. Late on July 27, Emilia attained peak winds of 65 mph (110 km/h) while passing just southwest of Socorro Island. Soon after, the storm moved into cooler waters and drier air, causing the convection to diminish. Emilia turned westward on July 29, and around that time it fell to tropical depression status. It dissipated the next day, located well to the west-southwest of the Baja California peninsula.

=== Tropical Storm Fabio ===
- Tropical storm (SSHWS)
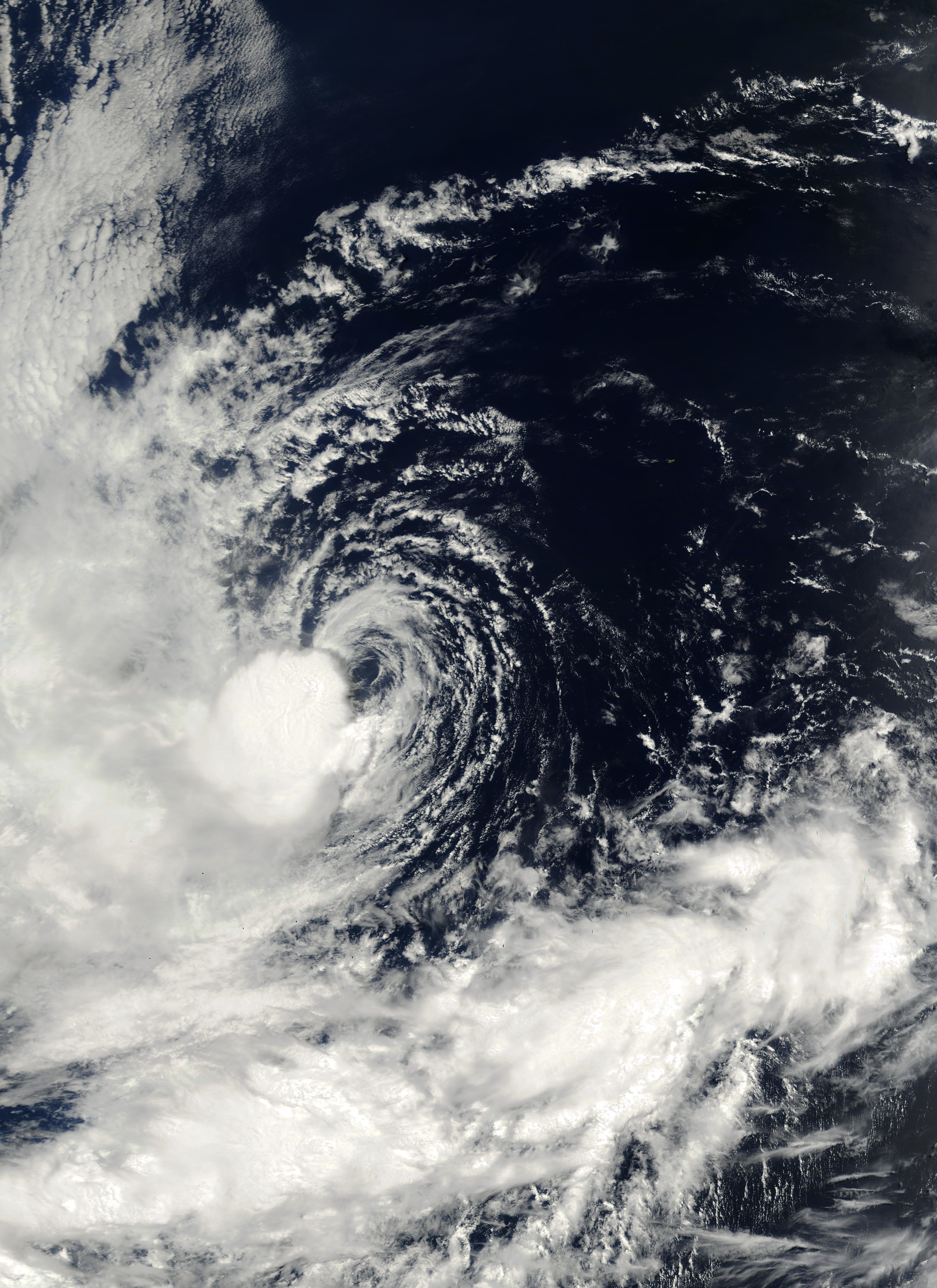
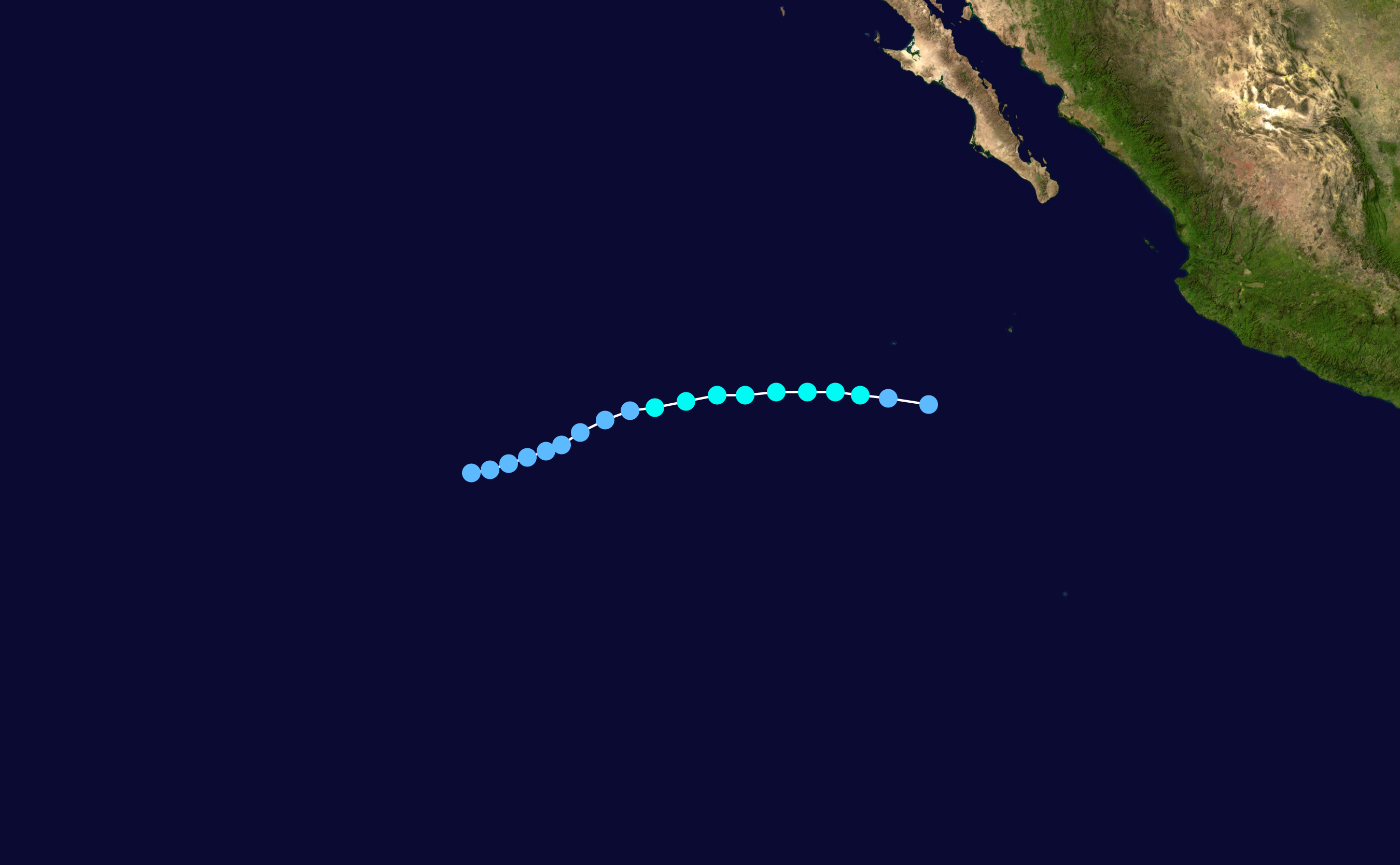
- Duration: August 3 – August 8
- Peak intensity: 50 mph (85 km/h) (1-min); 999 mbar (hPa)

On July 19, a tropical wave exited western Africa, and eight days later entered into the eastern Pacific. The wave first showed signs of organization on August 1 as it continued to the west. On August 3, Tropical Depression Eight-E developed about 620 mi (1,000 km) west-southwest of Manzanillo, Colima. A day later, the depression strengthened into Tropical Storm Fabio. Despite the presence of wind shear, Fabio strengthened further to reach peak winds of 50 mph (85 km/h) on August 4. Soon after, the wind shear stripped the convection from the circulation, causing the storm to weaken. Fabio fell to tropical depression status on August 6, and by that time the circulation was becoming elongated. Nearby Hurricane Gilma increased wind shear over the area, and Fabio's circulation dissipated on August 8. The remnants continued to interact with the Gilma over the next few days.

=== Hurricane Gilma ===
- Category 1 hurricane (SSHWS)
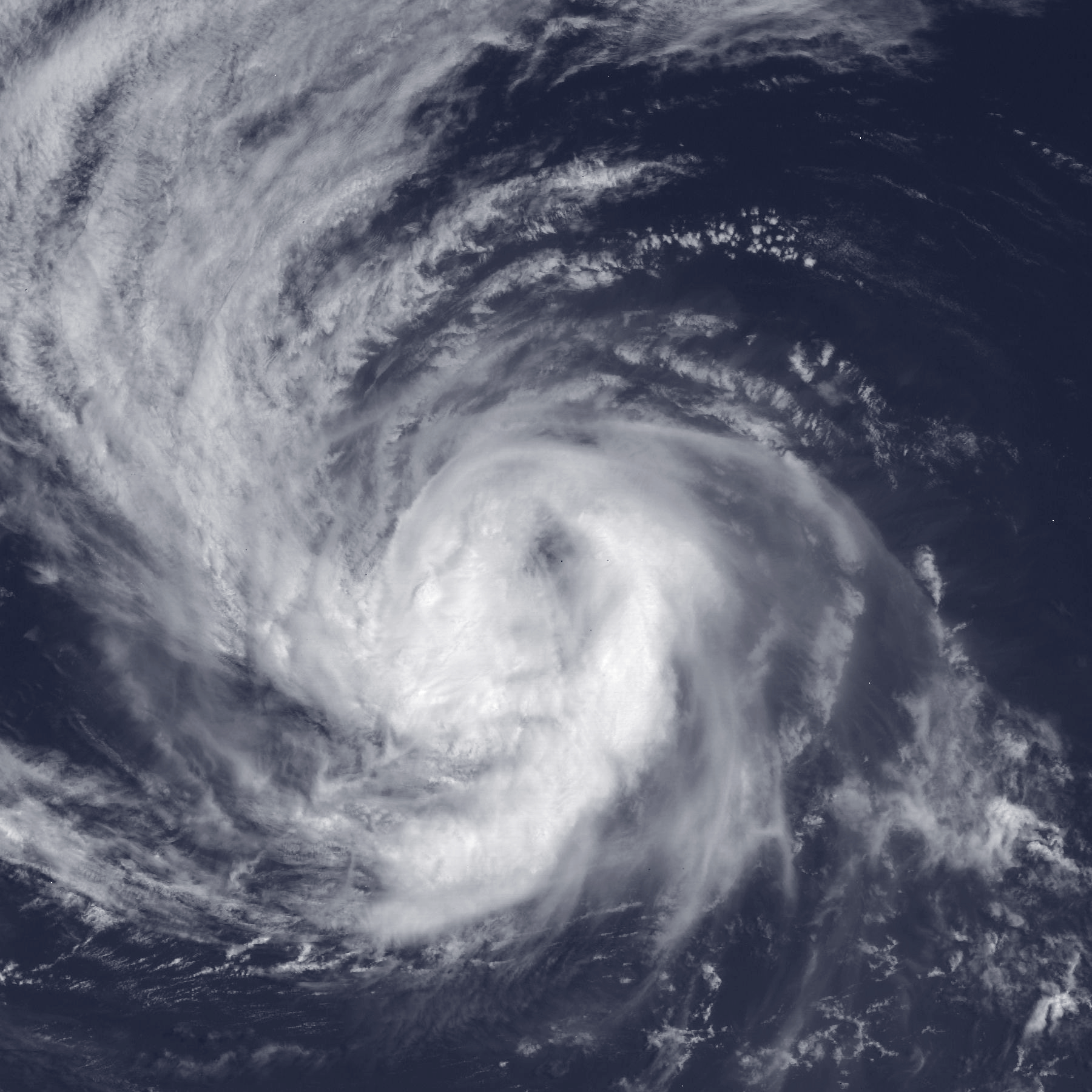
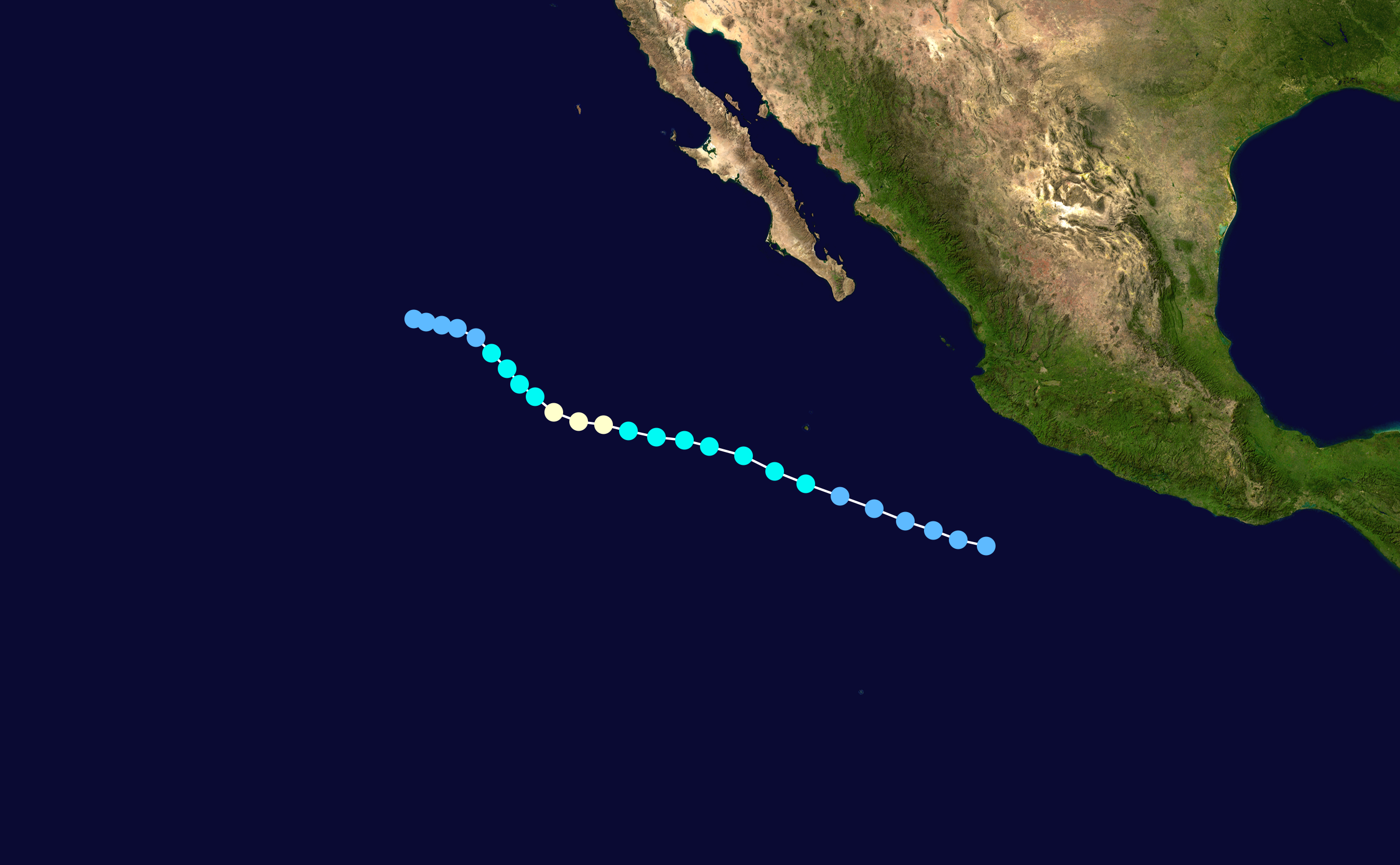
- Duration: August 5 – August 11
- Peak intensity: 80 mph (130 km/h) (1-min); 984 mbar (hPa)

Gilma's precursor was a tropical wave that moved off the African coast by July 21. The wave entered the East Pacific on August 2, and the formation of a well-defined center led to the formation of a depression on August 5, 250 nautical miles south of Manzanillo, Mexico. The system strengthened into a tropical storm at 12:00 UTC that day, at which point it became known as Gilma. Gilma gradually intensified and became a hurricane on August 8 at 6:00 UTC. Gilma reached peak intensity six hours later, with 80 mph (130 km/h) winds and a minimum pressure of 984 mbar (29.1 inHg). Soon after, Gilma moved over cooler waters, and it steadily weakened thereafter. It fell to tropical depression status early on August 10, dissipating later that day as it lost its remaining thunderstorms.

=== Hurricane Hector ===
- Category 1 hurricane (SSHWS)
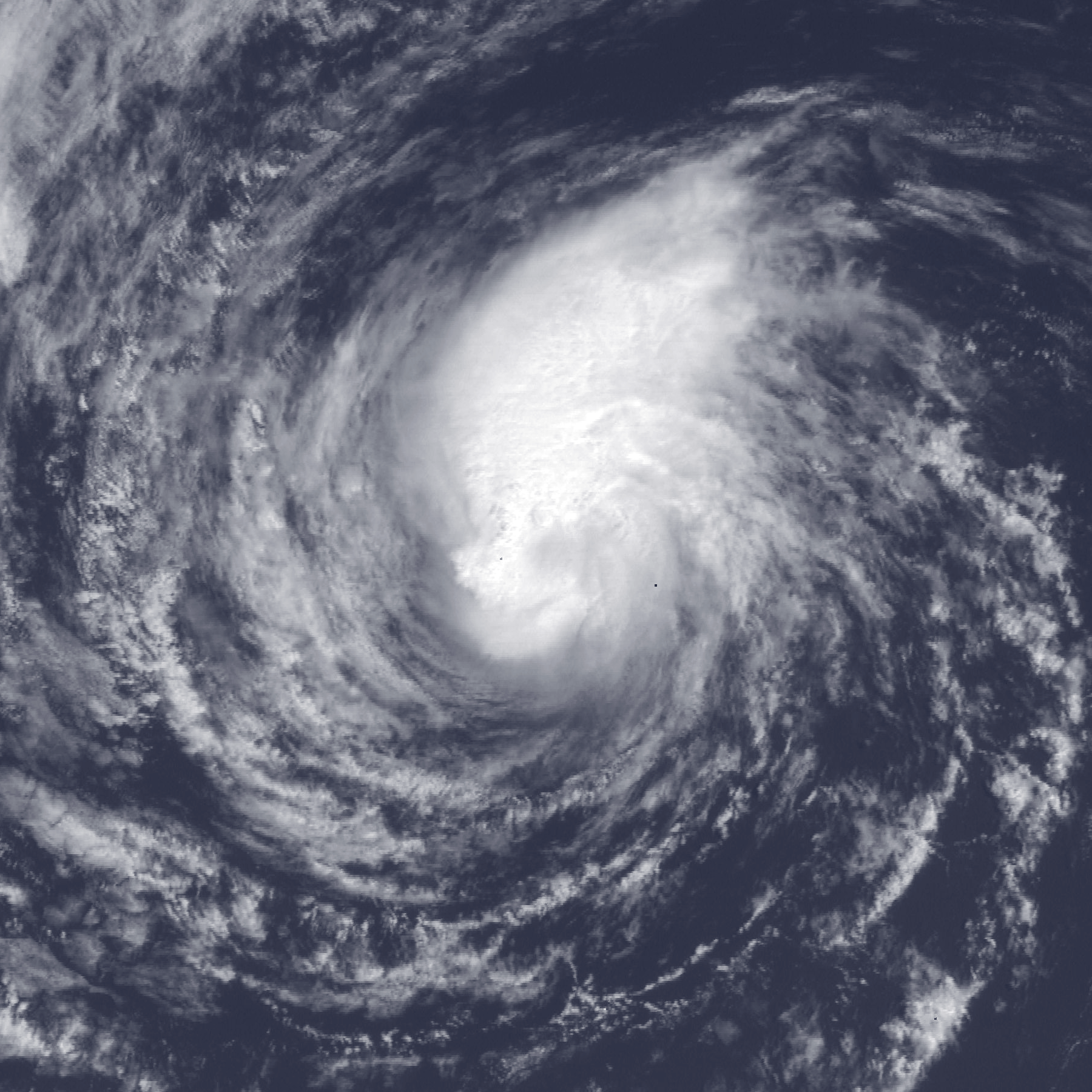
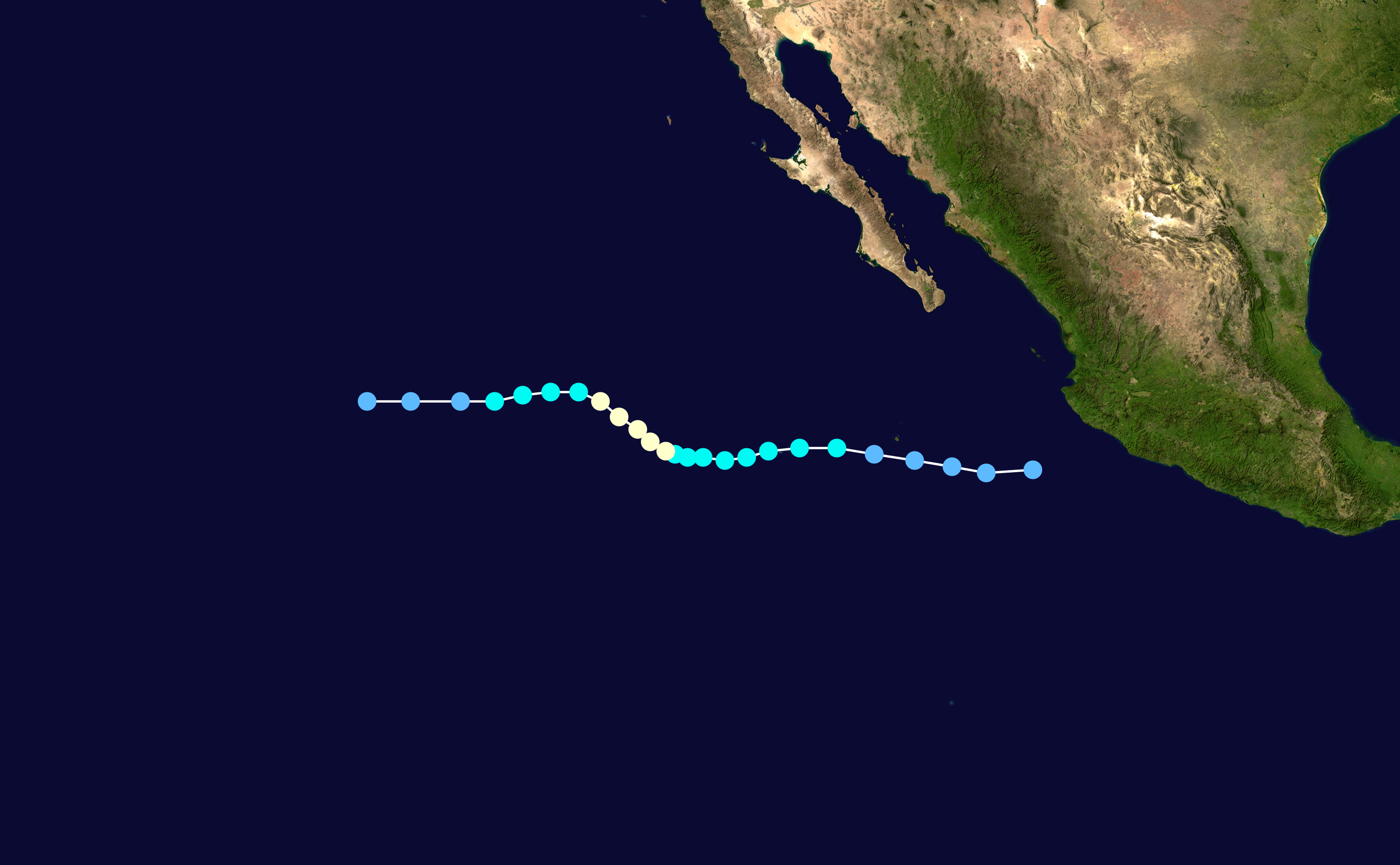
- Duration: August 10 – August 16
- Peak intensity: 80 mph (130 km/h) (1-min); 983 mbar (hPa)

In late July, a tropical wave exited Western Africa, reaching the eastern Pacific on August 9. Deep convection developed and organized, leading to the formation of a tropical depression on August 10. It was located about 185 mi (295 km) southwest of Manzanillo, Colima, and continued generally westward under the influence of a strong ridge. The depression quickly strengthened into Tropical Storm Hector, as it developing banding features, a central dense overcast, and a ragged eye. Hector became a hurricane on August 14, and it reached peak intensity 12 hours later with 80 mph (130 kn/h) winds. Subsequently, cooler waters and wind shear caused the hurricane to weaken. Hector fell to tropical storm status on August 15, and further to a tropical depression a day later, after the thunderstorms dwindled. The circulation dissipated on August 16, although the remnants continued westward and interacted with an upper-level trough. On August 20, the remnants of Hector produced thunderstorms and heavy rainfall across the Hawaii Islands. Flooding severely damaged eight homes in Waikele on Oʻahu. Wind gusts on the island reached 40 mph (64 km/h), which felled tree limbs and caused power outages. The thunderstorms also flooded streams and roadways on the islands of Maui, Molokaʻi, and Hawaii.

=== Tropical Storm Ileana ===
- Tropical storm (SSHWS)
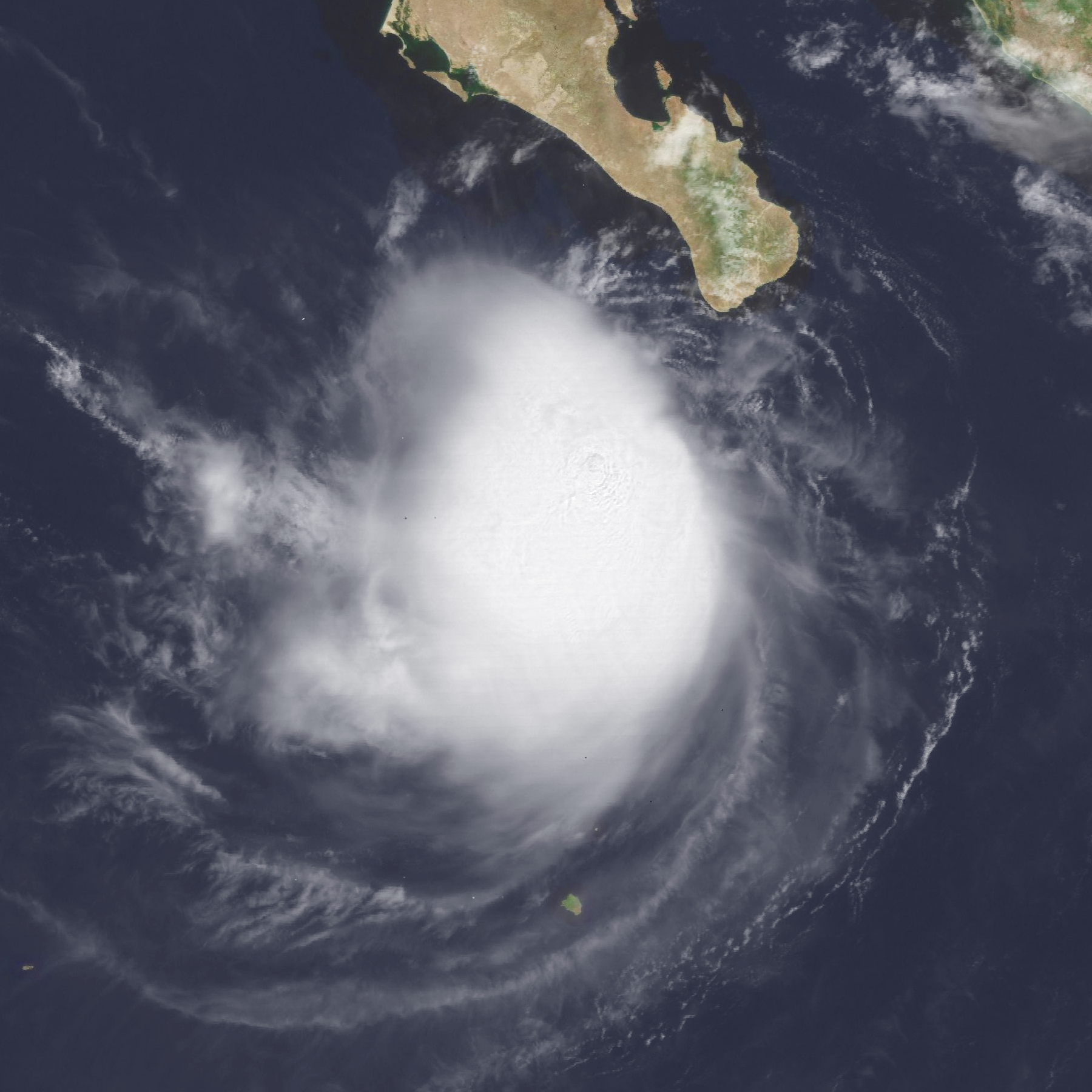
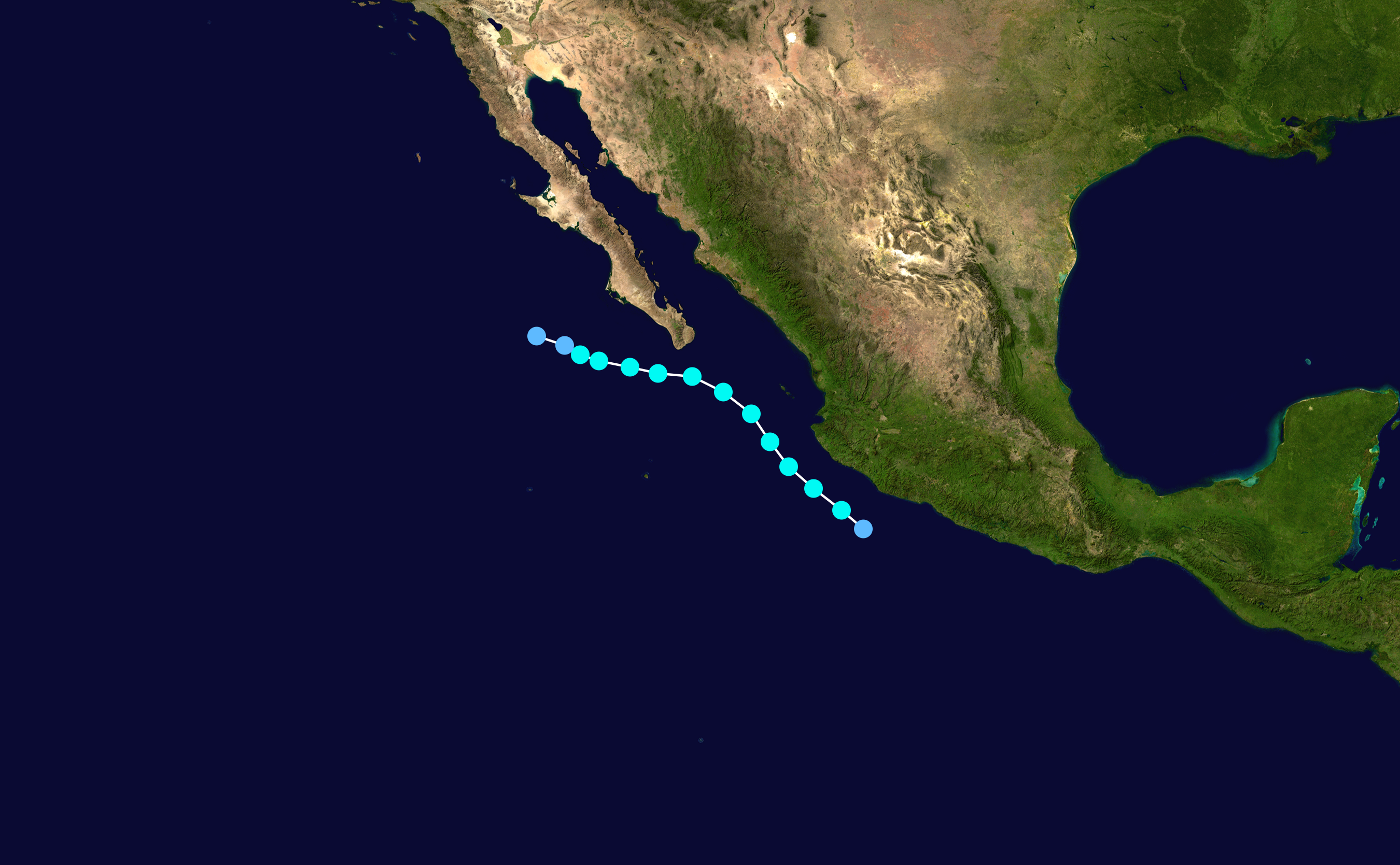
- Duration: August 13 – August 17
- Peak intensity: 70 mph (110 km/h) (1-min); 991 mbar (hPa)

A tropical wave emerged from the African coast on August 1. The wave later crossed Central America and southern Mexico into the Eastern Pacific. On August 13, a tropical depression developed near the southwest coast of Mexico. Early the next day, the depression strengthened into Tropical Storm Ileana. The storm paralleled the Mexican coast as it moved northwestward, steered by a ridge to the north. On August 15, Ileana attained peak winds of 70 mph (110 km/h) winds, with a minimum pressure of 991 mbar (29.3 inHg). Later that day, the storm passed just south of the Baja California peninsula at peak intensity. Ileana turned westward and weakened due to stronger wind shear. It fell to tropical depression status on August 16 and dissipated a day later. The remnants of Ileana continued westward, persisting until August 20.

The storm brought rainfall to much of Mexico from August 11–15. The highest precipitation total was 6.00 in (152 mm), recorded in Ruiz, Nayarit.

=== Tropical Storm Wene ===
- Tropical storm (SSHWS)
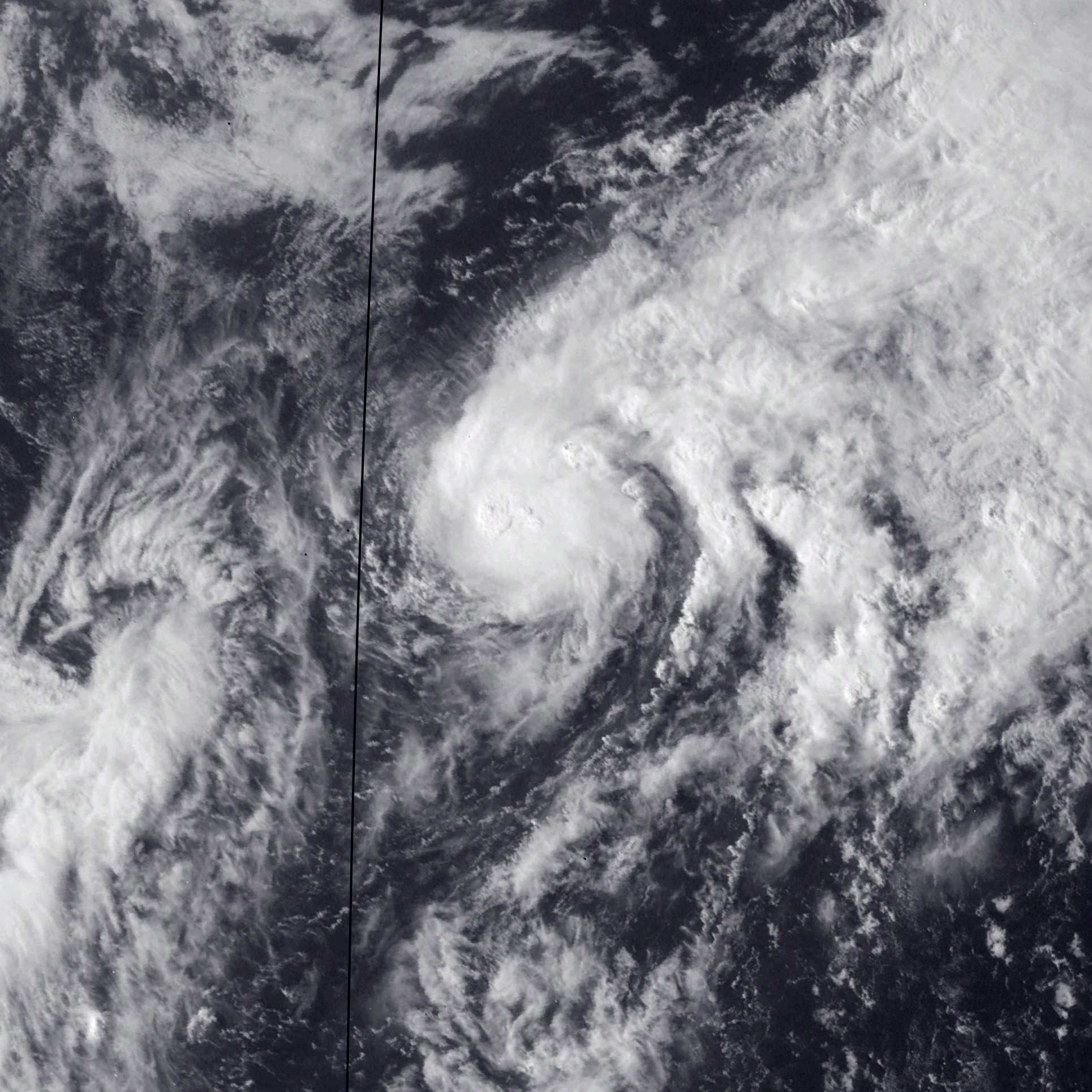
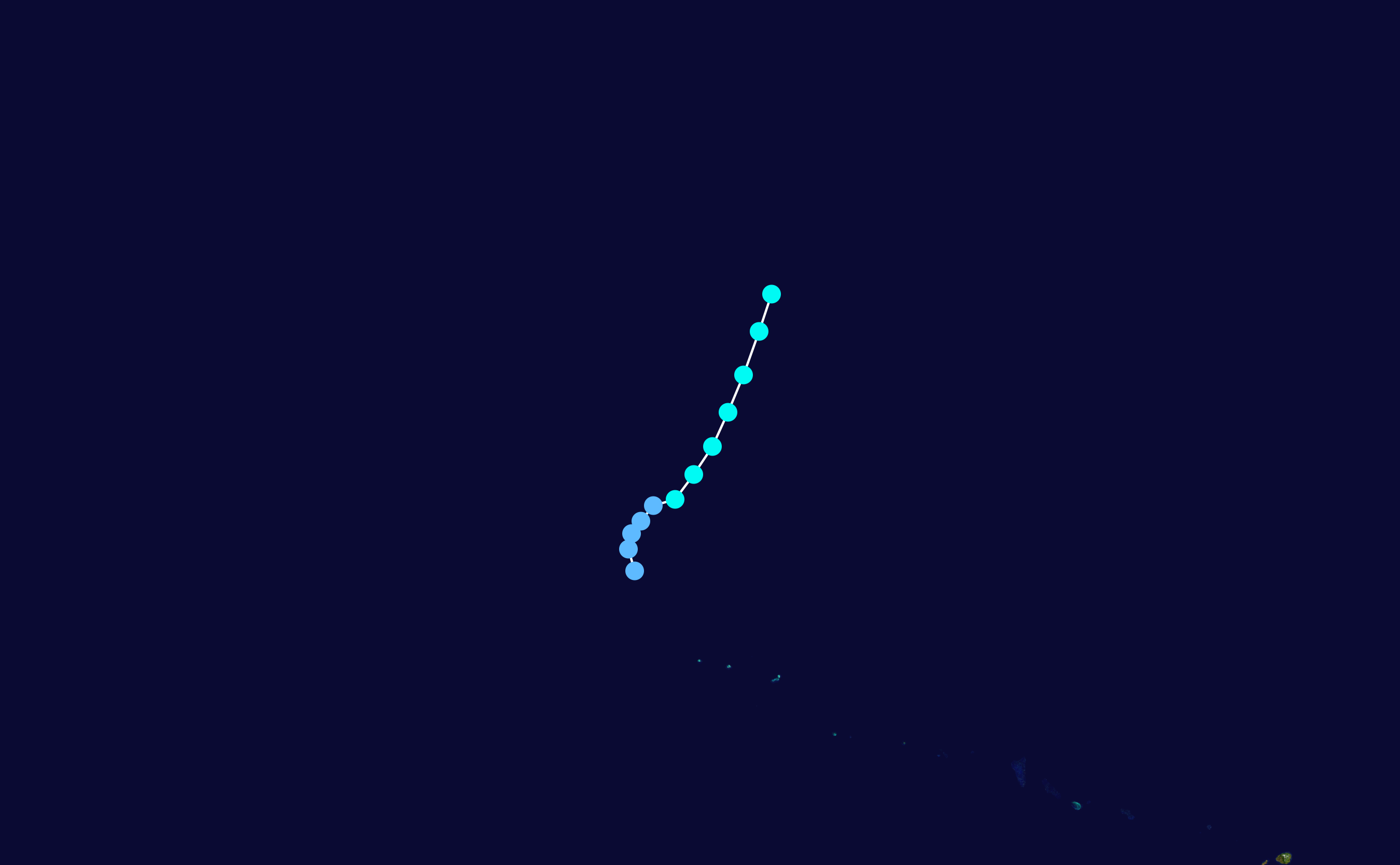
- Duration: August 15 (Entered basin) – August 17
- Peak intensity: 50 mph (85 km/h) (1-min); 1002 mbar (hPa)

A tropical disturbance developed in the Western Pacific Ocean along the eastern periphery of the monsoon trough in mid-August. Located at 33° north, it steadily organized, and became Tropical Depression Sixteen-W on August 15 while located 1,700 miles (2,700 km) to the northwest of Honolulu, Hawaii. It moved eastward along the west–east-oriented surface pressure trough, and crossed the International Date Line later on August 15. Abnormally warm sea surface temperatures allowed the system to intensify despite its unusually high latitude, and it became Tropical Storm Wene on August 16. It quickly attained a peak intensity of 50 mph (80 km/h), but weakened due to colder sea surface temperatures and wind shear. Wene continued to weaken, and dissipated when the storm merged with an extratropical cyclone.

The name Wene is Hawaiian for "Wayne".

=== Tropical Storm John ===
- Tropical storm (SSHWS)
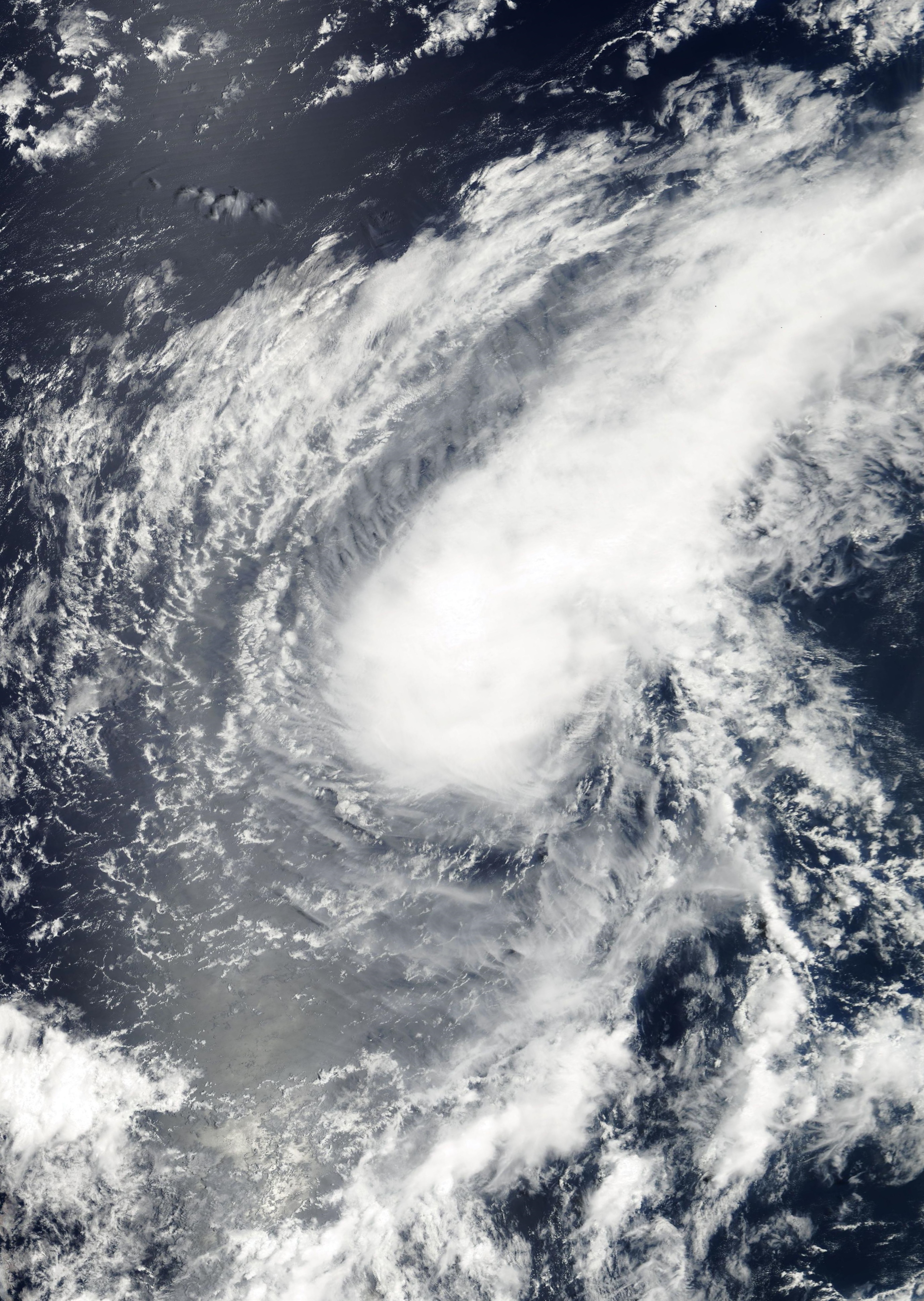
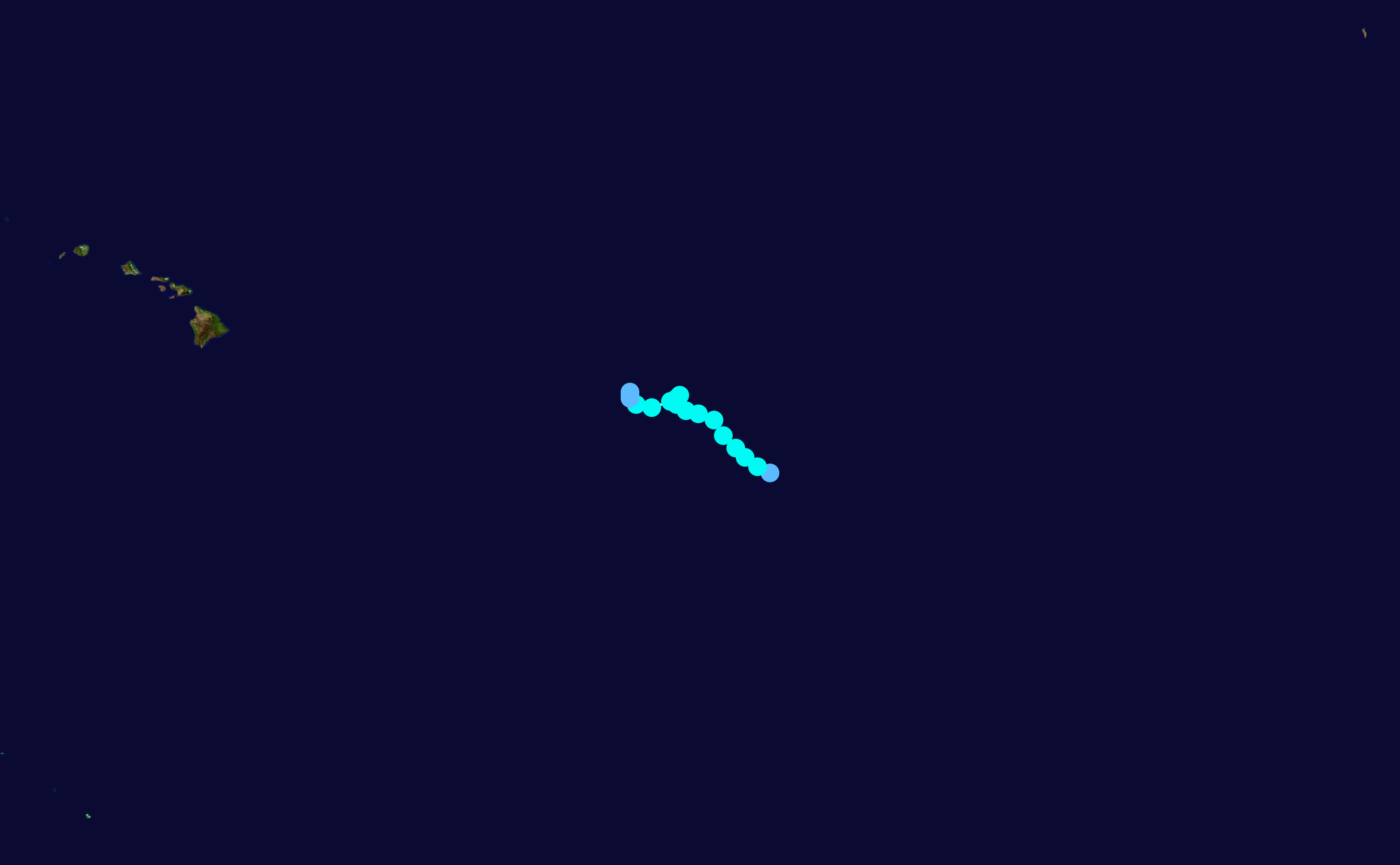
- Duration: August 28 – September 1
- Peak intensity: 70 mph (110 km/h) (1-min); 994 mbar (hPa)

The Intertropical Convergence Zone (ITCZ) produced an area of thunderstorms on August 25, well to the southwest of Mexico. By the next day, a circulation had formed, which organized further into a tropical depression on August 28. It quickly strengthened into Tropical Storm John. Steered by a ridge to its north, the storm moved slowly northwestward, crossing into the Central Pacific on August 30. Later that day, John attained peak winds of 70 mph (110 km/h), after developing a central dense overcast. Subsequent to its peak, the storm's movement became slow and erratic as wind shear increased. On September 1, John weakened to tropical depression status, and later that day, it dissipated about 865 mi (1,390 km) southeast of Hawaii.

=== Tropical Storm Kristy ===
- Tropical storm (SSHWS)
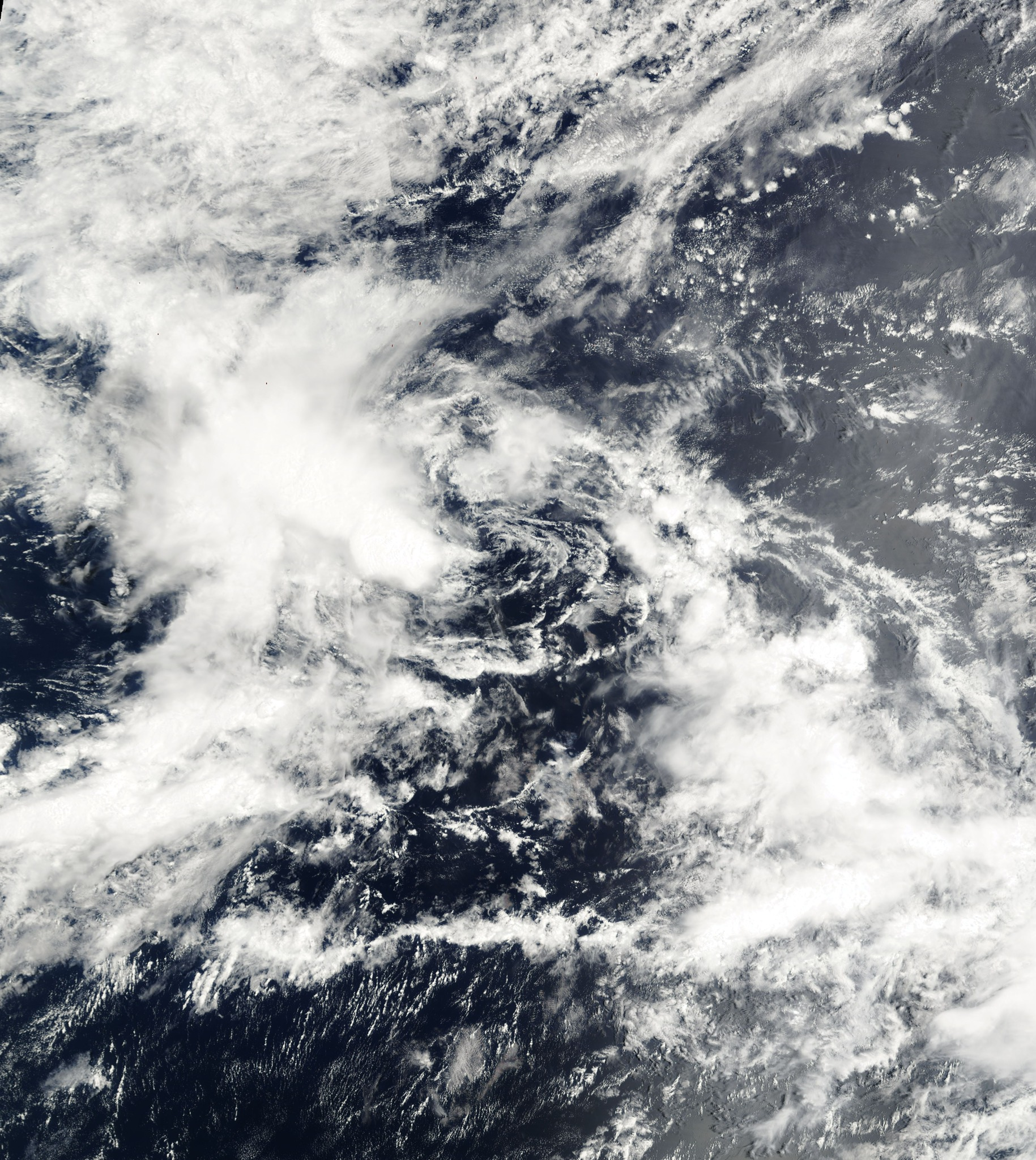
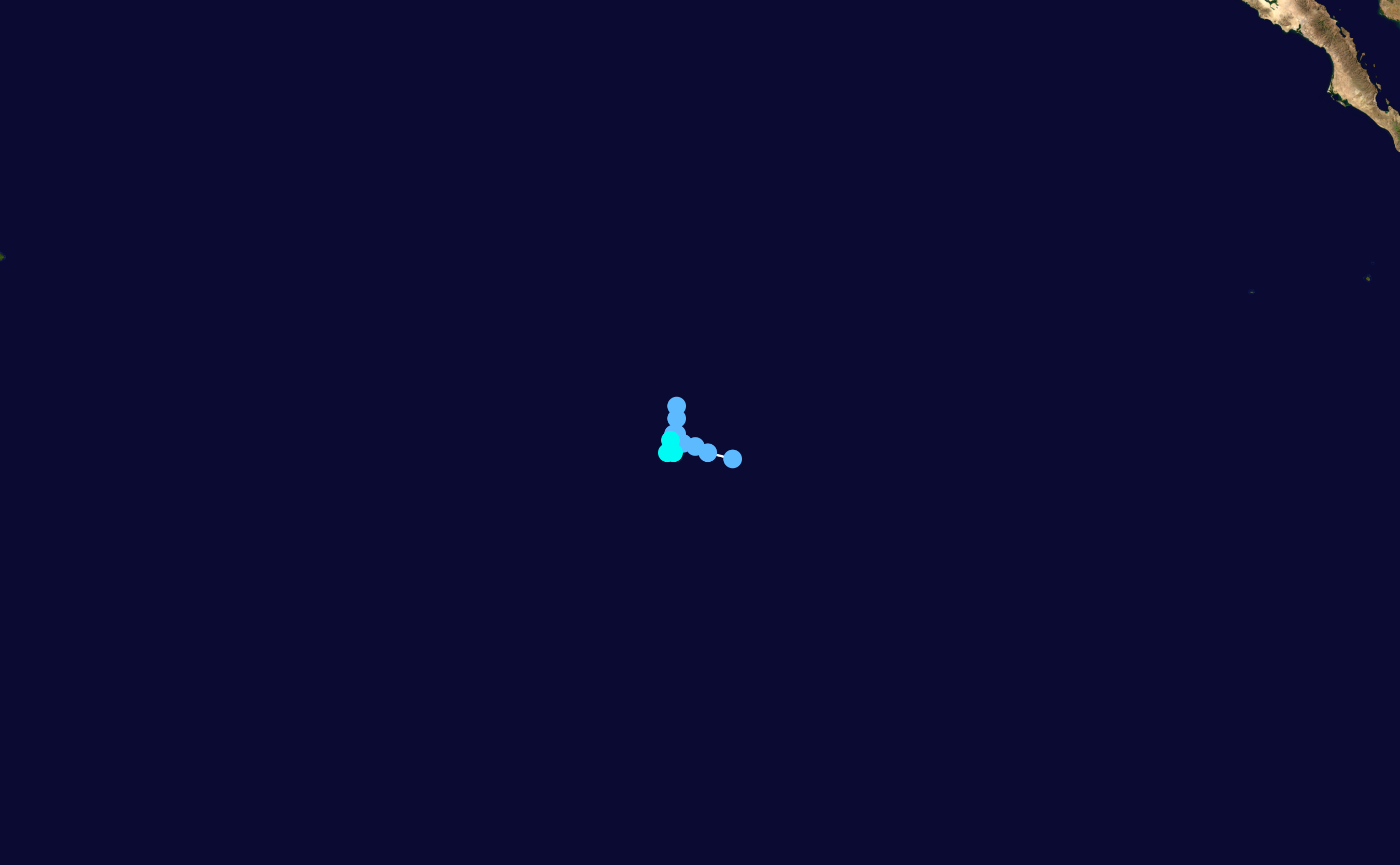
- Duration: August 31 – September 3
- Peak intensity: 40 mph (65 km/h) (1-min); 1004 mbar (hPa)

The same tropical wave that spawned Tropical Storm Chris in the Atlantic later crossed into the eastern Pacific on August 22. Continuing to the west, it organized into Tropical Depression Fourteen-E on August 31. Despite significant shear, the depression strengthened into Tropical Storm Kristy on September 2, with peak winds of 40 mph (65 km/h). Kristy meandered far from land over the open ocean, and was soon affected by wind shear. Within 18 hours of attaining tropical storm status, Kristy fell to tropical depression strength. It dissipated on September 3 just 130 mi (210 km) from where Kristy formed.

=== Hurricane Lane ===
- Category 2 hurricane (SSHWS)
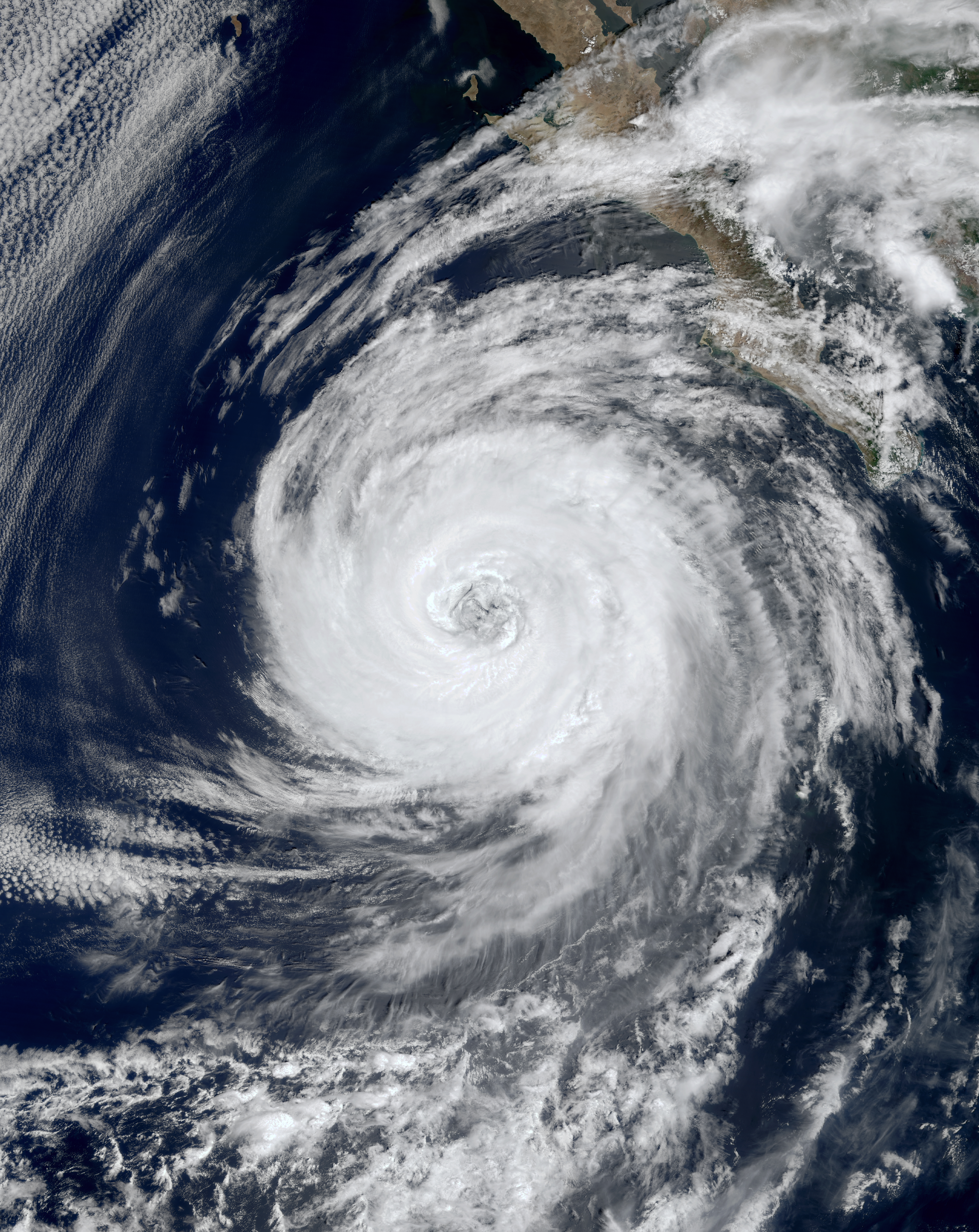
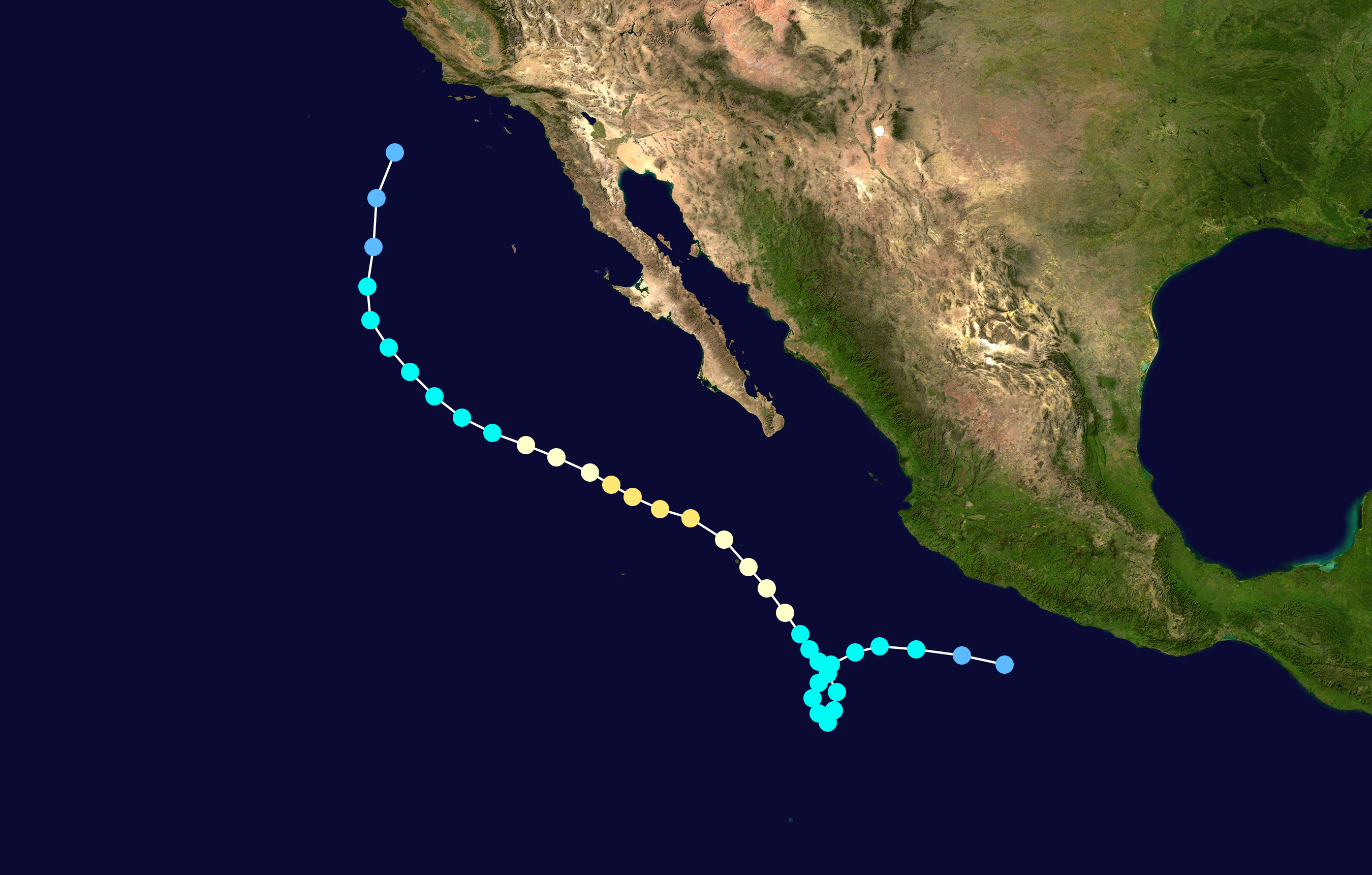
- Duration: September 5 – September 14
- Peak intensity: 100 mph (155 km/h) (1-min); 967 mbar (hPa)

The precursor to Lane was a tropical wave that formed in the Atlantic Ocean on August 20. The wave moved across the Atlantic basin without development and crossed Central America on August 29. By September 1, the system was beginning to organize south of Mexico. On September 4, the system became a tropical depression 140 miles (230 km) southwest of Manzanillo, Mexico. The next day the tropical depression became Tropical Storm Lane. After becoming a tropical storm, Lane executed a counter-clockwise loop, during that maneuver, the storm crossed its own wake and weakened slightly. The NHC described the loop as "quite rare in the eastern Pacific". After finishing the loop, Lane continued westward and reached hurricane strength on September 9 while passing over Socorro Island. A day later, Lane attained peak winds of 100 mph (155 km/h), making it a Category 2 hurricane. By September 11, Lane encountered cooler waters which weakened the hurricane back to tropical storm strength. A developing trough turned Lane to the northeast towards the West Coast of the United States. On September 13, Lane passed over cooler waters, causing it to weaken to a tropical depression. Lane then dissipated on the next day.

Lane passed directly over Socorro Island, where a weather station recorded a pressure of 973 mbar (28.7 inHg). Although the center of Lane was well offshore, it still brought heavy surf that closed several ports in Mexico. In Jose del Cabo, Mexico, a weather station reported winds of 32 mph (51 km/h). Lane's remnants affected the Western United States. The moisture from Lane produced thunderstorms in California.

=== Tropical Storm Miriam ===
- Tropical storm (SSHWS)
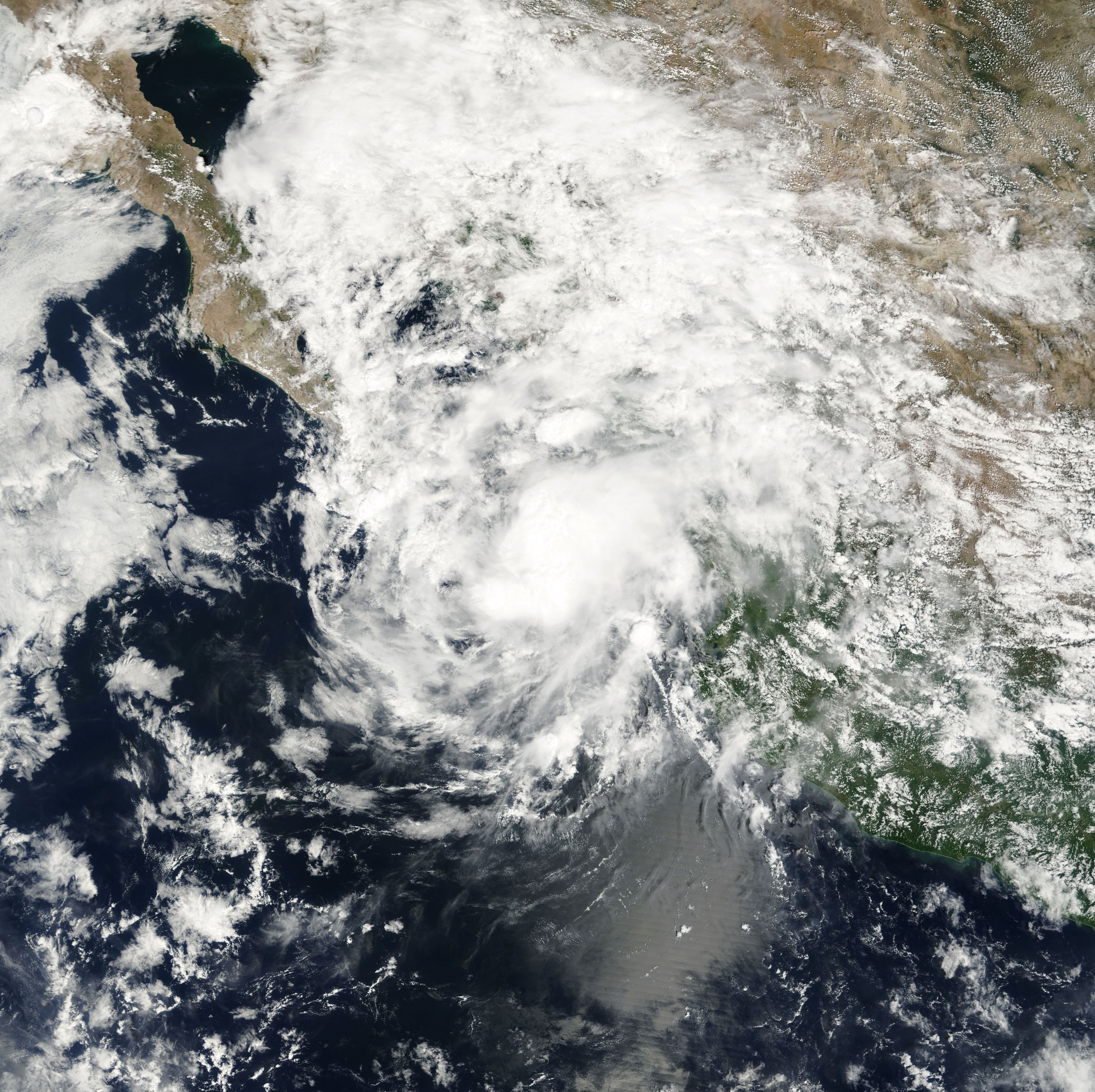
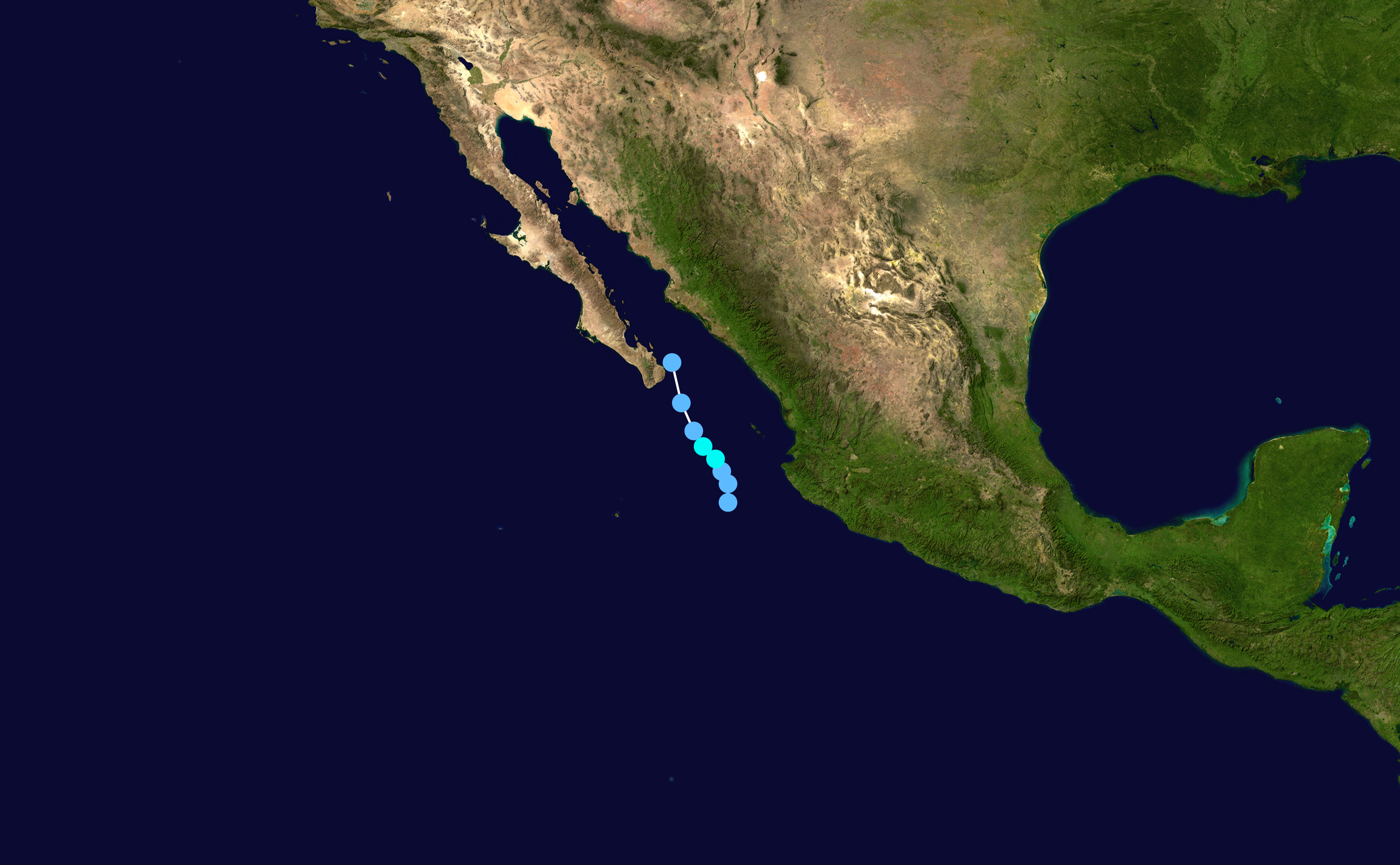
- Duration: September 15 – September 17
- Peak intensity: 40 mph (65 km/h) (1-min); 1004 mbar (hPa)

A tropical wave moved off the coast of Africa on August 29. It remained weak as it moved westward across the Atlantic Ocean and entered the Pacific Ocean on September 9. As it moved west-northwestward, it organized and developed into Tropical Depression Fifteen-E on September 15 while 290 miles (470 km) east-southeast of Cabo San Lucas. Banding features became more pronounced, though convection remained intermittent. On September 16, the depression briefly became Tropical Storm Miriam, with peak winds of 40 mph (65 km/h). It quickly weakened back to a tropical depression as it continued north-northwestward. Miriam dissipated on September 17 while seventy miles (110 km) northeast of Cabo San Lucas.

In western Mexico, the storm dropped heavy rainfall, peaking at 7.68 in (195 mm) at La Cruz, Sinaloa. Precipitation in Los Cabos in Baja California Sur reached 6.54 in (166 mm). Storm damage in Baja California Sur totaled US$22,000 (MX$205,000), and four municipalities were declared disaster areas.

=== Tropical Storm Norman ===
- Tropical storm (SSHWS)
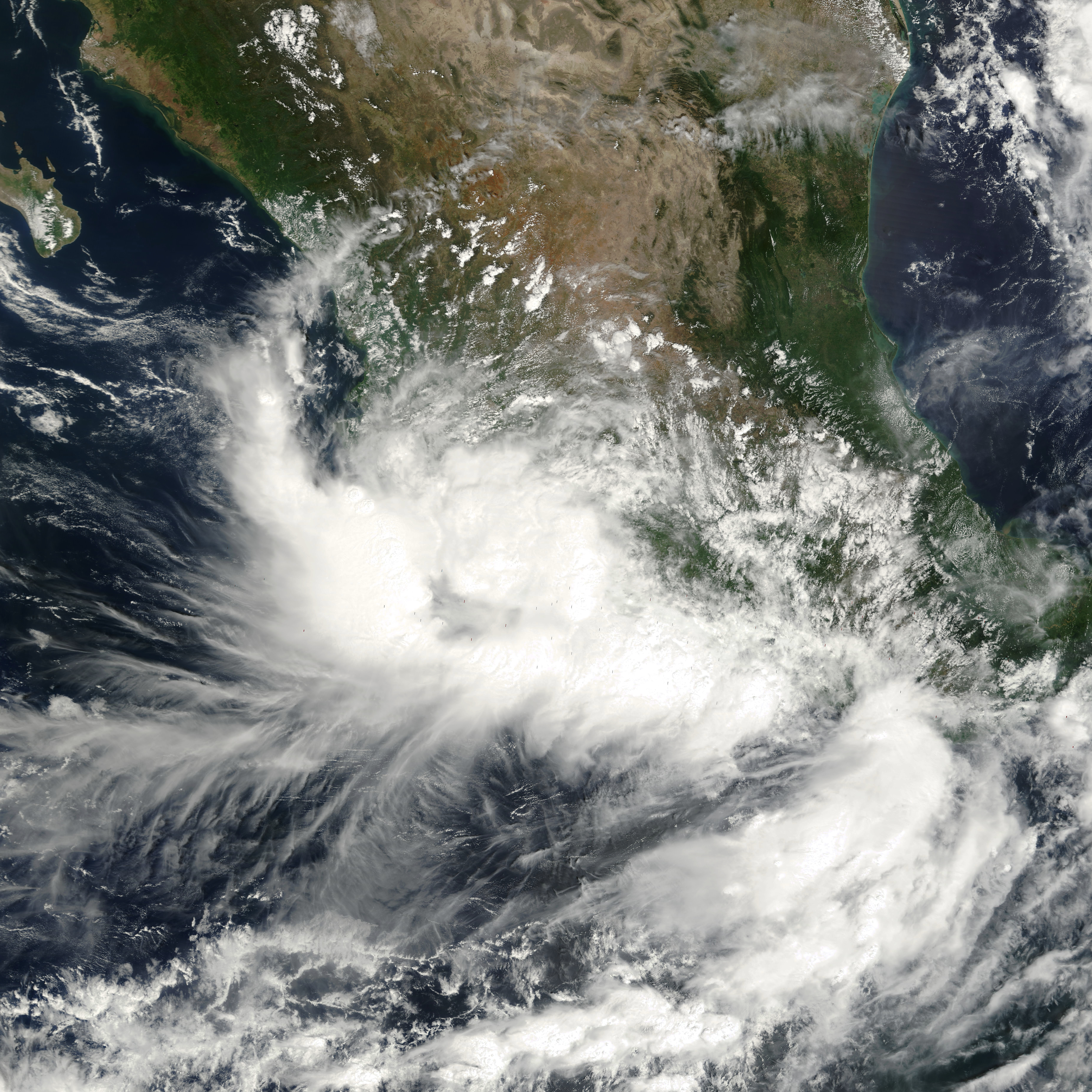
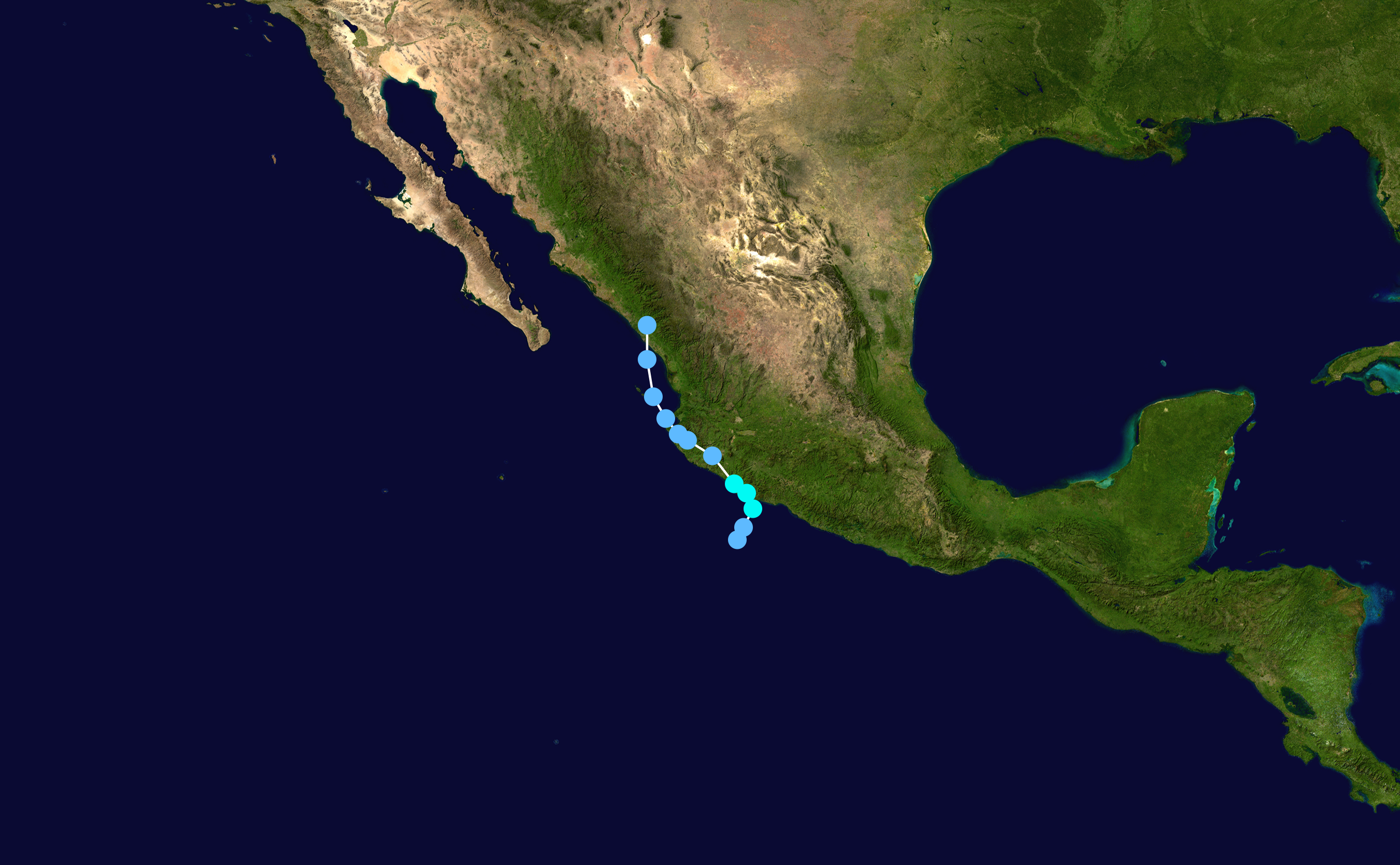
- Duration: September 20 – September 22
- Peak intensity: 50 mph (85 km/h) (1-min); 998 mbar (hPa)

The same tropical wave that spawned Atlantic Hurricane Gordon later crossed into the eastern Pacific by September 16. It gradually organized off the west coast of Mexico, developing into a tropical depression early on September 20, located about 205 miles (330 km) south-southwest of Manzanillo, Colima. It moved slowly northward, strengthening into Tropical Storm Norman. Late on September 20, Norman attained peak winds of 50 mph (85 km/h). Around 20:00 UTC that day, the storm made landfall west of Lázaro Cárdenas, Michoacán at peak intensity. Norman rapidly weakened to a tropical depression over land, but it reemerged over the Pacific on September 21. A day later, Norman made landfall near Mazatlán, Sinaloa, as a weak tropical depression. Within a few hours, the cyclone dissipated over land.

Norman produced heavy rainfall across western Mexico, peaking at 15.94 inches (405 mm). The rainfall caused severe flooding and mudslides, killing nine people. Five people died in Chiapas: four died from a mudslide in Tapachula and one person drowned. Four people died in Acapulco. About 300 families evacuated due to floods, and around 100 homes were damaged. The floods inundated roads, isolating three communities, and disrupting traffic between Colima and Michoacán. In the latter state, a bridge collapsed in Aquila, due to floodwaters. In Lázaro Cárdenas, damage to the port totaled US$18.8 million (MX$180 million).

=== Tropical Storm Olivia ===
- Tropical storm (SSHWS)
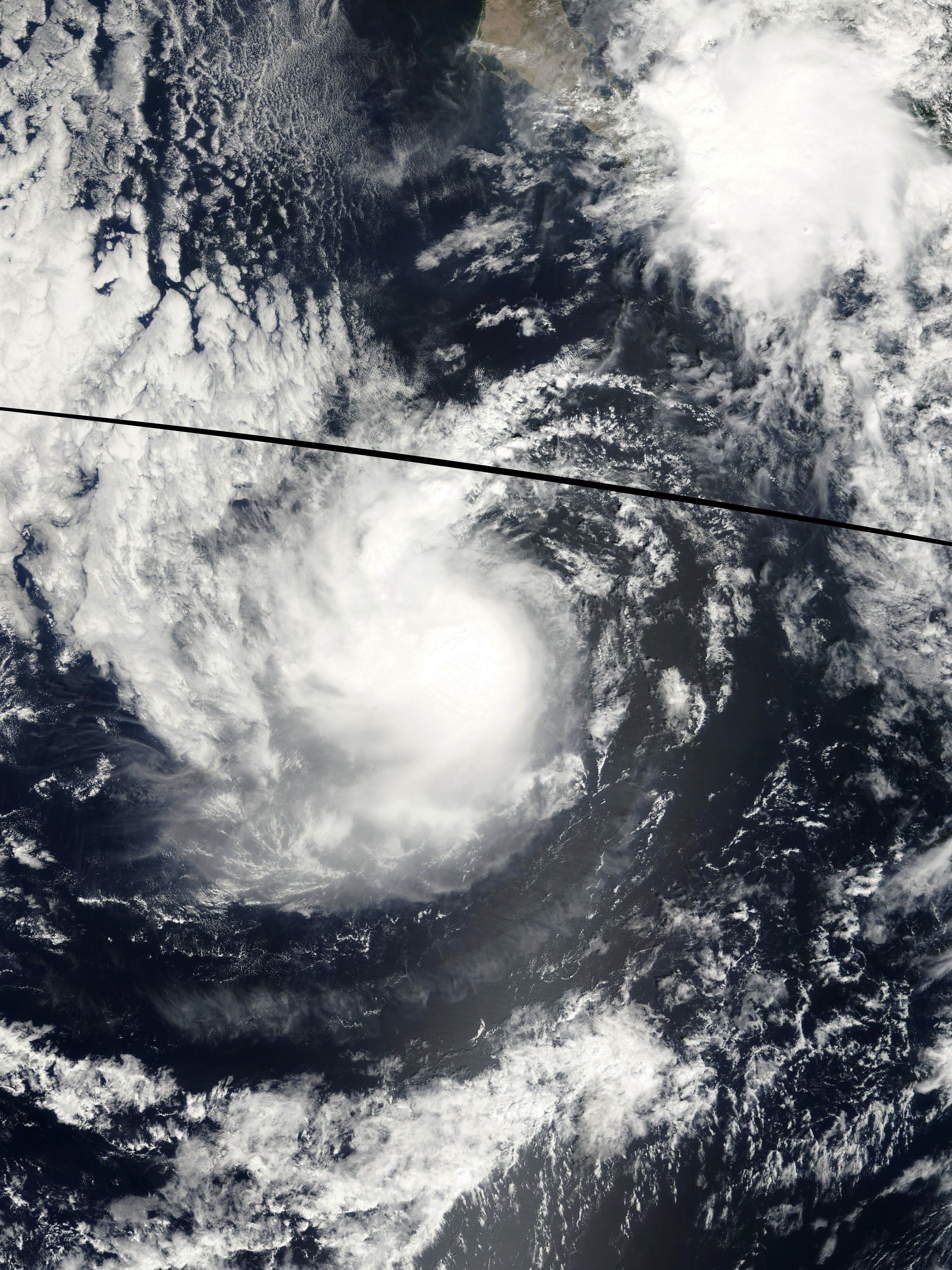
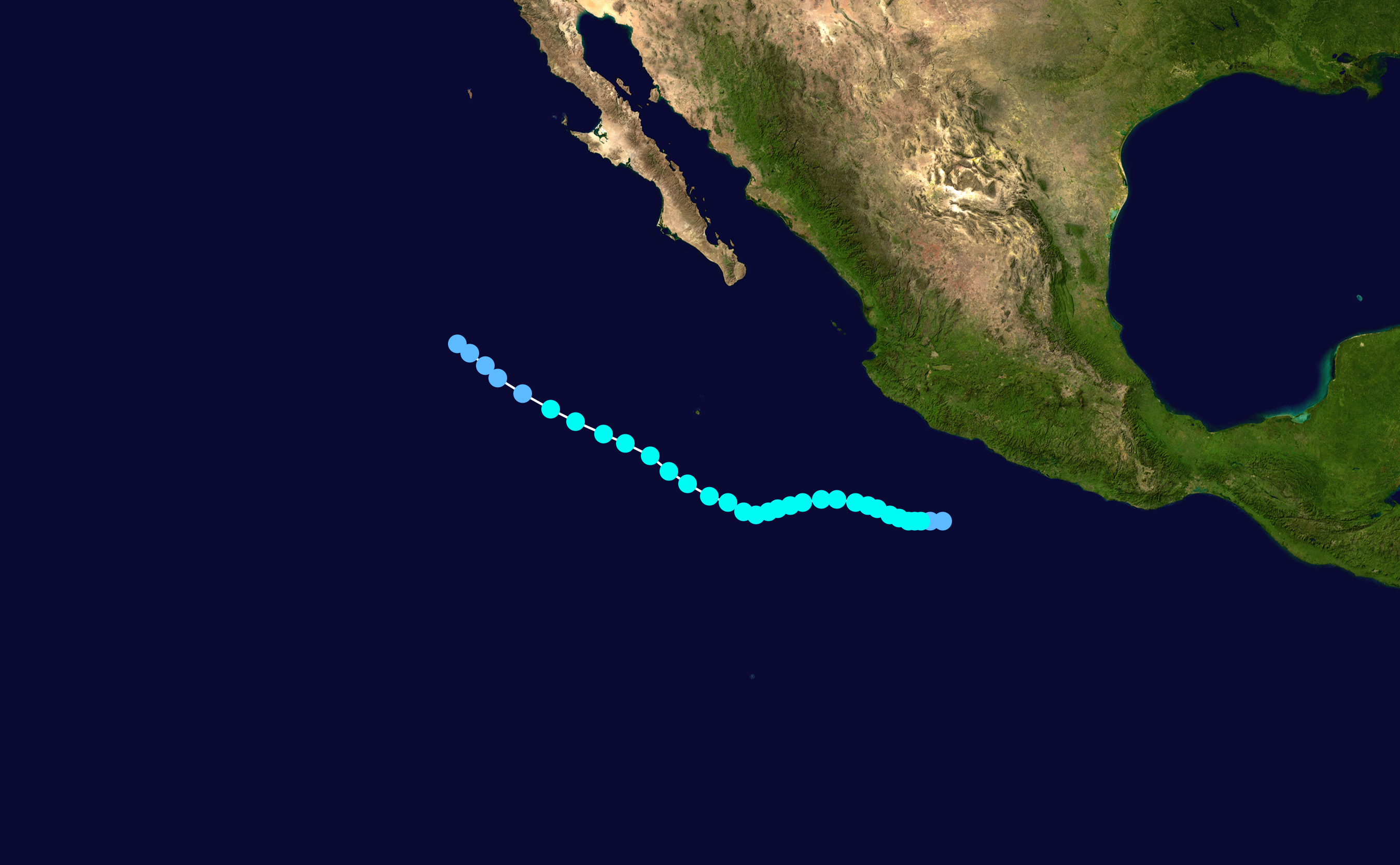
- Duration: October 2 – October 10
- Peak intensity: 65 mph (100 km/h) (1-min); 994 mbar (hPa)

A tropical wave left the African coast on September 16. Crossing into the East Pacific on September 28, the wave exhibited little thunderstorm activity until it developed a burst of deep convection late on September 30. After forming banding features, the system developed into Tropical Depression Seventeen-E at 12:00 UTC on October 2. It strengthened into Tropical Storm Olivia eighteen hours later. Moving west-northwestward away from Mexico, Olivia reached its peak intensity late on October 3 with 65 mph (100 km/h) winds, and a minimum pressure of 994 mbar (29.4 inHg). It maintained this intensity for 36 hours before an increase in wind shear caused by Atlantic Hurricane Keith caused it to weaken on October 5. After Keith made landfall on Mexico and dissipated, northeasterly shear relaxed, and allowed Olivia to re-strengthen and achieve peak winds again early on October 8. Continual westward movement brought the storm over cooler waters, and it began to weaken for a second time. Olivia dropped to tropical depression intensity early on October 9, and dissipated the next day.

Olivia's remnant low briefly re-gained convection on October 11, but increasing southwesterly shear disrupted it. The low crossed the Baja California Peninsula and the Gulf of California before moving across northwestern Mexico. On October 12, the remnant circulation moved through Cochise County, Arizona. The system interacted with an upper-level trough over Nevada to produce heavy rainfall in Arizona, peaking at 8.16 in (207 mm) in Hereford. The rains led to flooding across southern Arizona, causing US$30,000 in damage. Several roads were closed, leading to high water rescues in eastern Tucson. Two roads were damaged in Santa Cruz County. The floods also damaged crops and led to a few landslides.

=== Tropical Storm Paul ===
- Tropical storm (SSHWS)
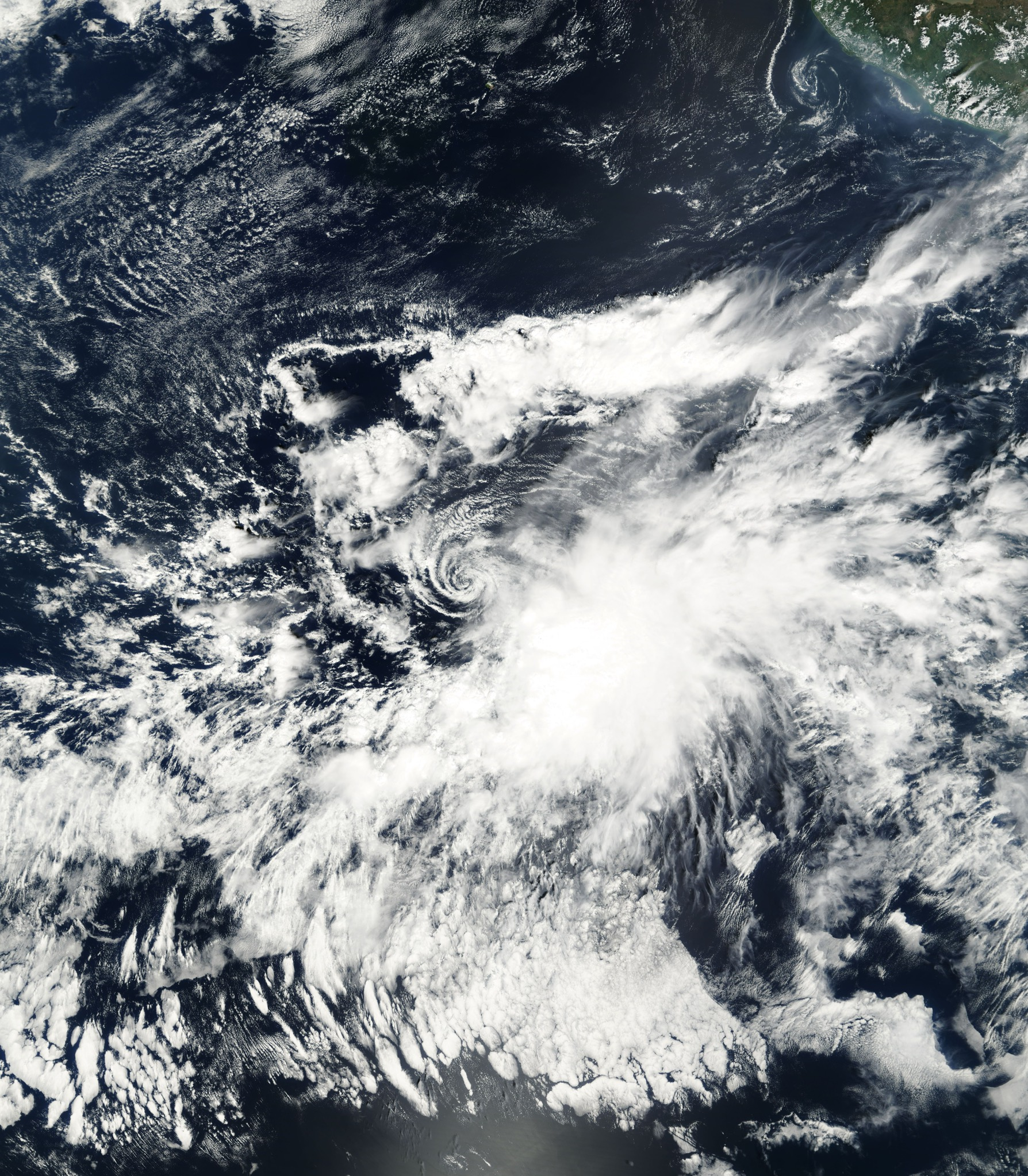
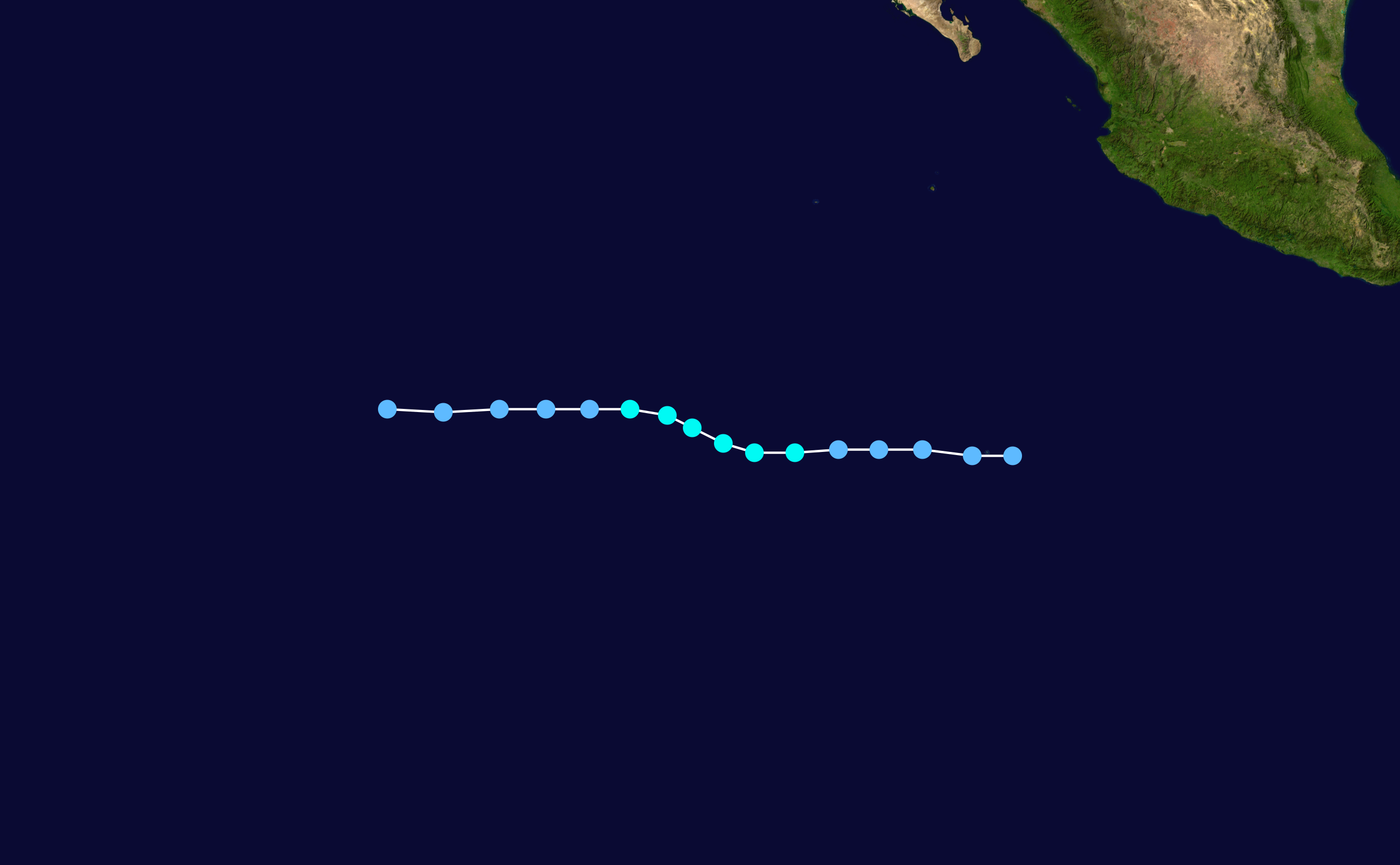
- Duration: October 25 – October 29
- Peak intensity: 45 mph (75 km/h) (1-min); 1003 mbar (hPa)

An area of disturbed weather emerged from the Intertropical Convergence Zone south of Mexico on October 22. Convection gradually organized and increased. On October 25, Tropical Depression 18-E formed to the south of the Baja California peninsula. It moved westward throughout its duration and intensified into Tropical Storm Paul on October 26. Paul soon attained peak winds of 45 mph (72 km/h). A trough briefly curved it to the northwest, before resuming its westward motion. As wind shear increased and convection became disorganized, Paul weakened. The thunderstorms became minimal, and Paul weakened to a tropical depression early on October 28. The circulation center deteriorated, and Paul dissipated early on October 29, as it was becoming indistinguishable in the ITCZ.

The remnants of Paul continued westward and interacted with an upper-level low, leading to thunderstorms that affected several Hawaiian islands. The highest precipitation was 38.97 in (990 mm) at Kapapala Ranch near Pāhala. This included 37.02 in (940 mm) measured over 24 hours from November 1–2, which was the highest 24 hour rainfall total for the island. Damage on the island of Hawaiʻi totaled $88.2 million, mostly related to infrastructure damage. The floods produced landslides and damaged seven bridges, including the only direct connection between Hilo and Pāhala. This led to a state of emergency and a presidential disaster declaration.

=== Tropical Storm Rosa ===
- Tropical storm (SSHWS)
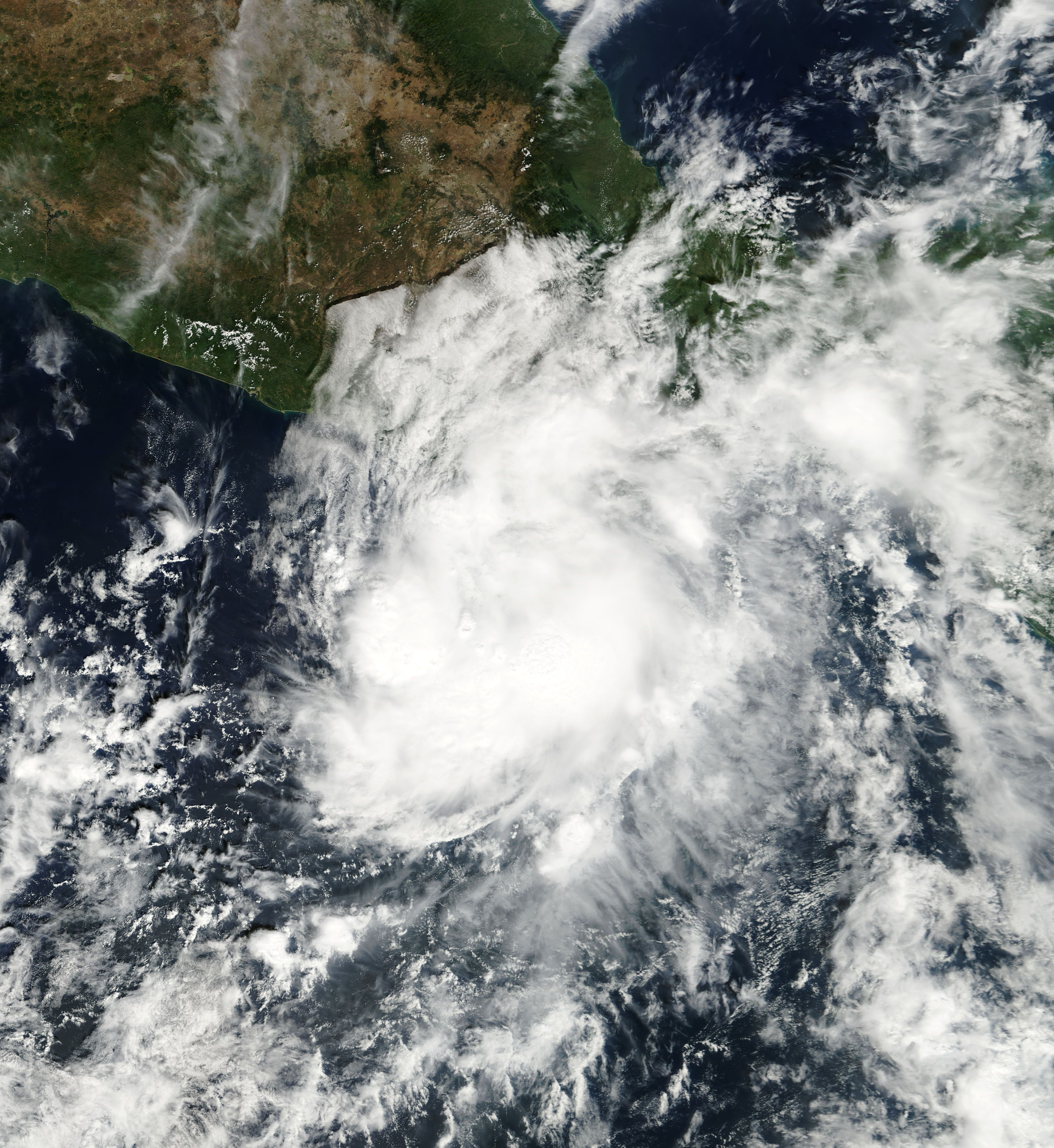
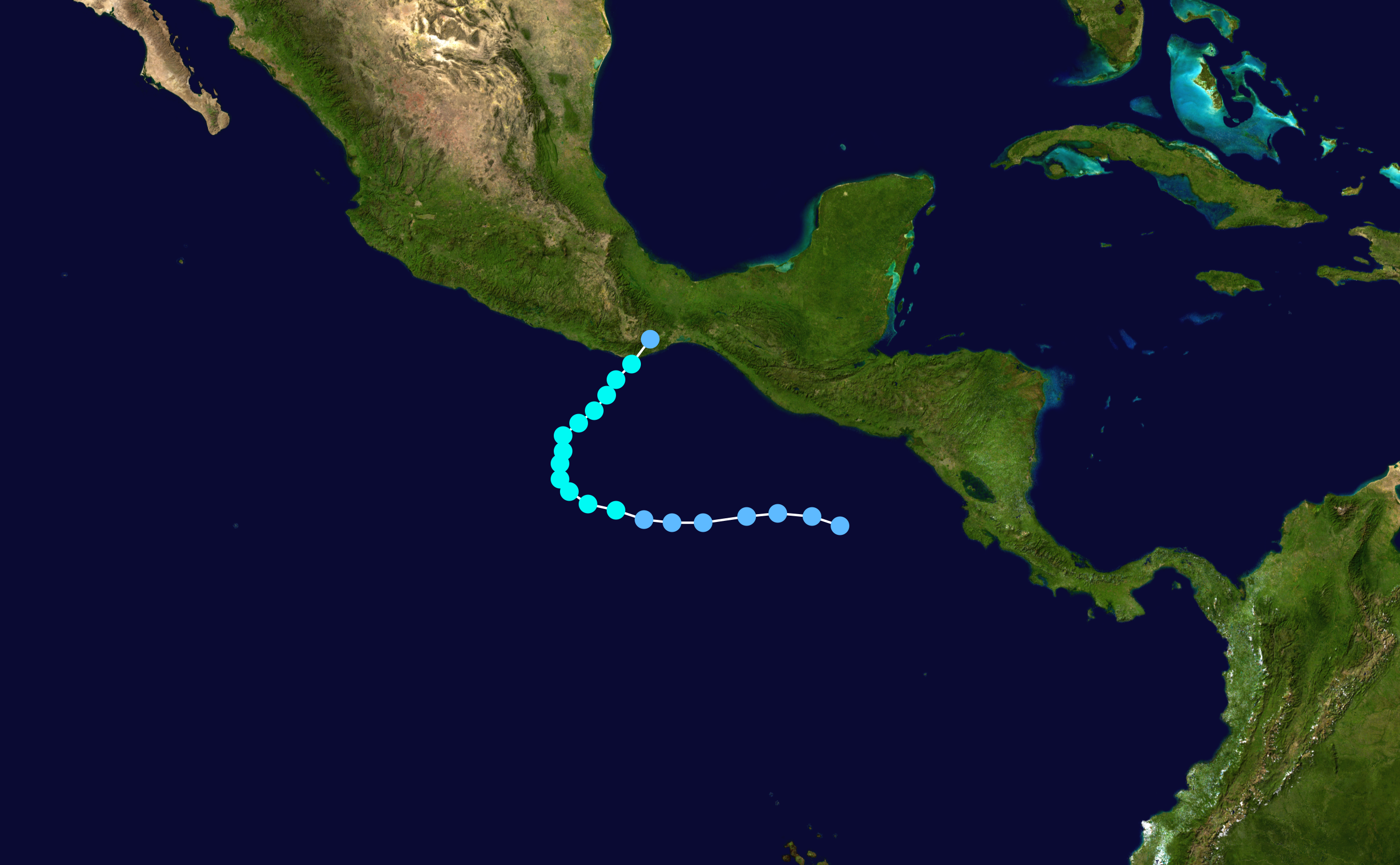
- Duration: November 3 – November 8
- Peak intensity: 65 mph (100 km/h) (1-min); 993 mbar (hPa)

A tropical wave moved off the coast of Africa on October 18. After crossing the Caribbean Sea, the wave entered the East Pacific Ocean on November 1. Amid favorable conditions, Tropical Depression Nineteen-E developed on November 3, while located 230 miles (370 km) south of the El Salvador–Guatemala border. The depression moved westward due to a ridge to the north. On November 5, the depression strengthened into Tropical Storm Rosa. A mid-level trough eroded the high-pressure system, allowing Rosa to turn more to the north. On November 6, the storm reached a peak of 65 mph (105 km/h). Soon after, Rosa weakened as it accelerated to the northeast. On November 8, the storm hit southern Mexico near Huatulco, Oaxaca, with winds of 40 mph (64 km/h). It quickly dissipated over land. Rosa dropped heavy rainfall in southeast Mexico, peaking at 15.32 inches (389 mm) near Unión Juárez, Chiapas. Damage in Oaxaca totaled US$15,000 (MX$140,000). Rosa was the first November storm since Hurricane Rick in the 1997 season.

== Storm names ==
The following list of names was used for named storms that formed in the North Pacific Ocean east of 140°W in 2000. This is the same list used in the 1994 season, as no names were retired from the list following that season. No names were retired from the list at the end of this season, so it was used again for the 2006 season. Named storms in the table that crossed into the Central Pacific are noted (*).

- Aletta
- Bud
- Carlotta
- Daniel *
- Emilia
- Fabio
- Gilma
- Hector
- Ileana
- John *
- Kristy
- Lane
- Miriam
- Norman
- Olivia
- Paul
- Rosa
- Sergio (unused)
- Tara (unused)
- Vicente (unused)
- Willa (unused)
- Xavier (unused)
- Yolanda (unused)
- Zeke (unused)

For storms that form in the North Pacific from 140°W to the International Date Line, the names come from a series of four rotating lists. Names are used one after the other without regard to year, and when the bottom of one list is reached, the next named storm receives the name at the top of the next list. Two named storms formed in the central North Pacific in 2000.

- Upana
- Wene

== Season effects ==
This is a table of all of the storms that formed in the 2000 Pacific hurricane season. It includes their name, duration, peak classification and intensities, areas affected, damage, and death totals. Damage and deaths include totals while the storm was extratropical, a wave, or a low, and all of the damage figures are in 2000 USD.

Saffir–Simpson scale
| TD | TS | C1 | C2 | C3 | C4 | C5 |

2000 Pacific hurricane season statistics
| Storm name | Dates active | Storm category at peak intensity | Max 1-min wind mph (km/h) | Min. press. (mbar) | Areas affected | Damage (US$) | Deaths | Ref(s). |
|---|---|---|---|---|---|---|---|---|
| Aletta | May 22 – 28 | Category 2 hurricane | 105 (165) | 970 | Southwestern Mexico | None | None | |
| Bud | June 13 – 17 | Tropical storm | 50 (85) | 994 | Revillagigedo Islands, Baja California Peninsula | Minimal | None | |
| Carlotta | June 18 – 25 | Category 4 hurricane | 155 (250) | 932 | Southwestern Mexico, Northwestern Mexico | Minimal | 18 | |
| Four-E | July 6 – 7 | Tropical depression | 30 (45) | 1007 | None | None | None | |
| Upana | July 20 – 24 | Tropical storm | 45 (75) | 1006 | None | None | None | |
| Five-E | July 22 – 23 | Tropical depression | 35 (55) | 1005 | None | None | None | |
| Daniel | July 23 – August 5 | Category 3 hurricane | 125 (205) | 954 | Hawaiian Islands, Aleutian Islands | None | None | |
| Emilia | July 26 – 30 | Tropical storm | 65 (100) | 994 | Clarion Island, Revillagigedo Islands | None | None | |
| Fabio | August 3 – 8 | Tropical storm | 50 (85) | 1000 | None | None | None | |
| Gilma | August 5 – 11 | Category 1 hurricane | 80 (130) | 984 | None | None | None | |
| Hector | August 10 – 16 | Category 1 hurricane | 80 (130) | 983 | None | None | None | |
| Ileana | August 13 – 17 | Tropical storm | 70 (110) | 991 | Baja California Peninsula, Northwestern Mexico | None | None | |
| Wene | August 15 – 17 | Tropical storm | 50 (85) | 1002 | None (after crossover) | None | None | |
| John | August 28 – September 1 | Tropical storm | 70 (110) | 994 | None | None | None | |
| Kristy | August 31 – September 3 | Tropical storm | 40 (65) | 1004 | None | None | None | |
| Lane | September 5 – 14 | Category 2 hurricane | 100 (155) | 967 | Socorro Island, Baja California Peninsula, Southwestern United States | Minimal | None | |
| Miriam | September 15 – 17 | Tropical storm | 40 (65) | 1004 | Northwestern Mexico | $22,000 | None | |
| Norman | September 20 – 22 | Tropical storm | 50 (85) | 998 | Southwestern Mexico, Arizona, Texas | $18.8 million | 9 | |
| Olivia | October 2 – 10 | Tropical storm | 65 (100) | 994 | Southwestern United States | $30,000 | None | |
| Paul | October 25 – 29 | Tropical storm | 45 (75) | 1003 | Hawaii | $88.2 million | None | |
| Rosa | November 3 – 8 | Tropical storm | 65 (100) | 993 | Southwestern Mexico, Central America | $15,000 | None | |
Season aggregates
| 21 systems | May 22 – November 8 | | 155 (250) | 932 | | $84.3 million | 27 | |

== See also ==
- Pacific hurricane
- List of Pacific hurricanes
- 2000 Atlantic hurricane season
- 2000 Pacific typhoon season
- 2000 North Indian Ocean cyclone season
- South-West Indian Ocean cyclone seasons: 1999–2000, 2000–01
- Australian region cyclone seasons: 1999–2000, 2000–01
- South Pacific cyclone seasons: 1999–2000, 2000–01
