= Timeline of the 2000 Pacific hurricane season =

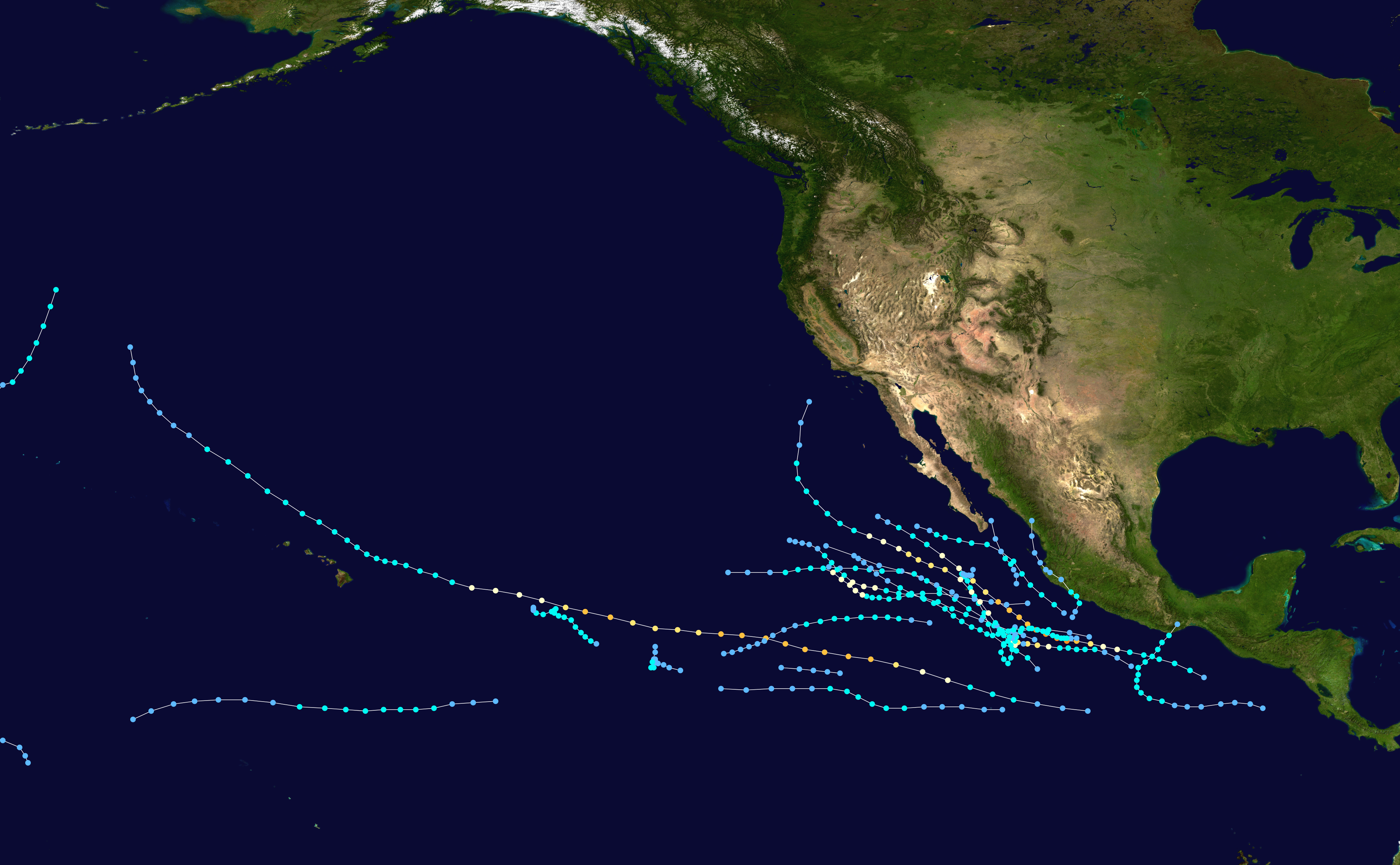
- Season summary map

Season boundaries
- First system formed: May 22, 2000
- Last system dissipated: November 8, 2000

Strongest system
- Name: Carlotta
- Maximum winds: 155 mph (250 km/h)
- Lowest pressure: 932 mbar (hPa; 27.52 inHg)

Longest lasting system
- Name: Daniel
- Duration: 13.5 days
Storm articles
- November 2000 Hawaii floods (Tropical Storm Paul)

The 2000 Pacific hurricane season was the annual cycle of tropical cyclone formation over the Pacific Ocean north of the equator and east of the International Date Line (IDL). The season officially began on May 15 in the Eastern Pacific proper (east of 140°W) and June 1 in the Central Pacific (140°W to the IDL), and ended on November 30 in both areas. This is historically the period during which most tropical cyclogenesis occurs in these respective areas. The season's first system, Hurricane Aletta, developed on May 22; its last, Tropical Storm Rosa, dissipated on November 8.

The season generated nineteen nameable tropical storms, an above-average number. (Note: During the period from 1991 to 2020, an average Pacific hurricane season generated fifteen tropical storms, eight hurricanes, and four major hurricanes.) However, most storms were weak, and the numbers of hurricanes and major hurricanes—Category 3 or higher on the five-level Saffir–Simpson scale—were both below average. Two tropical storms, Upana and Wene, formed in the Central Pacific; two more, Hurricane Daniel and Tropical Storm John, entered the region from the Eastern Pacific. Two tropical depressions formed that did not reach tropical storm strength.

Several storms affected land this season. Tropical storms Norman and Rosa made direct landfalls on the Mexican coast, the former killing nine people by flooding. The remnants of Tropical Storm Paul contributed to significant flash floods in Hawaii. Though it did not directly impact land, Hurricane Carlotta killed eighteen people when it sank the Lithuanian freighter MV Linkuva off the coast of Mexico with the loss of her crew.

This timeline documents tropical cyclone formations, strengthening, weakening, landfalls, and dissipations during the season. It includes information that was not released during the season, meaning that data from post-storm reviews by the National Hurricane Center (NHC) and the Central Pacific Hurricane Center (CPHC) has been included.

The time stamp for each event is first stated using Coordinated Universal Time (UTC), the 24-hour clock where 00:00 = midnight UTC. The NHC uses both UTC and the time zone where the center of the tropical cyclone was then located. Prior to 2015, two time zones were utilized in the Eastern Pacific basin: Pacific for the Eastern Pacific, and Hawaii−Aleutian for the Central Pacific. In this timeline, the respective area time is included in parentheses. Additionally, figures for maximum sustained winds and position estimates are rounded to the nearest 5 units (miles, or kilometers), following NHC practice. Direct wind observations are rounded to the nearest whole number. Atmospheric pressures are listed to the nearest millibar and nearest hundredth of an inch of mercury.

== Timeline of events ==
=== May ===
May 15

- The 2000 Eastern Pacific hurricane season officially begins.

May 22

- 12:00 UTC (5:00 a.m. PDT) at 13.3°N 99.2°W – Tropical Depression One-E forms from a tropical wave about 245 mi (400 km) south of Acapulco, Guerrero.

May 23

- 06:00 UTC (11:00 p.m. PDT, May 22) at 14.5°N 101.8°W – Tropical Depression One-E strengthens into Tropical Storm Aletta about 220 mi (350 km) south of Zihuatanejo, Guerrero.

May 24

- 12:00 UTC (5:00 a.m. PDT) at 14.7°N 105.1°W – Tropical Storm Aletta strengthens into a Category 1 hurricane on the Saffir–Simpson scale about 310 mi (500 km) southwest of Zihuatanejo.
- 18:00 UTC (11:00 a.m. PDT) at 14.8°N 105.9°W – Hurricane Aletta strengthens to Category 2 intensity about 350 mi (565 km) southwest of Zihuatanejo.

May 25

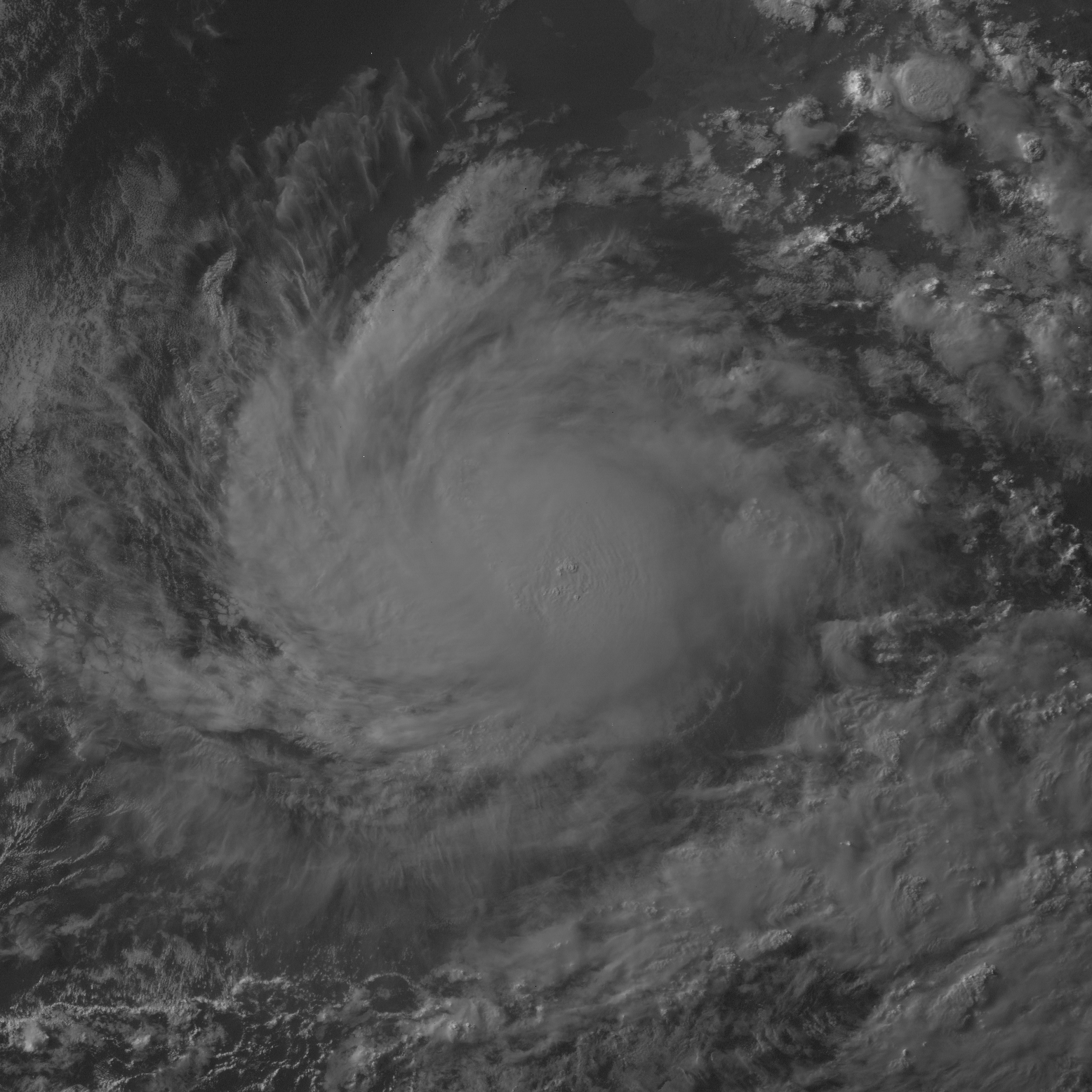
Hurricane Aletta at peak intensity early on May 25

- 00:00 UTC (5:00 p.m. PDT, May 24) at 14.9°N 106.6°W – Hurricane Aletta attains its peak intensity, with maximum sustained winds of 105 mph (165 km/h) and a minimum central pressure of 970 mbar (28.64 inHg), about 385 mi (620 km) west-southwest of Zihuatanejo.

May 26

- 00:00 UTC (5:00 p.m. PDT, May 25) at 14.8°N 107.7°W – Hurricane Aletta weakens to Category 1 intensity about 455 mi (730 km) west-southwest of Zihuatanejo.

May 27

- 00:00 UTC (5:00 p.m. PDT, May 26) at 14.8°N 107.8°W – Hurricane Aletta weakens into a tropical storm about 460 mi (740 km) west-southwest of Zihuatanejo.
- 18:00 UTC (11:00 a.m. PDT) at 15.6°N 107.5°W – Tropical Storm Aletta weakens into a tropical depression about 420 mi (675 km) west-southwest of Zihuatanejo, or about 530 mi (850 km) south-southeast of Cabo San Lucas, Baja California Sur.

May 28

- 00:00 UTC (5:00 p.m. PDT, May 27) at 16.1°N 107.5°W – Tropical Depression Aletta is last noted as a tropical cyclone about 495 mi (795 km) south-southeast of Cabo San Lucas, dissipating shortly thereafter.

=== June ===
June 1

- The 2000 Central Pacific hurricane season officially begins.

June 13

- 06:00 UTC (11:00 p.m. PDT, June 12) at 13.1°N 105.9°W – Tropical Depression Two-E forms from a tropical wave about 425 mi (685 km) south-southwest of Manzanillo, Colima.
- 12:00 UTC (5:00 a.m. PDT) at 13.9°N 106.6°W – Tropical Depression Two-E strengthens into Tropical Storm Bud about 385 mi (620 km) south-southwest of Manzanillo.

June 14

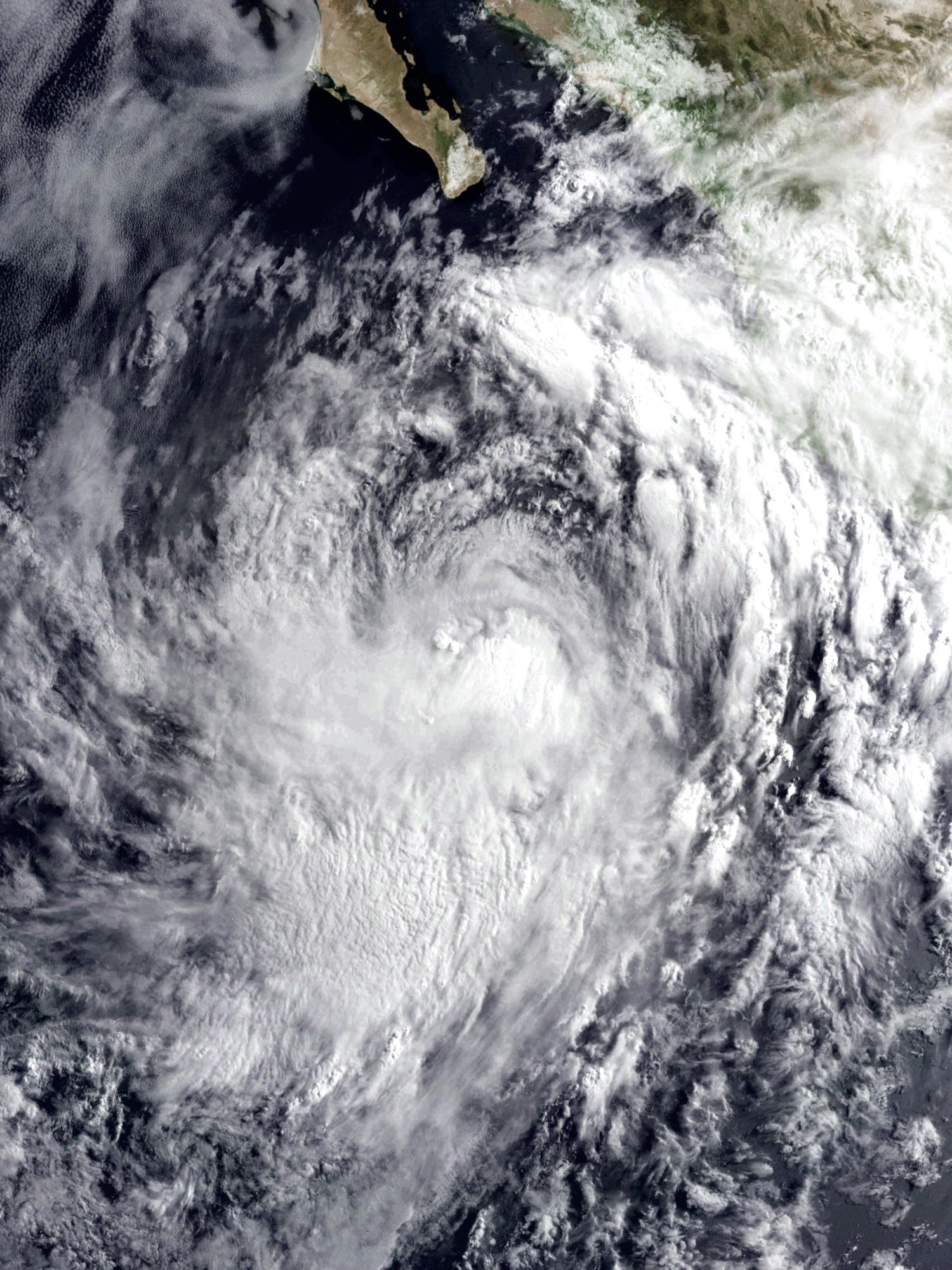
Tropical Storm Bud near peak intensity on June 14

- 06:00 UTC (11:00 p.m. PDT, June 13) at 15.5°N 109.1°W – Tropical Storm Bud attains its peak intensity, with maximum sustained winds of 50 mph (85 km/h) and a minimum central pressure of 994 mbar (29.35 inHg), about 260 mi (415 km) south-southeast of Socorro Island.

June 16

- 12:00 UTC (5:00 a.m. PDT) at 19.9°N 111.2°W – Tropical Storm Bud weakens into a tropical depression about 80 mi (130 km) north of Socorro Island.

June 17

- 12:00 UTC (5:00 a.m. PDT) at 20.2°N 110.5°W – Tropical Depression Bud is last noted as a tropical cyclone about 105 mi (165 km) north-northeast of Socorro Island, degenerating into a remnant low shortly thereafter.

June 18

- 18:00 UTC (11:00 a.m. PDT) at 12.5°N 94.0°W – Tropical Depression Three-E forms from a tropical wave about 275 mi (445 km) southeast of Puerto Ángel, Oaxaca.

June 19

- 00:00 UTC (5:00 p.m. PDT, June 18) at 13.0°N 95.0°W – Tropical Depression Three-E strengthens into Tropical Storm Carlotta about 205 mi (335 km) south-southeast of Puerto Ángel.

June 20

- 06:00 UTC (11:00 p.m. PDT, June 19) at 14.5°N 100.2°W – Tropical Storm Carlotta strengthens into a Category 1 hurricane about 165 mi (270 km) south of Acapulco.
- 18:00 UTC (11:00 a.m. PDT) at 14.9°N 102.1°W – Hurricane Carlotta strengthens to Category 2 intensity about 200 mi (325 km) southeast of Acapulco.

June 21

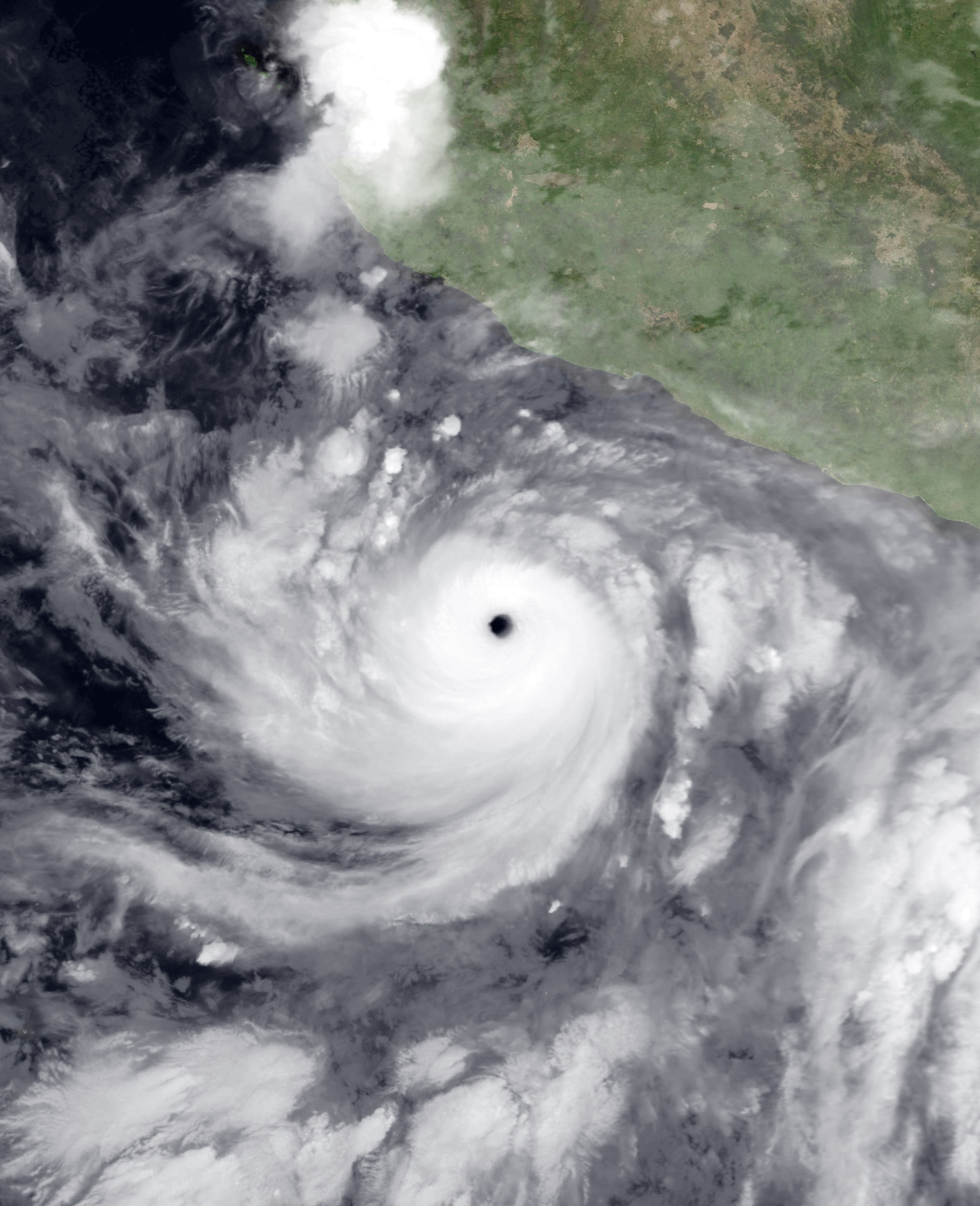
Hurricane Carlotta near peak intensity early on June 21

- 00:00 UTC (5:00 p.m. PDT, June 20) at 15.1°N 103.1°W – Hurricane Carlotta strengthens to Category 3 intensity about 245 mi (400 km) west-southwest of Acapulco.
- 06:00 UTC (11:00 p.m. PDT, June 20) at 15.1°N 103.8°W – Hurricane Carlotta strengthens to Category 4 intensity about 290 mi (465 km) west-southwest of Acapulco. It simultaneously attains its peak intensity, with maximum sustained winds of 155 mph (250 km/h) and a minimum central pressure of 932 mbar (27.52 inHg), making it the strongest storm of the season.

June 22

- 06:00 UTC (11:00 p.m. PDT, June 21) at 16.3°N 106.6°W – Hurricane Carlotta weakens to Category 3 intensity about 450 mi (720 km) west of Acapulco.

June 23

- 06:00 UTC (11:00 p.m. PDT, June 22) at 18.6°N 109.6°W – Hurricane Carlotta weakens to Category 2 intensity about 295 mi (470 km) south of Cabo San Lucas.
- 18:00 UTC (11:00 a.m. PDT) at 20.3°N 111.5°W – Hurricane Carlotta weakens to Category 1 intensity about 200 mi (325 km) south-southwest of Cabo San Lucas.

June 24

- 06:00 UTC (11:00 p.m. PDT, June 23) at 22.0°N 113.8°W – Hurricane Carlotta weakens into a tropical storm about 255 mi (405 km) west-southwest of Cabo San Lucas.

June 25

- 00:00 UTC (5:00 p.m. PDT, June 24) at 23.6°N 116.6°W – Tropical Storm Carlotta weakens into a tropical depression about 425 mi (685 km)
- 06:00 UTC (11:00 p.m. PDT, June 24) at 24.0°N 117.3°W – Tropical Depression Carlotta is last noted as a tropical cyclone about 470 mi (760 km) west of Cabo San Lucas, dissipating shortly thereafter.

=== July ===
July 6

- 12:00 UTC (5:00 a.m. PDT) at 12.8°N 120.0°W – Tropical Depression Four-E forms from a tropical wave about 960 mi (1,545 km) southwest of Cabo San Lucas. It is already at its peak intensity, with maximum sustained winds of 30 mph (45 km/h) and a minimum central pressure of 1007 mbar (29.74 inHg).

July 7

- 12:00 UTC (5:00 a.m. PDT) at 13.2°N 124.2°W – Tropical Depression Four-E is last noted as a tropical cyclone about 1,145 mi (1,845 km) southwest of Cabo San Lucas, dissipating shortly thereafter.

July 20

- 00:00 UTC (2:00 p.m. HST, July 19) at 10.8°N 144.6°W – Tropical Depression One-C forms from an area of disturbed weather about 910 mi (1,465 km) southeast of Cape Kumukahi Light.
- 18:00 UTC (8:00 a.m. HST) at 10.3°N 149.0°W – Tropical Depression One-C strengthens into Tropical Storm Upana about 740 mi (1,195 km) southeast of Ka Lae.

July 21

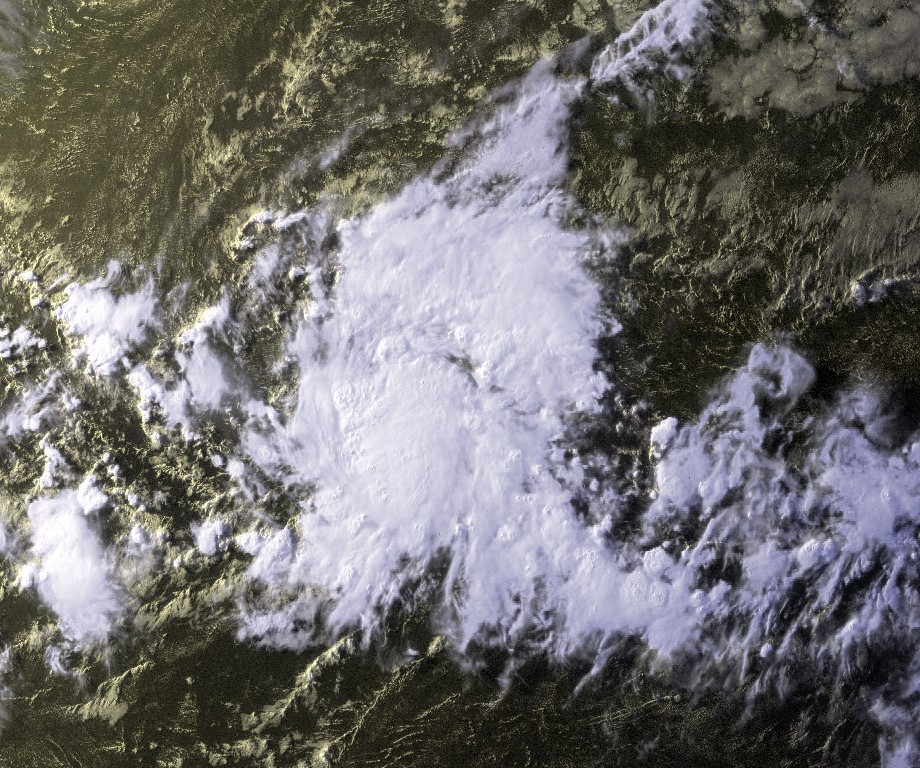
Tropical Storm Upana at peak intensity early on July 21

- 06:00 UTC (8:00 p.m. HST, July 20) at 10.2°N 151.4°W – Tropical Storm Upana attains its peak intensity, with maximum sustained winds of 45 mph (75 km/h) and an unknown minimum central pressure, about 665 mi (1,075 km) south-southeast of Ka Lae.

July 22

- 00:00 UTC (5:00 p.m. PDT, July 21) at 18.6°N 112.0°W – Tropical Depression Five-E forms from a tropical wave about 70 mi (110 km) west of Socorro Island.
- 18:00 UTC (8:00 a.m. HST) at 10.7°N 160.5°W – Tropical Storm Upana weakens into a tropical depression about 650 mi (1,045 km) south-southwest of Ka Lae.
- 18:00 UTC (11:00 a.m. PDT) at 20.1°N 115.6°W – Tropical Depression Five-E attains its peak intensity, with maximum sustained winds of 35 mph (55 km/h) and a minimum central pressure of 1,005 mbar (29.68 inHg), about 315 mi (510 km) west-northwest of Socorro Island.

July 23

- 00:00 UTC (5:00 p.m. PDT, July 22) at 10.1°N 102.3°W – Tropical Depression Six-E forms from a tropical wave about 635 mi (1,020 km) south-southeast of Manzanillo.
- 12:00 UTC (5:00 a.m. PDT) at 21.9°N 121.0°W – Tropical Depression Five-E is last noted as a tropical cyclone about 685 mi (1,100 km) west-northwest of Socorro Island, dissipating shortly thereafter.
- 18:00 UTC (11:00 a.m. PDT) at 10.9°N 107.6°W – Tropical Depression Six-E strengthens into Tropical Storm Daniel about 605 mi (970 km) south-southwest of Manzanillo.

July 24

- 00:00 UTC (2:00 p.m. HST, July 23) at 10.1°N 169.2°W – Tropical Depression Upana is last noted as a tropical cyclone about 460 mi (740 km) south of Johnston Atoll, dissipating shortly thereafter.
- 12:00 UTC (5:00 a.m. PDT) at 12.3°N 112.3°W – Tropical Storm Daniel strengthens into a Category 1 hurricane about 710 mi (1,140 km) southwest of Manzanillo.

July 25

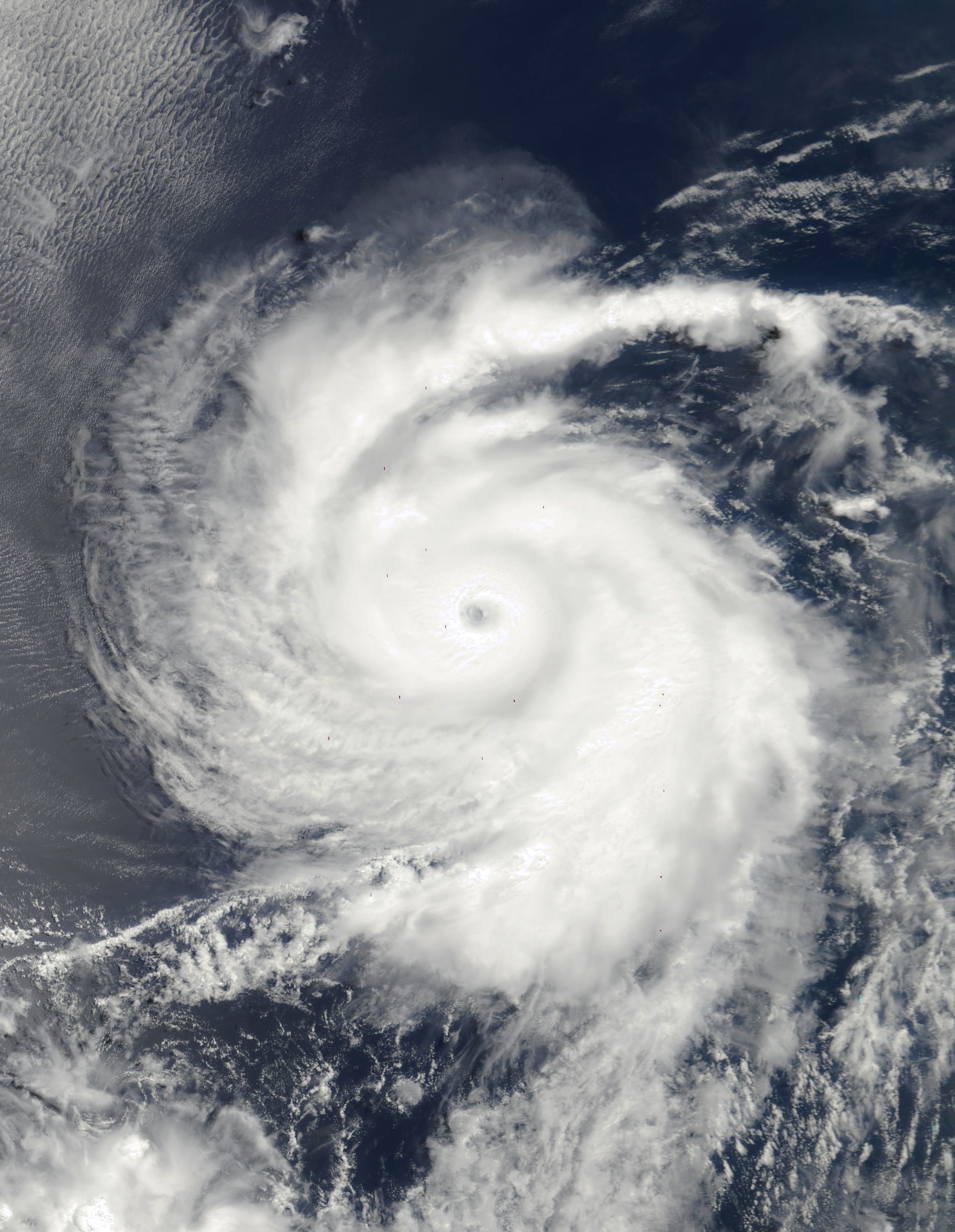
Hurricane Daniel at peak intensity late on July 25

- 00:00 UTC (5:00 p.m. PDT, July 24) at 13.4°N 116.0°W – Hurricane Daniel strengthens to Category 2 intensity about 765 mi (1,230 km) south-southwest of Cabo San Lucas.
- 06:00 UTC (11:00 p.m. PDT, July 24) at 13.8°N 117.8°W – Hurricane Daniel strengthens to Category 3 intensity about 810 mi (1,305 km) southwest of Cabo San Lucas.
- 18:00 UTC (11:00 a.m. PDT) at 14.3°N 121.1°W – Hurricane Daniel attains its peak intensity, with maximum sustained winds of 125 mph (205 km/h) and a minimum central pressure of 954 mbar (28.17 inHg), about 940 mi (1,510 km) southwest of Cabo San Lucas.

July 26

- 06:00 UTC (11:00 p.m. PDT, July 25) at 14.9°N 106.9°W – Tropical Depression Seven-E forms from a tropical wave about 335 mi (535 km) south-southwest of Manzanillo.
- 18:00 UTC (11:00 a.m. PDT) at 15.8°N 108.4°W – Tropical Depression Seven-E strengthens into Tropical Storm Emilia about 350 mi (565 km) southwest of Manzanillo.

July 27

- 06:00 UTC (11:00 p.m. PDT, July 26) at 15.7°N 130.1°W – Hurricane Daniel weakens to Category 2 intensity about 1,405 mi (2,260 km) west-southwest of Cabo San Lucas.
- 18:00 UTC (11:00 a.m. PDT) at 18.1°N 111.8°W – Tropical Storm Emilia attains its peak intensity, with maximum sustained winds of 65 mph (100 km/h) and a minimum central pressure of 994 mbar (29.35 inHg), about 70 mi (110 km) west of Socorro Island.

July 28

- 06:00 UTC (11:00 p.m. PDT, July 27) at 16.8°N 136.4°W – Hurricane Daniel restrengthens to Category 3 intensity about 1,765 mi (2,845 km) west-southwest of Cabo San Lucas.
- 18:00 UTC (11:00 a.m. PDT) at 17.5°N 139.6°W – Hurricane Daniel weakens back to Category 2 intensity about 1,950 mi (3,140 km) west of Cabo San Lucas.

July 29

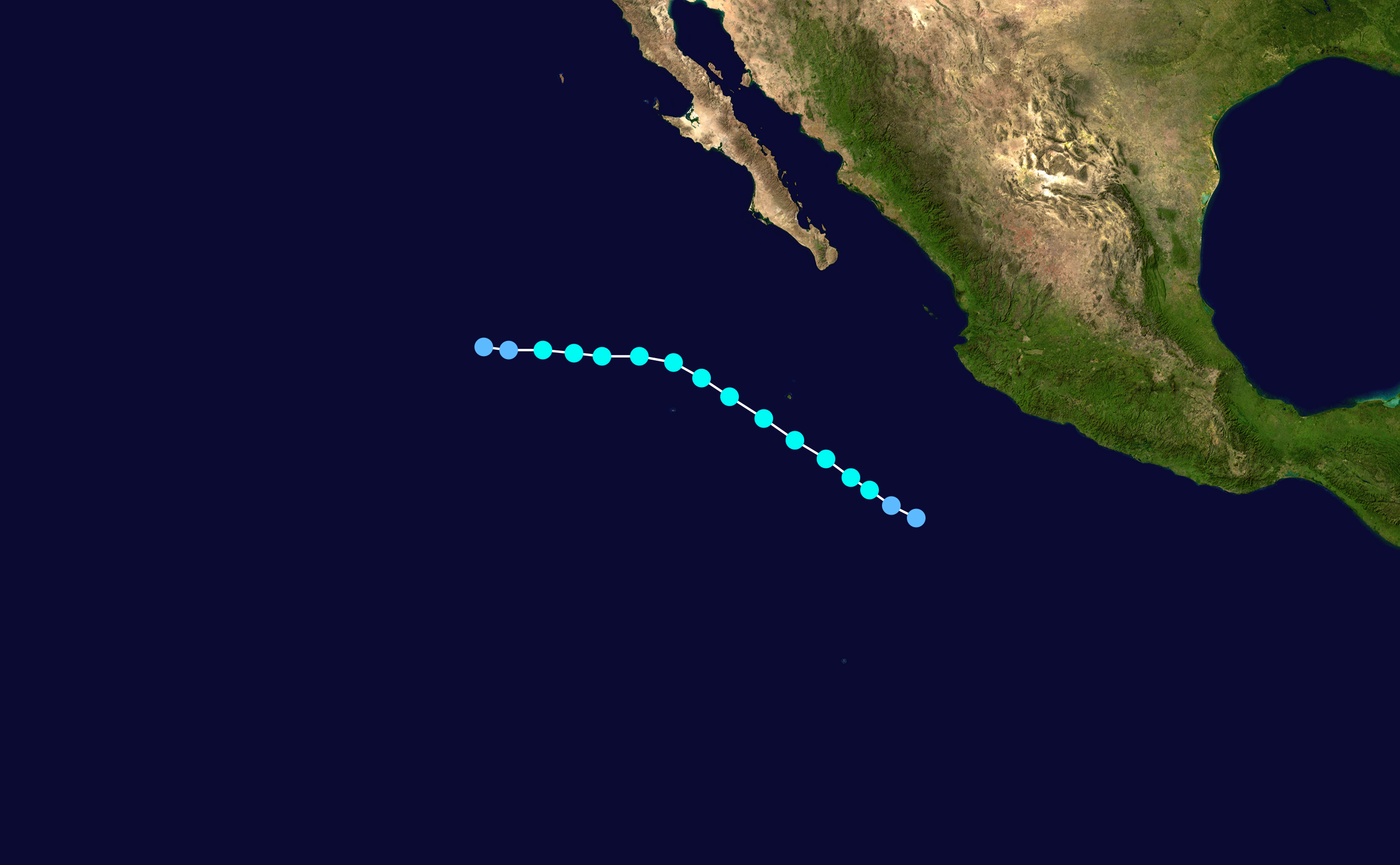
Storm path of Tropical Storm Emilia

- 00:00 UTC (2:00 p.m. HST, July 28) at 18.0°N 141.3°W – Hurricane Daniel weakens to Category 1 intensity about 890 mi (1,435 km) east of Cape Kumukahi Light, as it crosses 140°W into the Central Pacific basin.
- 18:00 UTC (11:00 a.m. PDT) at 20.3°N 120.0°W – Tropical Storm Emilia weakens into a tropical depression about 600 mi (965 km) west of Socorro Island.

July 30

- 00:00 UTC (2:00 p.m. HST, July 29) at 19.3°N 147.7°W – Hurricane Daniel weakens into a tropical storm about 465 mi (750 km) east of Cape Kumukahi Light.
- 00:00 UTC (5:00 p.m. PDT, July 29) at 20.4°N 120.8°W – Tropical Depression Emilia is last noted as a tropical cyclone about 650 mi (1,045 km) west of Socorro Island, or about 715 mi (1,150 km) west-southwest of Cabo San Lucas, dissipating shortly thereafter.

=== August ===
August 3

- 12:00 UTC (2:00 a.m. HST) at 29.8°N 166.5°W – Tropical Storm Daniel weakens into a tropical depression about 675 mi (1,085 km) northeast of Niʻihau.
- 12:00 UTC (5:00 a.m. PDT) at 16.4°N 113.6°W – Tropical Depression Eight-E forms from a tropical wave about 640 mi (1,030 km) west-southwest of Manzanillo.

August 4

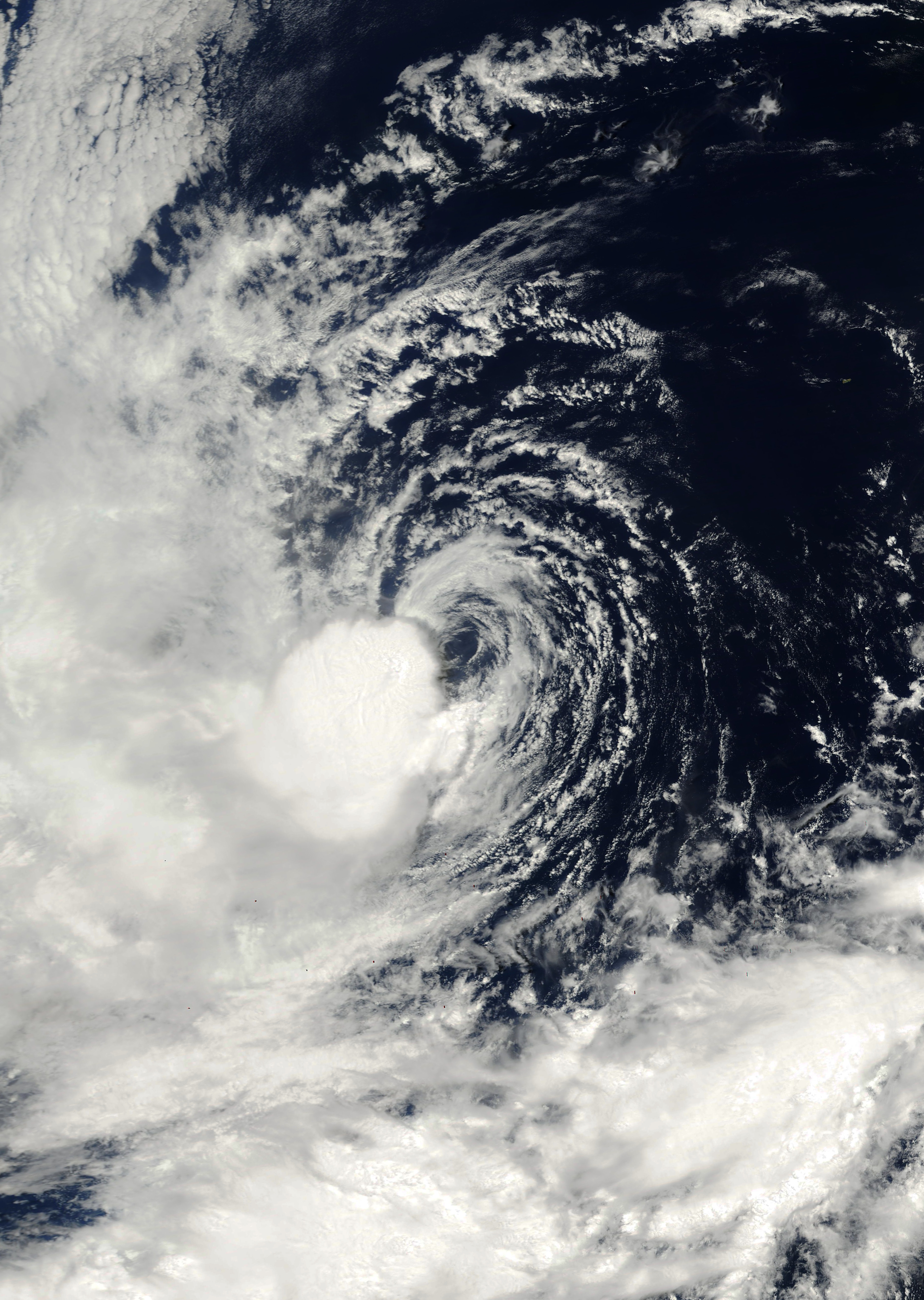
Tropical Storm Fabio near peak intensity on August 4

- 00:00 UTC (5:00 p.m. PDT, August 3) at 16.7°N 115.8°W – Tropical Depression Eight-E strengthens into Tropical Storm Fabio about 570 mi (915 km) southwest of Cabo San Lucas.
- 12:00 UTC (5:00 a.m. PDT) at 16.8°N 117.5°W – Tropical Storm Fabio attains its peak intensity, with maximum sustained winds of 50 mph (85 km/h) and a minimum central pressure of 1000 mbar (29.53 inHg), about 645 mi (1,035 km) southwest of Cabo San Lucas.

August 5

- 00:00 UTC (5:00 p.m. PDT, August 4) at 15.0°N 105.2°W – Tropical Depression Nine-E forms from a tropical wave about 290 mi (465 km) south of Manzanillo.
- 06:00 UTC (8:00 p.m. HST, August 4) at 36.1°N 170.7°W – Tropical Depression Daniel is last noted as a tropical cyclone about 1,170 mi (1,880 km) northwest of Niʻihau, dissipating shortly thereafter.

August 6

- 00:00 UTC (5:00 p.m. PDT, August 5) at 16.2°N 123.2°W – Tropical Storm Fabio weakens into a tropical depression about 980 mi (1,575 km) west-southwest of Cabo San Lucas.
- 12:00 UTC (5:00 a.m. PDT) at 17.0°N 111.0°W – Tropical Depression Nine-E strengthens into Tropical Storm Gilma about 410 mi (655 km) south of Cabo San Lucas.

August 8

- 00:00 UTC (5:00 p.m. PDT, August 7) at 14.2°N 128.3°W – Tropical Depression Fabio is last noted as a tropical cyclone about 1,340 mi (2,160 km) west-southwest of Cabo San Lucas, dissipating shortly thereafter.
- 06:00 UTC (11:00 p.m. PDT, August 7) at 18.9°N 117.5°W – Tropical Storm Gilma strengthens into a Category 1 hurricane about 560 mi (900 km) west-southwest of Cabo San Lucas.
- 12:00 UTC (5:00 a.m. PDT) at 19.0°N 118.3°W – Hurricane Gilma attains its peak intensity, with maximum sustained winds of 80 mph (130 km/h) and a minimum central pressure of 984 mbar (29.06 inHg), about 600 mi (965 km) west-southwest of Cabo San Lucas.

August 9

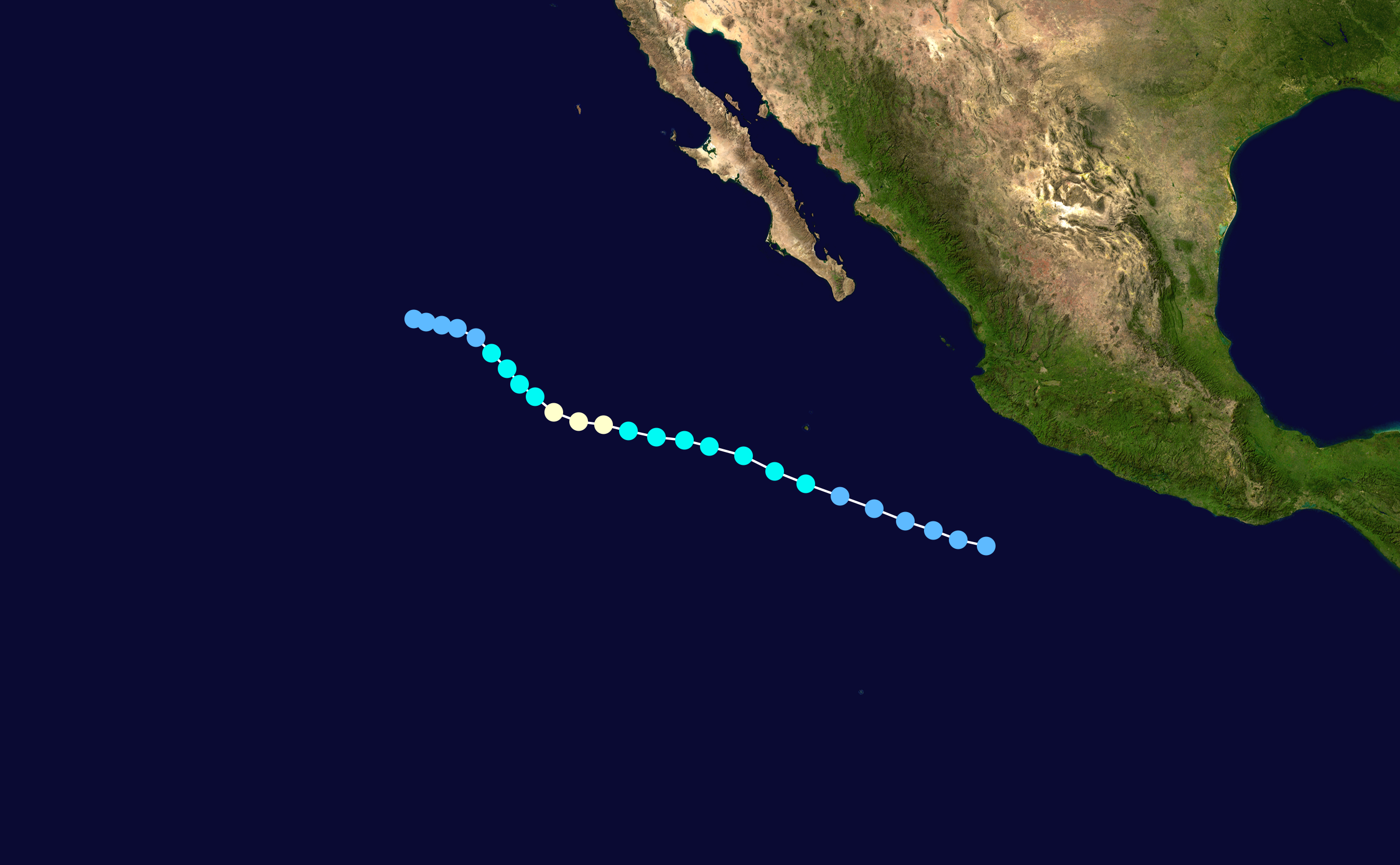
Storm path of Hurricane Gilma

- 00:00 UTC (5:00 p.m. PDT, August 8) at 19.8°N 119.7°W – Hurricane Gilma weakens into a tropical storm about 660 mi (1,065 km) west-southwest of Cabo San Lucas.

August 10

- 00:00 UTC (5:00 p.m. PDT, August 9) at 21.7°N 121.6°W – Tropical Storm Gilma weakens into a tropical depression about 750 mi (1,205 km) west of Cabo San Lucas.
- 18:00 UTC (11:00 a.m. PDT) at 17.8°N 106.6°W – Tropical Depression Ten-E forms from a tropical wave about 175 mi (280 km) west-southwest of Manzanillo.

August 11

- 00:00 UTC (5:00 p.m. PDT, August 10) at 22.3°N 123.6°W – Tropical Depression Gilma is last noted as a tropical cyclone about 870 mi (1,400 km) west of Cabo San Lucas, dissipating shortly thereafter.

August 12

- 00:00 UTC (5:00 p.m. PDT, August 11) at 18.5°N 112.9°W – Tropical Depression Ten-E strengthens into Tropical Storm Hector about 565 mi (905 km) west of Manzanillo.

August 13

- 18:00 UTC (11:00 a.m. PDT) at 17.1°N 104.0°W – Tropical Depression Eleven-E forms from a tropical wave about 140 mi (220 km) south of Manzanillo.

August 14

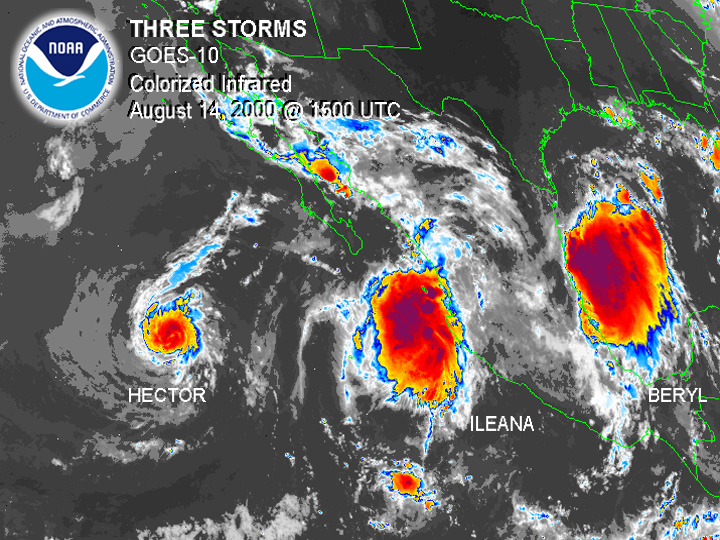
Infrared satellite image of Hurricane Hector (left) and Tropical Storm Ileana (center), along with Atlantic Tropical Storm Beryl (right), on August 14

- 00:00 UTC (5:00 p.m. PDT, August 13) at 18.4°N 118.4°W – Tropical Storm Hector strengthens into a Category 1 hurricane about 625 mi (1,010 km) west-southwest of Cabo San Lucas.
- 00:00 UTC (5:00 p.m. PDT, August 13) at 17.7°N 104.7°W – Tropical Depression Eleven-E strengthens into Tropical Storm Ileana about 100 mi (155 km) south-southwest of Manzanillo.
- 12:00 UTC (5:00 a.m. PDT) at 19.1°N 119.3°W – Hurricane Hector attains its peak intensity, with maximum sustained winds of 80 mph (130 km/h) and a minimum central pressure of 983 mbar (29.03 inHg), about 655 mi (1,055 km) west-southwest of Cabo San Lucas.

August 15

- 06:00 UTC (11:00 p.m. PDT, August 14) at 20.3°N 121.2°W – Hurricane Hector weakens into a tropical storm about 740 mi (1,195 km) west-southwest of Cabo San Lucas.
- 06:00 UTC (11:00 p.m. PDT, August 14) at 21.5°N 108.5°W – Tropical Storm Ileana attains its peak intensity, with maximum sustained winds of 70 mph (110 km/h) and a minimum central pressure of 991 mbar (29.26 inHg), about 130 mi (215 km) southeast of Cabo San Lucas.
- 12:00 UTC (2:00 a.m. HST) at 33.4°N 179.8°W – Tropical Depression 16W crosses the IDL into the Central Pacific basin about 1,435 mi (2,305 km) northwest of Niʻihau.

August 16

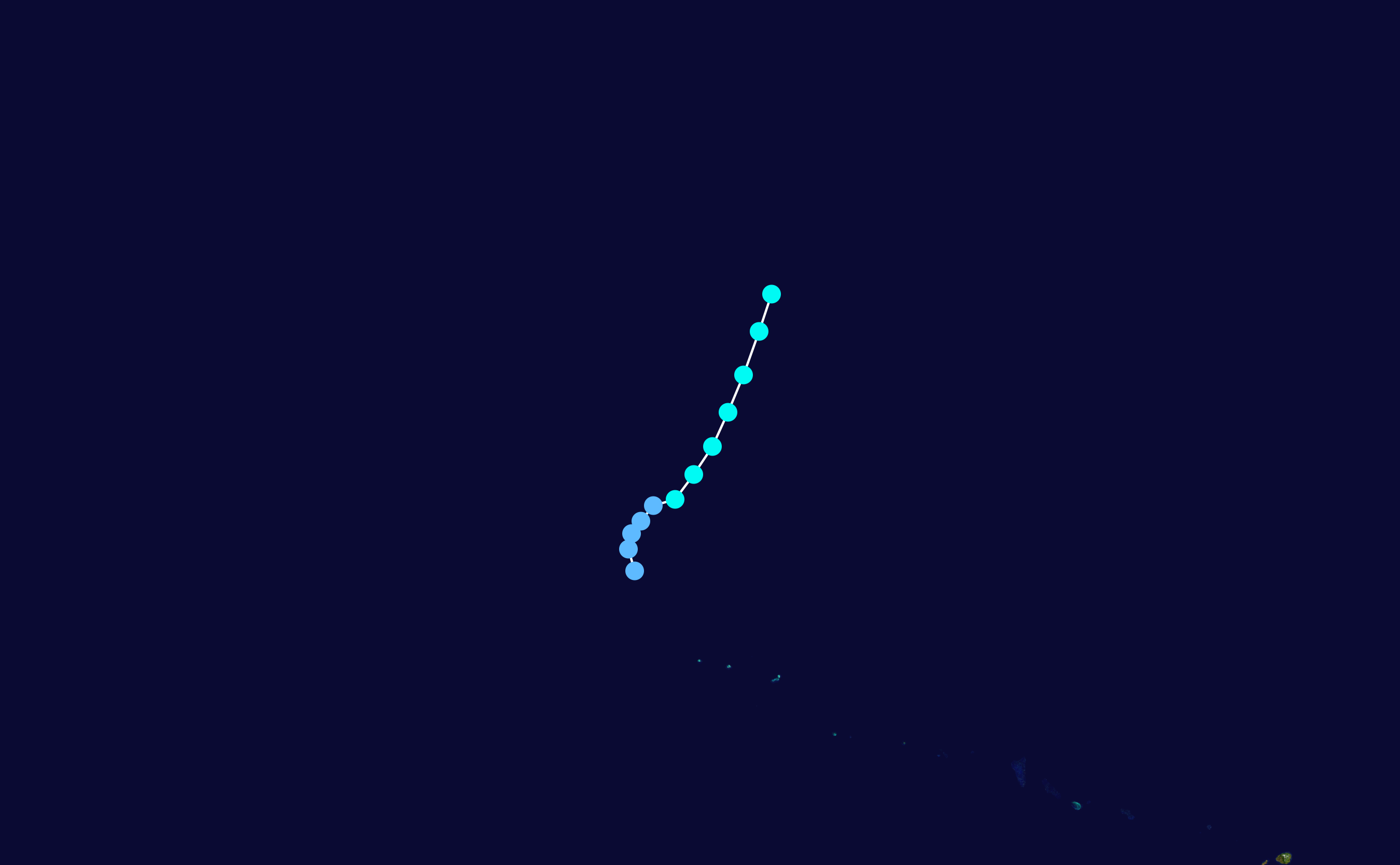
Storm path of Tropical Storm Wene

- 00:00 UTC (2:00 p.m. HST, August 15) at 34.4°N 178.5°W – Tropical Depression 16W strengthens into Tropical Storm Wene about 1,405 mi (2,260 km) northwest of Niʻihau. It simultaneously attains its peak intensity, with maximum sustained winds of 50 mph (85 km/h) and an unknown minimum central pressure. (Note: The entry for Tropical Storm Wene in the Eastern and Central Pacific Hurricane Database (HURDAT), as well as the Central Pacific Hurricane Center's (CPHC) post-season report on tropical cyclone activity within the Central Pacific basin, initiate Tropical Storm Wene at 00:00 UTC on August 16 (2:00 p.m. HST on August 15). The Joint Typhoon Warning Center (JTWC) disagrees with HURDAT and the CPHC both on when the system became a tropical storm and how strong it became, upgrading Tropical Depression 16W to a tropical storm at 18:00 UTC (8:00 a.m. HST) on August 15 with maximum sustained winds of 65 mph (100 km/h) while located at 33.7°N 179.2°W.)
- 06:00 UTC (11:00 p.m. PDT, August 15) at 20.0°N 125.0°W – Tropical Storm Hector weakens into a tropical depression about 985 mi (1,585 km) west of Cabo San Lucas.
- 18:00 UTC (11:00 a.m. PDT) at 20.0°N 128.0°W – Tropical Depression Hector is last noted as a tropical cyclone about 1,175 mi (1,890 km) west of Cabo San Lucas, dissipating shortly thereafter.
- 18:00 UTC (11:00 a.m. PDT) at 23.0°N 113.6°W – Tropical Storm Ileana weakens into a tropical depression about 230 mi (370 km) west of Cabo San Lucas.

August 17

- 00:00 UTC (5:00 p.m. PDT, August 16) at 23.3°N 114.5°W – Tropical Depression Ileana is last noted as a tropical cyclone about 290 mi (465 km) west of Cabo San Lucas, dissipating shortly thereafter.
- 06:00 UTC (8:00 p.m. HST, August 16) at 40.2°N 176.0°W (Note: Position according to HURDAT and the CPHC; the JTWC lists Wene's position at this time as being slightly further east, at 40.2°N 175.8°W.) – Tropical Storm Wene is last noted as a tropical cyclone about 1,565 mi (2,520 km) northwest of Niʻihau, dissipating shortly thereafter.

August 28

- 06:00 UTC (11:00 p.m. PDT, August 27) at 14.9°N 137.4°W – Tropical Depression Twelve-E forms from an Intertropical Convergence Zone (ITCZ) disturbance about 1,870 mi (3,010 km) west-southwest of Cabo San Lucas.
- 12:00 UTC (5:00 p.m. PDT) at 15.1°N 137.8°W – Tropical Depression Twelve-E strengthens into Tropical Storm John about 1,895 mi (3,045 km) west-southwest of Cabo San Lucas.

August 30

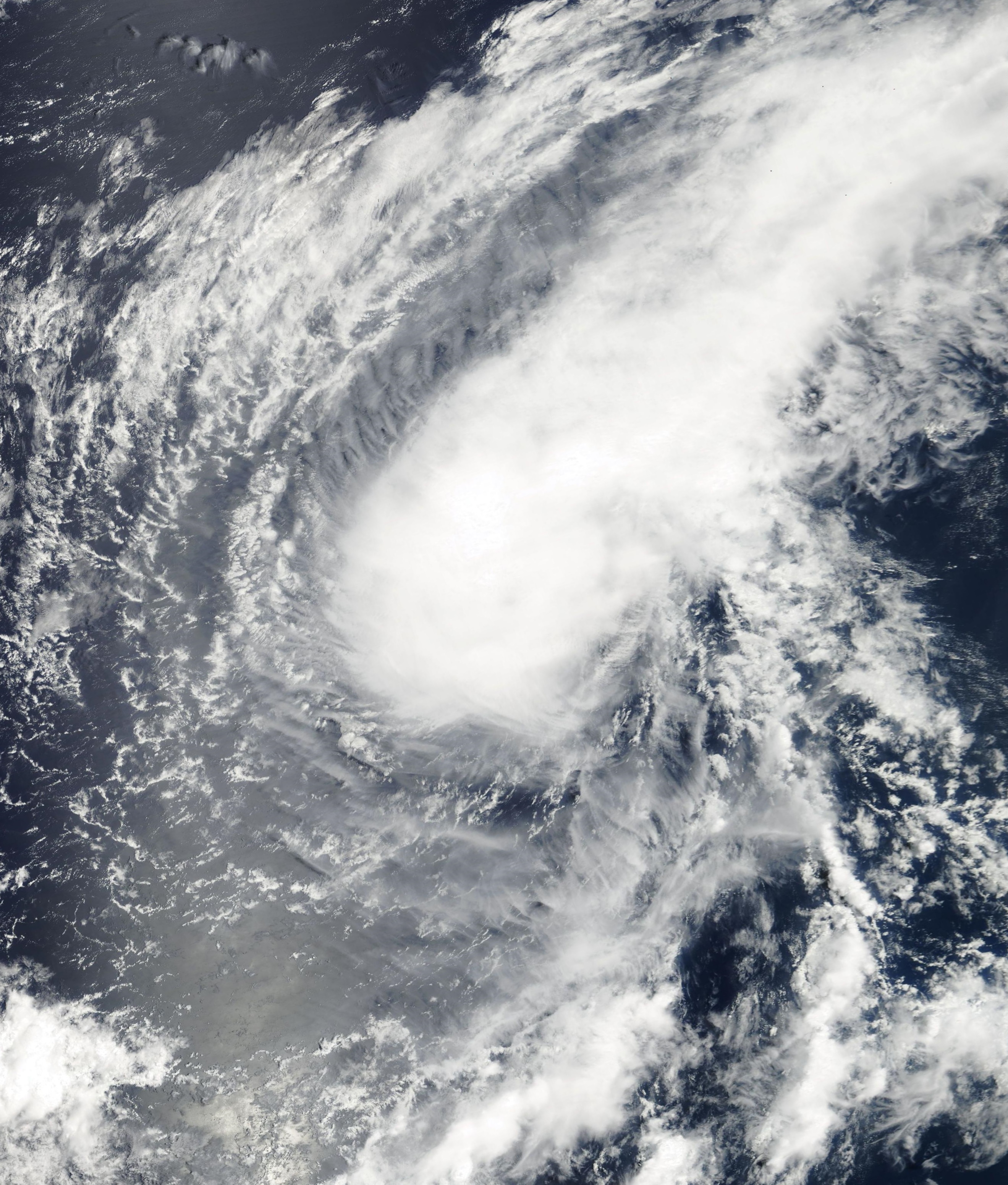
Tropical Storm John near peak intensity late on August 30

- 00:00 UTC (2:00 p.m. HST, August 29) at 16.9°N 140.1°W – Tropical Storm John crosses 140°W into the Central Pacific basin about 985 mi (1,585 km) east of Cape Kumukahi Light.
- 18:00 UTC (8:00 a.m. HST) at 17.3°N 140.4°W – Tropical Storm John attains its peak intensity, with maximum sustained winds of 70 mph (110 km/h) and a minimum central pressure of 994 mbar (29.35 inHg), about 955 mi (1,535 km) east of Cape Kumukahi Light.

August 31

- 00:00 UTC (5:00 p.m. PDT, August 30) at 13.0°N 131.4°W – Tropical Depression Thirteen-E forms from an area of disturbed weather about 1,560 mi (2,510 km) west-southwest of Cabo San Lucas.

=== September ===
September 1

- 00:00 UTC (2:00 p.m. HST, August 31) at 17.3°N 141.9°W – Tropical Storm John weakens into a tropical depression about 855 mi (1,380 km) east of Cape Kumukahi Light.
- 12:00 UTC (2:00 a.m. HST) at 17.5°N 141.9°W – Tropical Depression John is last noted as a tropical cyclone about 855 mi (1,380 km) east of Cape Kumukahi Light, dissipating shortly thereafter.

September 2

- 00:00 UTC (5:00 p.m. PDT, September 1) at 13.2°N 133.3°W – Tropical Depression Thirteen-E strengthens into Tropical Storm Kristy about 1,670 mi (2,685 km) west-southwest of Cabo San Lucas. It simultaneously attains its peak intensity, with maximum sustained winds of 40 mph (65 km/h) and a minimum central pressure of 1,004 mbar (29.65 inHg).
- 18:00 UTC (11:00 a.m. PDT) at 14.3°N 133.2°W – Tropical Storm Kristy weakens into a tropical depression about 1,630 mi (2,620 km) west-southwest of Cabo San Lucas.

September 3

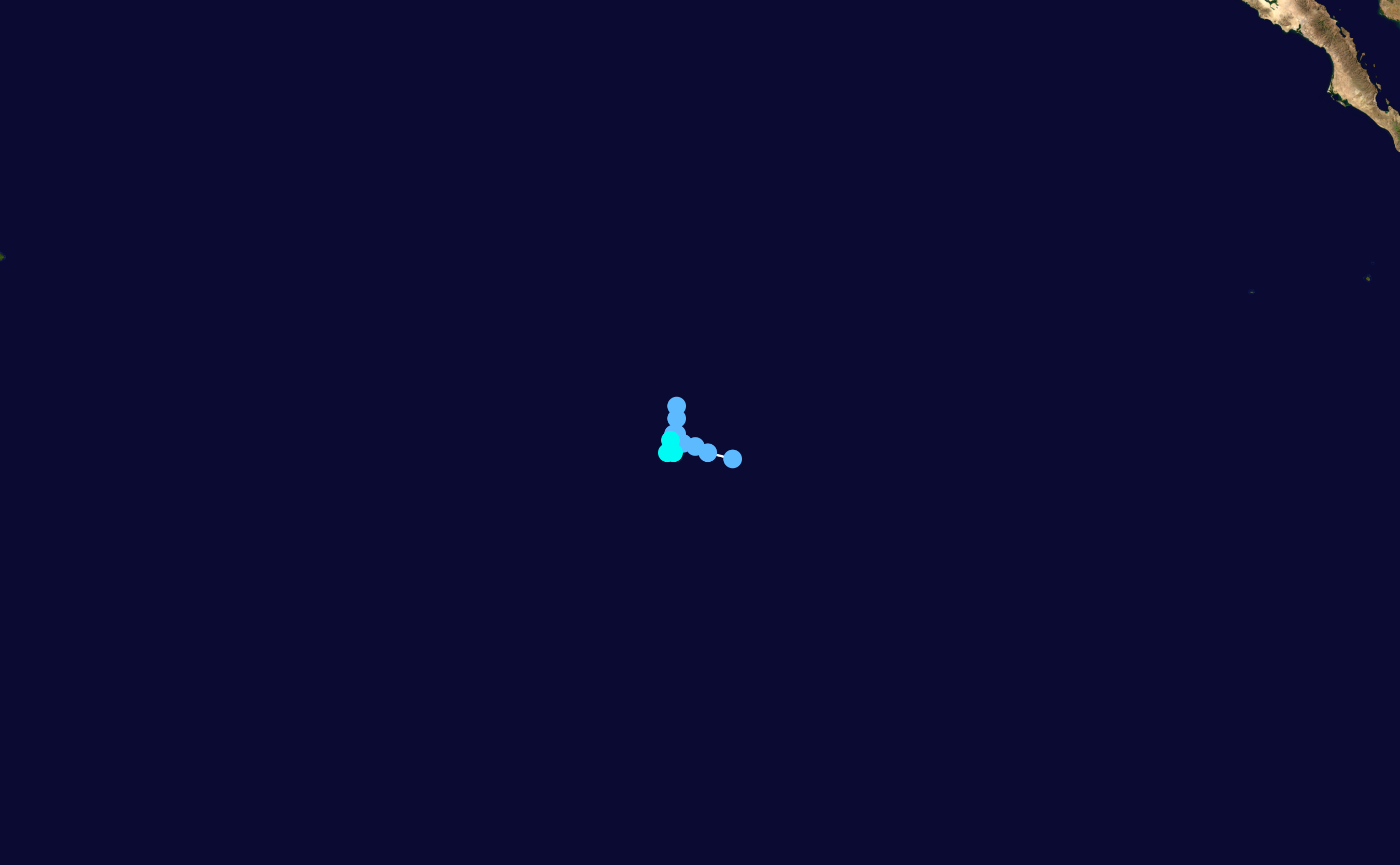
Storm path of Tropical Storm Kristy

- 00:00 UTC (5:00 p.m. PDT, September 2) at 14.7°N 133.2°W – Tropical Depression Kristy is last noted as a tropical cyclone about 1,615 mi (2,600 km) west-southwest of Cabo San Lucas, dissipating shortly thereafter.

September 5

- 00:00 UTC (5:00 p.m. PDT, September 4) at 15.4°N 102.2°W – Tropical Depression Fourteen-E forms from a tropical wave about 290 mi (465 km) south-southeast of Manzanillo.
- 12:00 UTC (5:00 a.m. PDT) at 15.9°N 105.1°W – Tropical Depression Fourteen-E strengthens into Tropical Storm Lane about 225 mi (360 km) south-southwest of Manzanillo, then spends the next three days executing a counter-clockwise loop off the coast of Mexico.

September 9

- 00:00 UTC (5:00 p.m. PDT, September 8) at 17.1°N 109.4°W – Tropical Storm Lane strengthens into a Category 1 hurricane about 155 mi (250 km) southeast of Socorro Island.

September 10

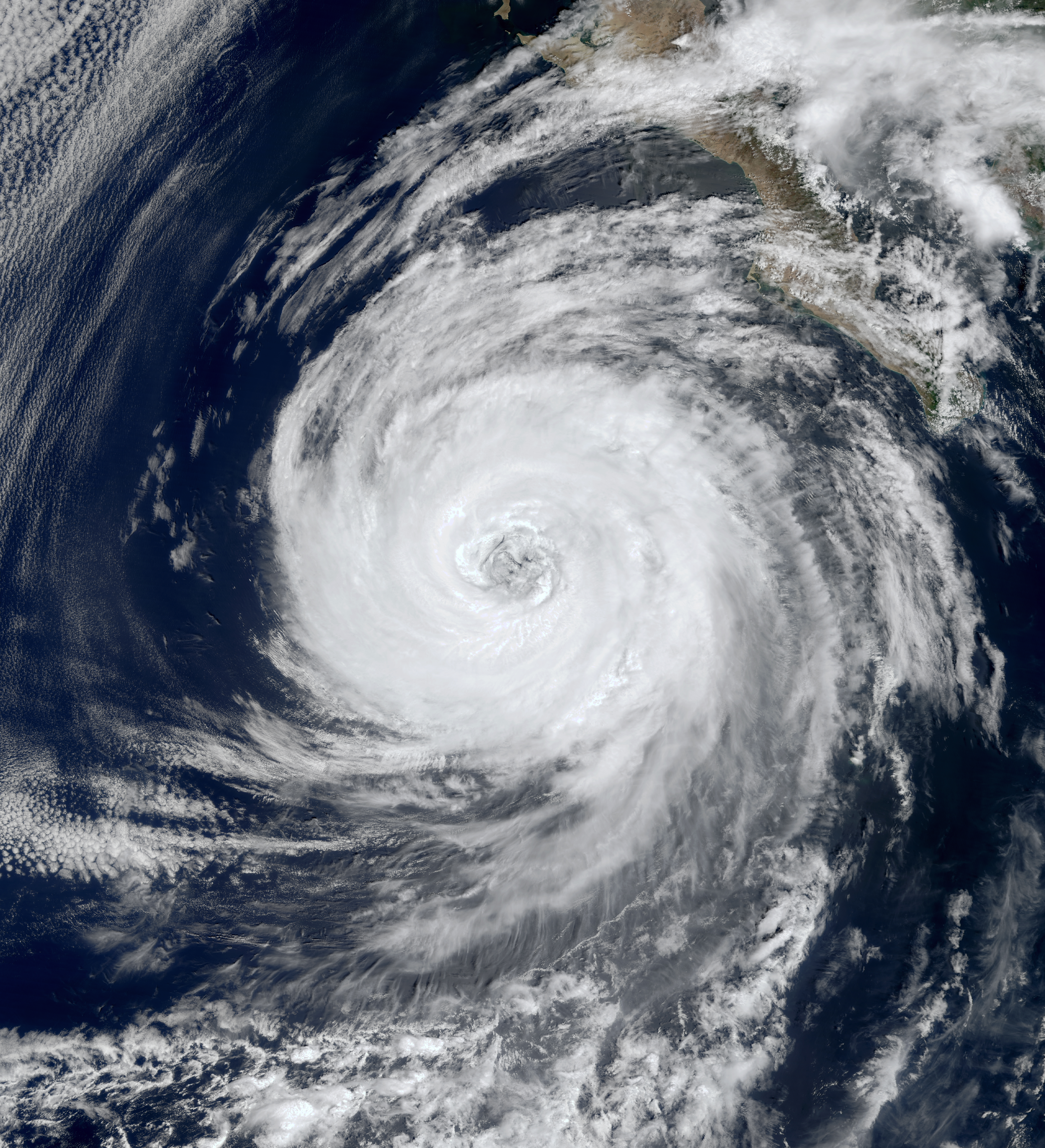
Hurricane Lane near peak intensity on September 10

- 00:00 UTC (5:00 p.m. PDT, September 9) at 20.2°N 112.5°W – Hurricane Lane strengthens to Category 2 intensity about 140 mi (220 km) northwest of Socorro Island.
- 06:00 UTC (11:00 p.m. PDT, September 9) at 20.5°N 113.5°W – Hurricane Lane attains its peak intensity, with maximum sustained winds of 100 mph (155 km/h) and a minimum central pressure of 967 mbar (28.56 inHg), about 200 mi (325 km) northwest of Socorro Island.

September 11

- 00:00 UTC (5:00 p.m. PDT, September 10) at 21.7°N 115.8°W – Hurricane Lane weakens to Category 1 intensity about 375 mi (600 km) northwest of Socorro Island, or about 380 mi (610 km) west of Cabo San Lucas.
- 18:00 UTC (11:00 a.m. PDT) at 23.0°N 119.0°W – Hurricane Lane weakens into a tropical storm about 575 mi (925 km) west of Cabo San Lucas.

September 13

- 12:00 UTC (5:00 a.m. PDT) at 29.1°N 122.9°W – Tropical Storm Lane weakens into a tropical depression about 420 mi (675 km) southwest of San Diego, California.

September 14

- 00:00 UTC (5:00 p.m. PDT, September 13) at 32.2°N 122.2°W – Tropical Depression Lane is last noted as a tropical cyclone about 295 mi (470 km) west of San Diego, dissipating shortly thereafter.

September 15

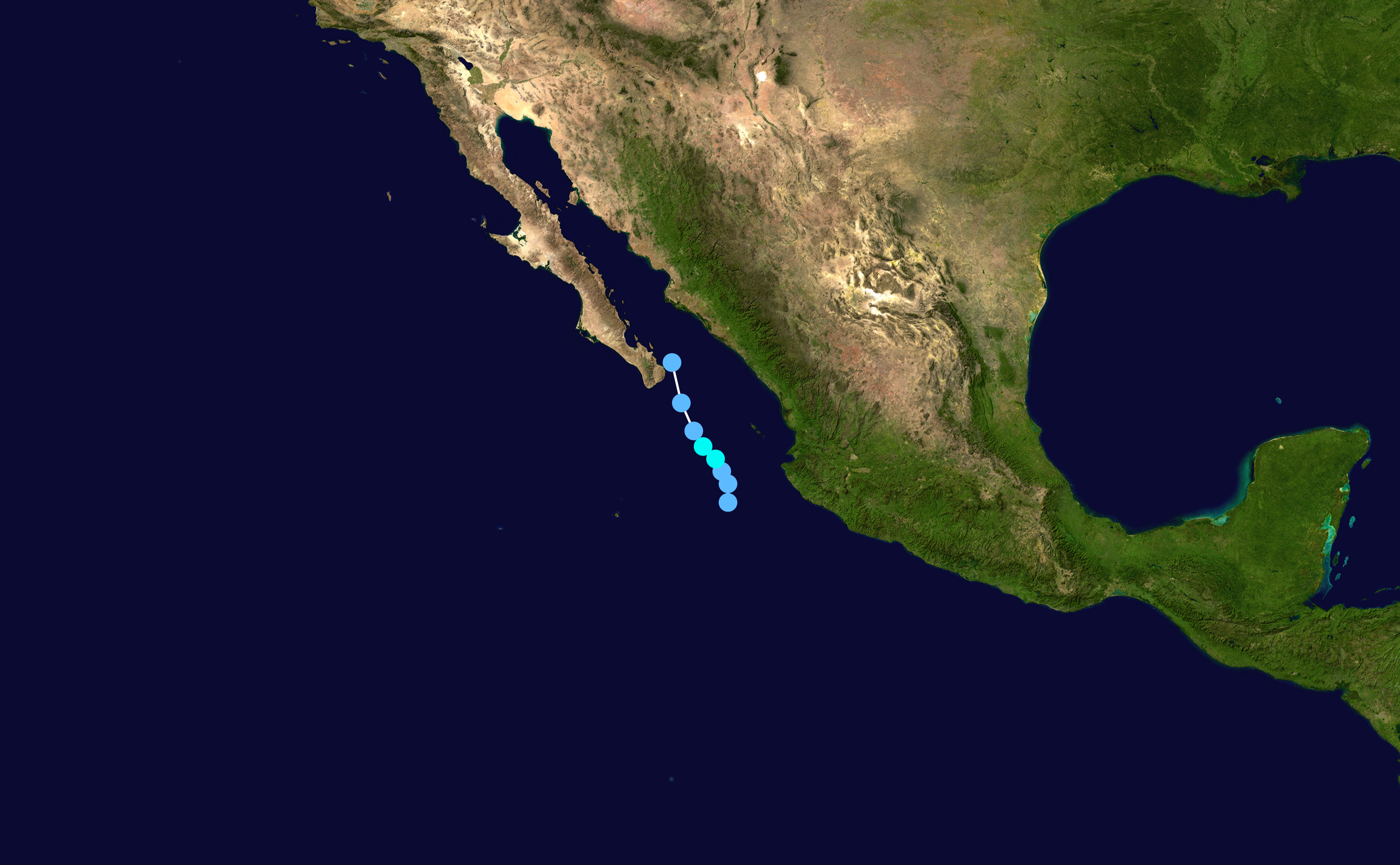
Storm path of Tropical Storm Miriam

- 18:00 UTC (11:00 a.m. PDT) at 19.2°N 107.4°W – Tropical Depression Fifteen-E forms from a tropical wave about 305 mi (490 km) southeast of Cabo San Lucas.

September 16

- 12:00 UTC (5:00 a.m. PDT) at 20.6°N 107.8°W – Tropical Depression Fifteen-E strengthens into Tropical Storm Miriam about 205 mi (335 km) southeast of Cabo San Lucas. It simultaneously attains its peak intensity, with maximum sustained winds of 40 mph (65 km/h) and a minimum central pressure of 1004 mbar (29.65 inHg).

September 17

- 00:00 UTC (5:00 p.m. PDT, September 16) at 21.5°N 108.5°W – Tropical Storm Miriam weakens into a tropical depression about 130 mi (215 km) southeast of Cabo San Lucas.
- 12:00 UTC (5:00 a.m. PDT) at 23.7°N 109.2°W – Tropical Depression Miriam is last noted as a tropical cyclone over the extreme southern Gulf of California about 75 mi (120 km) northeast of Cabo San Lucas, dissipating shortly thereafter.

September 20

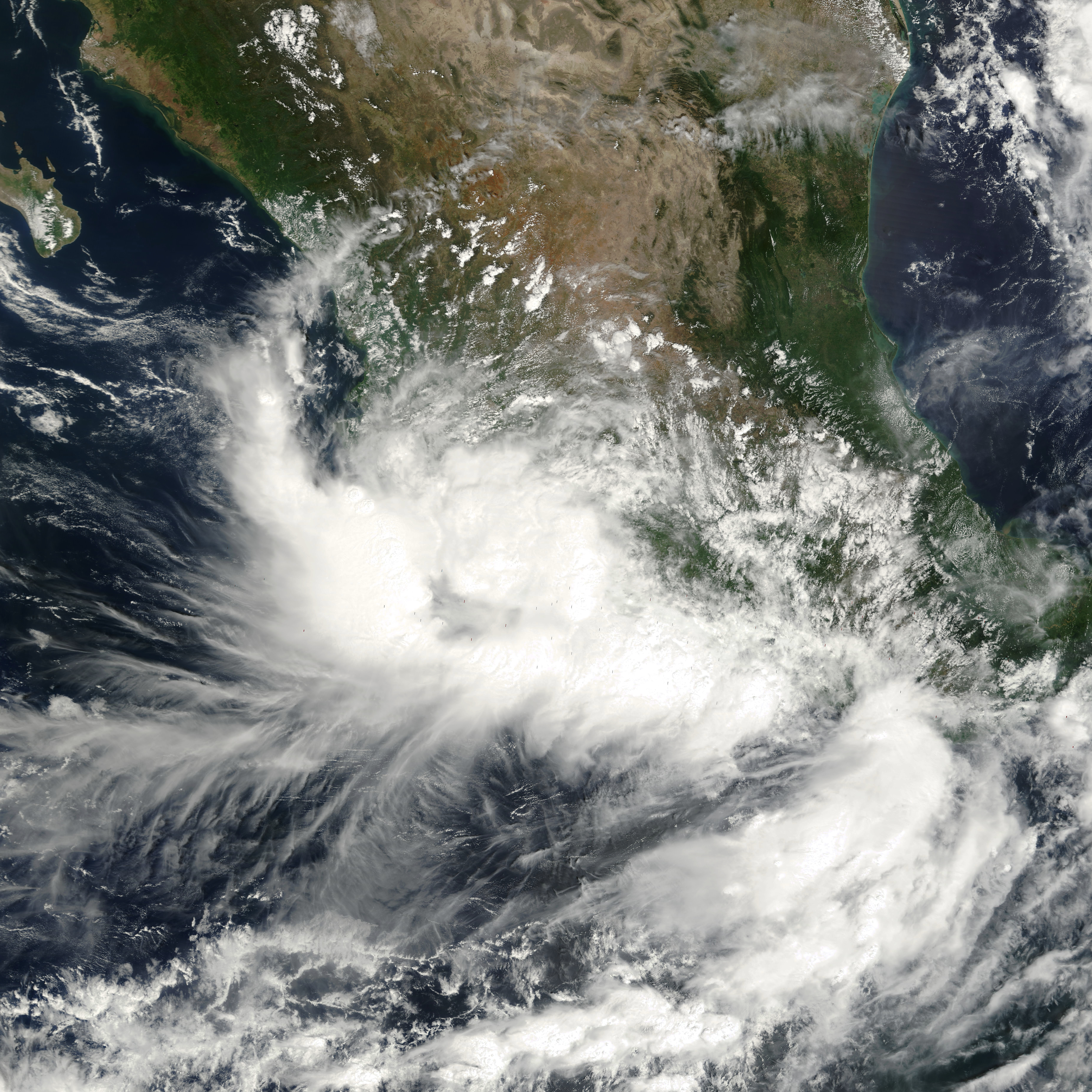
Tropical Storm Norman approaching Mexico near peak intensity on September 20

- 00:00 UTC (5:00 p.m. PDT, September 19) at 16.8°N 103.4°W – Tropical Depression Sixteen-E forms from an interaction between a tropical wave and a Central American gyre about 165 mi (270 km) south-southeast of Manzanillo, or about 115 mi (185 km) southeast of Lázaro Cárdenas, Michoacán.
- 12:00 UTC (5:00 a.m. PDT) at 17.8°N 102.9°W – Tropical Depression Sixteen-E strengthens into Tropical Storm Norman about 45 mi (75 km) west-southwest of Lázaro Cárdenas.
- 18:00 UTC (11:00 a.m. PDT) at 18.3°N 103.1°W – Tropical Storm Norman attains its peak intensity, with maximum sustained winds of 50 mph (85 km/h) and a minimum central pressure of 998 mbar (29.47 inHg), about 65 mi (100 km) west-northwest of Lázaro Cárdenas.
- 20:00 UTC (1:00 p.m. PDT) at 18.4°N 103.2°W – Tropical Storm Norman makes its first landfall about 75 mi (120 km) west-northwest of Lázaro Cárdenas with maximum sustained winds of 50 mph (85 km/h) and a central pressure of 1000 mbar (29.53 inHg).

September 21

- 06:00 UTC (11:00 p.m. PDT, September 20) at 19.5°N 104.2°W – Tropical Storm Norman weakens into a tropical depression over land about 35 mi (55 km) north-northeast of Manzanillo, and later emerges over water just north of Puerto Vallarta, Jalisco.

September 22

- 15:00 UTC (8:00 a.m. PDT) at 23.1°N 106.3°W – Tropical Depression Norman makes its second and final landfall near Mazatlán, Sinaloa, with maximum sustained winds of 30 mph (45 km/h) and a central pressure of 1006 mbar (29.71 inHg).
- 18:00 UTC (11:00 a.m. PDT) at 23.7°N 106.3°W – Tropical Depression Norman is last noted as a tropical cyclone about 35 mi (55 km) north of Mazatlán, dissipating shortly thereafter.

=== October ===
October 2

- 12:00 UTC (5:00 a.m. PDT) at 15.3°N 103.1°W – Tropical Depression Seventeen-E forms from a tropical wave about 270 mi (435 km) south-southeast of Manzanillo.

October 3

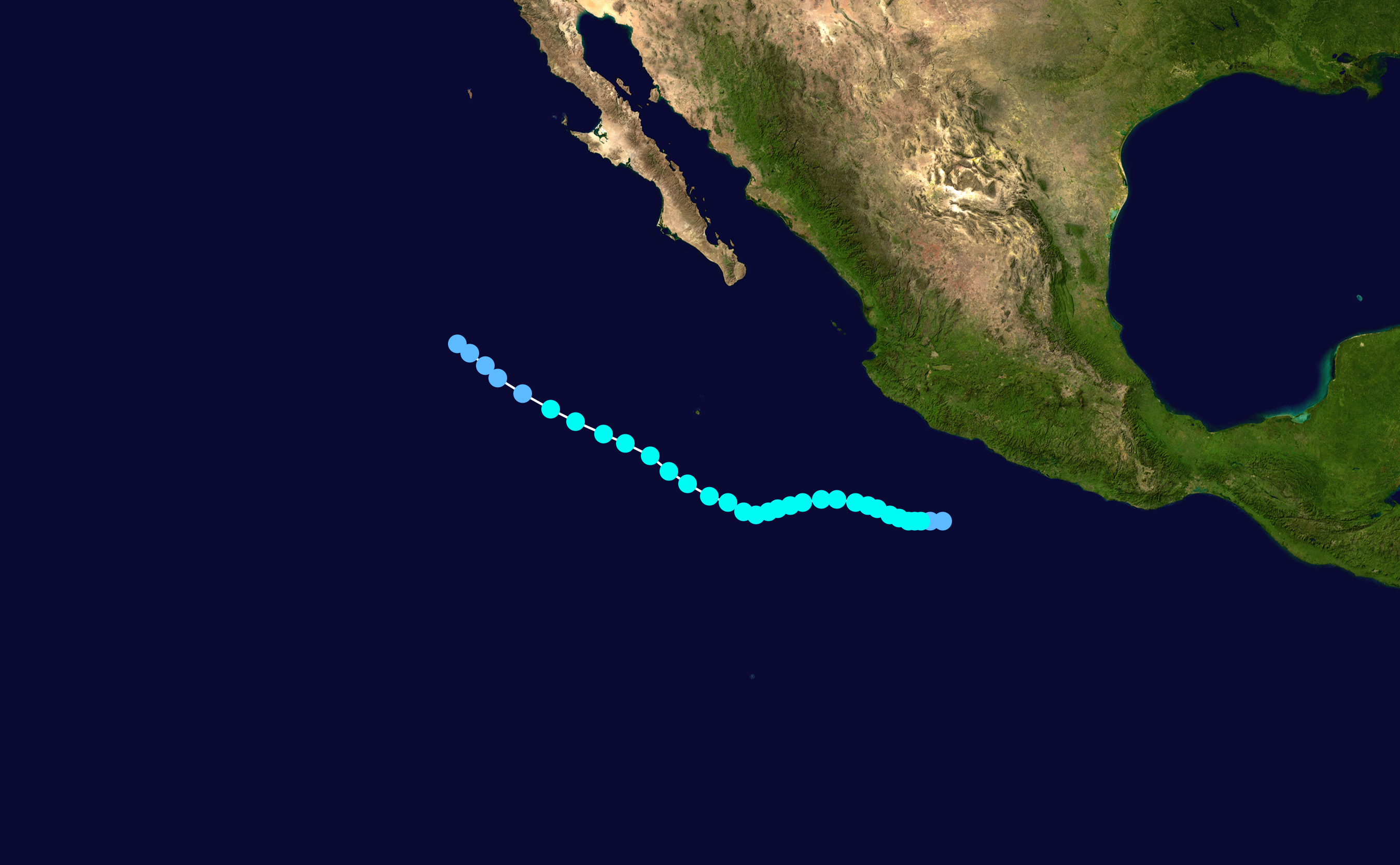
Storm path of Tropical Storm Olivia

- 00:00 UTC (5:00 p.m. PDT, October 2) at 15.3°N 103.8°W – Tropical Depression Seventeen-E strengthens into Tropical Storm Olivia about 260 mi (415 km) south of Manzanillo.
- 18:00 UTC (11:00 a.m. PDT) at 15.4°N 104.5°W – Tropical Storm Olivia attains its peak intensity, with maximum sustained winds of 65 mph (100 km/h) and a minimum central pressure of 994 mbar (29.35 inHg), about 255 mi (405 km) south of Manzanillo.

October 9

- 06:00 UTC (11:00 p.m. PDT, October 8) at 19.4°N 116.6°W – Tropical Storm Olivia weakens into a tropical depression about 490 mi (785 km) west-southwest of Cabo San Lucas.

October 10

- 06:00 UTC (11:00 p.m. PDT, October 9) at 21.0°N 118.7°W – Tropical Depression Olivia is last noted as a tropical cyclone about 575 mi (925 km) west-southwest of Cabo San Lucas, dissipating shortly thereafter.

October 25

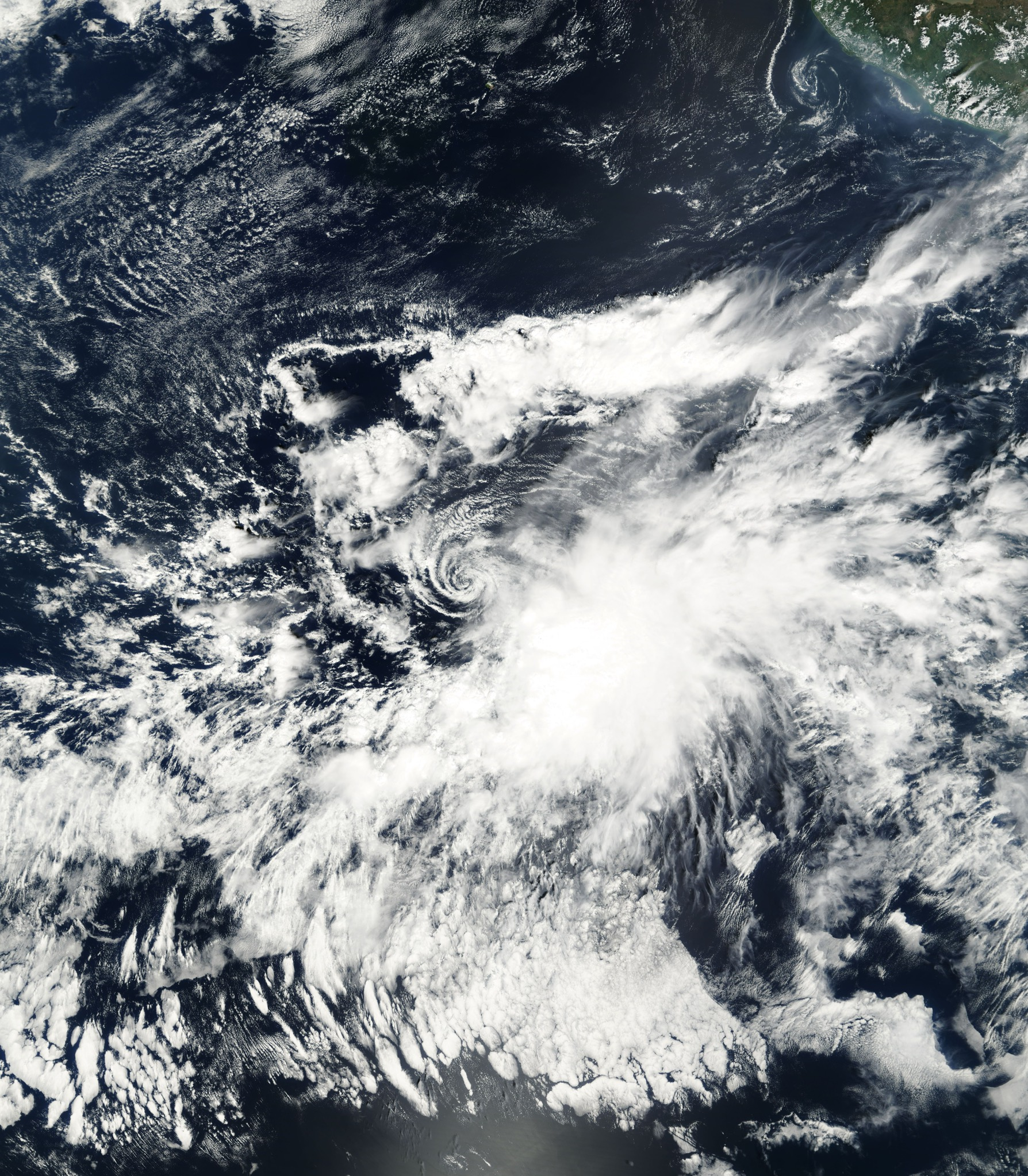
Tropical Depression Eighteen-E—future Tropical Storm Paul—on October 25

- 06:00 UTC (11:00 p.m. PDT, October 24) at 10.2°N 108.4°W – Tropical Depression Eighteen-E forms from an ITCZ disturbance about 880 mi (1,415 km) south of Cabo San Lucas.

October 26

- 12:00 UTC (5:00 a.m. PDT) at 10.3°N 115.4°W – Tropical Depression Eighteen-E strengthens into Tropical Storm Paul about 940 mi (1,510 km) south-southwest of Cabo San Lucas.
- 18:00 UTC (11:00 a.m. PDT) at 10.3°N 116.7°W – Tropical Storm Paul attains its peak intensity, with maximum sustained winds of 45 mph (75 km/h) and a minimum central pressure of 1003 mbar (29.62 inHg), about 980 mi (1,575 km) south-southwest of Cabo San Lucas.

October 28

- 00:00 UTC (5:00 p.m. PDT, October 27) at 11.7°N 122.0°W – Tropical Storm Paul weakens into a tropical depression about 1,105 mi (1,780 km) southwest of Cabo San Lucas.

October 29

- 00:00 UTC (5:00 p.m. PDT, October 28) at 11.7°N 128.5°W – Tropical Depression Paul is last noted as a tropical cyclone about 1,445 mi (2,325 km) southwest of Cabo San Lucas, dissipating shortly thereafter.

=== November ===
November 3

- 18:00 UTC (10:00 a.m. PST) (Note: Daylight saving time ended on October 29, 2000. At 2:00 a.m. PDT, clocks were moved back to 1:00 a.m. PST.) at 10.3°N 89.8°W – Tropical Depression Nineteen-E forms from an area of disturbed weather about 240 mi (390 km) south of where the El Salvador–Guatemala border meets the Pacific Ocean.

November 5

- 12:00 UTC (4:00 a.m. PST) at 10.8°N 97.0°W – Tropical Depression Nineteen-E strengthens into Tropical Storm Rosa about 390 mi (630 km) south of Puerto Ángel, Oaxaca.

November 6

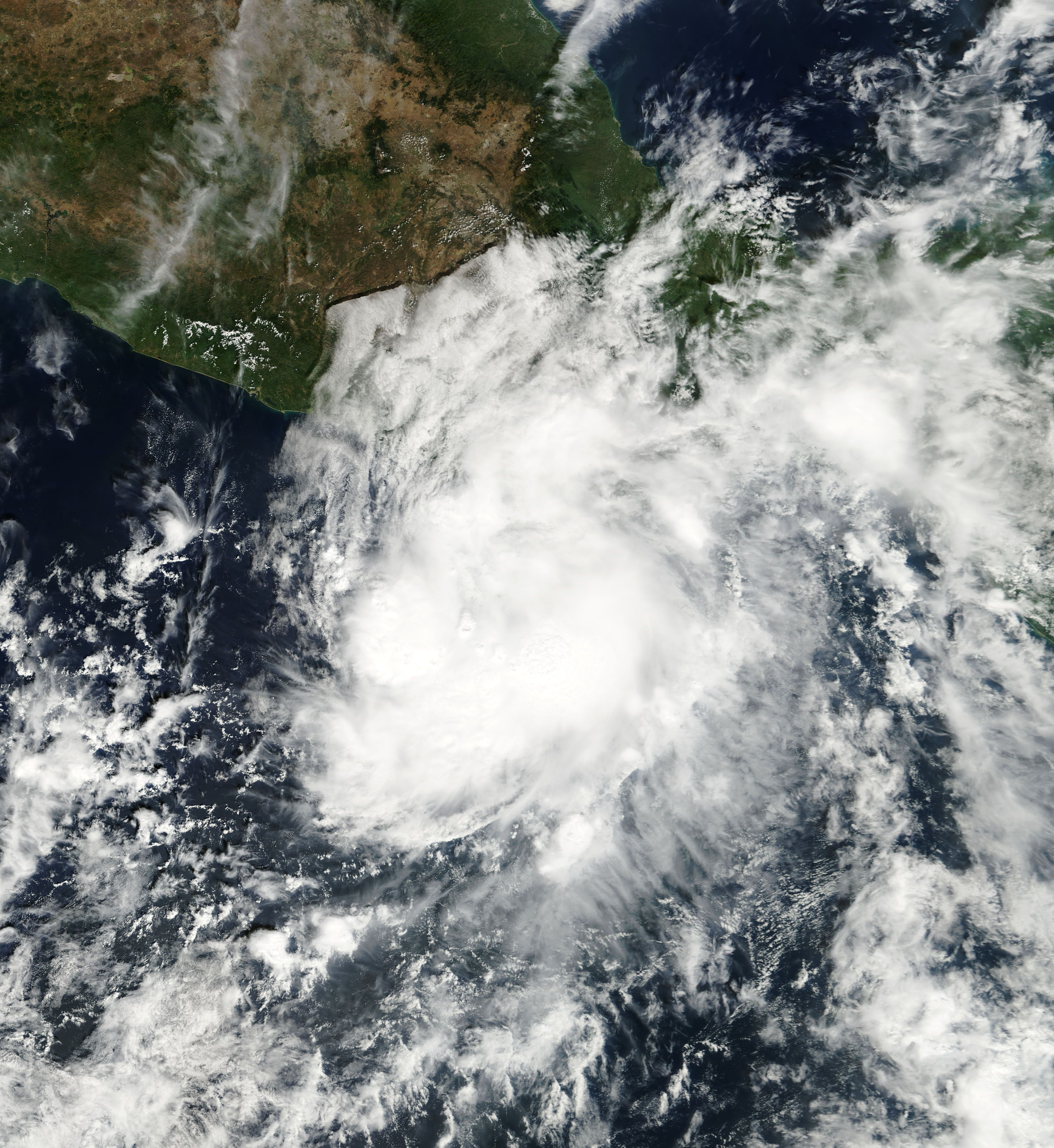
Tropical Storm Rosa gradually weakening prior to landfall on November 7

- 18:00 UTC (10:00 a.m. PST) at 12.7°N 98.7°W – Tropical Storm Rosa attains its peak intensity, with maximum sustained winds of 65 mph (100 km/h) and a minimum central pressure of 993 mbar (29.32 inHg), about 255 mi (405 km) southwest of Puerto Ángel.

November 8

- 07:00 UTC (11:00 p.m. PST, November 7) at 15.7°N 96.3°W – Tropical Storm Rosa makes landfall near Huatulco, Oaxaca, with maximum sustained winds of 40 mph (65 km/h) and a central pressure of 1002 mbar (29.59 inHg).
- 12:00 UTC (4:00 a.m. PST) at 16.3°N 95.9°W – Tropical Storm Rosa weakens into a tropical depression over land about 40 mi (65 km) northeast of Huatulco, dissipating shortly thereafter.

November 30

- The 2000 Pacific hurricane season officially ends.

== See also ==
- Timeline of the 2000 Atlantic hurricane season
- Pacific hurricane season
- Tropical cyclones in 2000
