= Timeline of the 2000 Atlantic hurricane season =

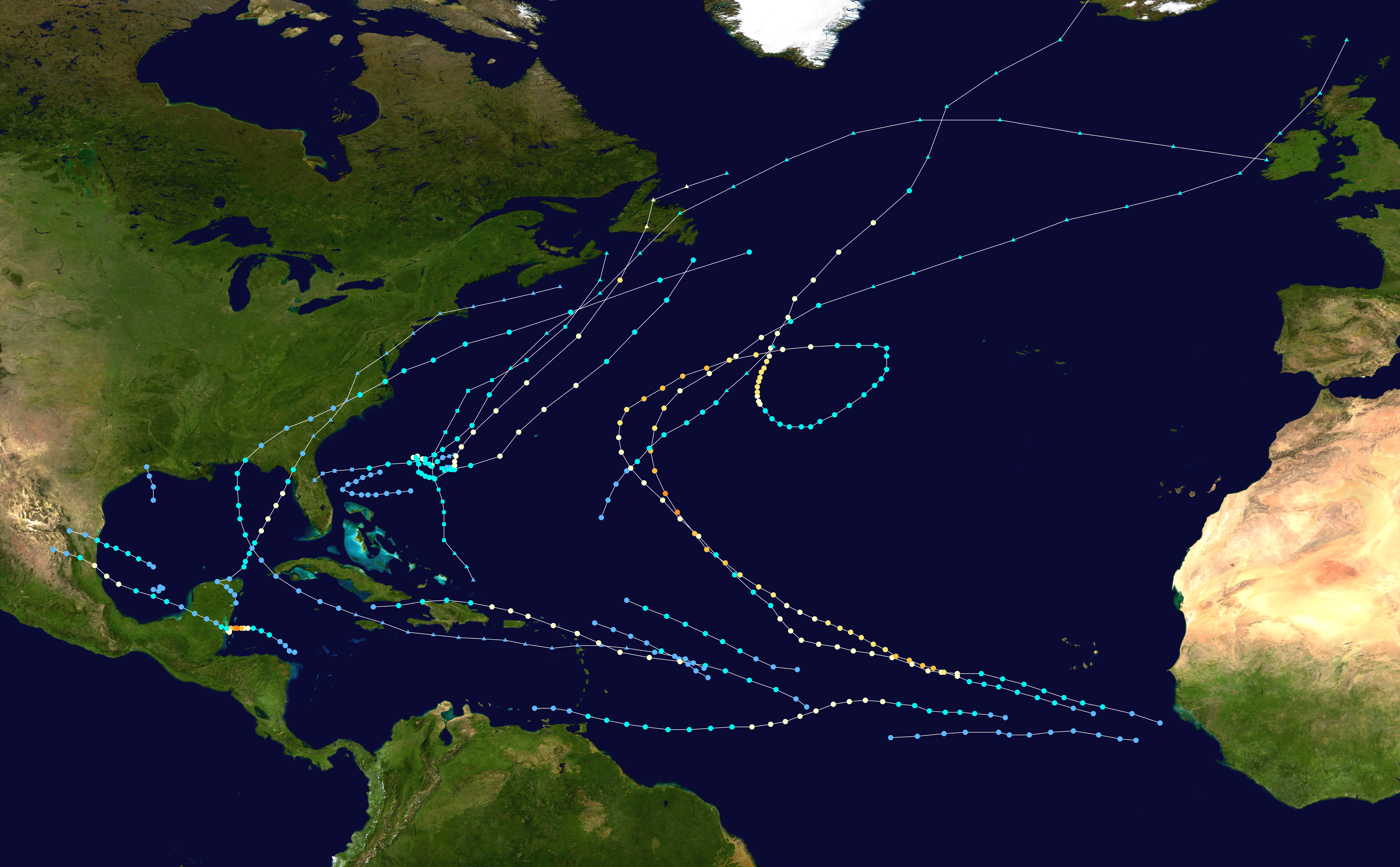
- Season summary map

Season boundaries
- First system formed: June 7, 2000
- Last system dissipated: October 19, 2000

Strongest system
- Name: Keith
- Maximum winds: 140 mph (220 km/h) (1-minute sustained)
- Lowest pressure: 939 mbar (hPa; 27.73 inHg)

Longest lasting system
- Name: Alberto
- Duration: 19.75 days
Storm articles
- Hurricane Debby (2000)
- Hurricane Gordon (2000)
- Tropical Storm Helene (2000)
- Hurricane Keith
- Tropical Storm Leslie (2000)
- Hurricane Michael (2000)

The 2000 Atlantic hurricane season was an event in the annual tropical cyclone season in the north Atlantic Ocean. There was above-normal activity during the season, (Note: An average Atlantic hurricane season, as defined by the National Oceanic and Atmospheric Administration, has 12 tropical storms, six hurricanes and two major hurricanes.) with nearly all its activity occurring during a three-month period, August–October. The season officially began on June 1, 2000 and ended on November 30, 2000. These dates, adopted by convention, historically describe the period in each year when most tropical systems form. Although two tropical depressions formed in June, the first named storm, Alberto, did not arise until August 4. The season's final storm, an unnamed subtropical storm, became extratropical on October 29.

The 2000 season produced 15 cyclones of at least tropical (14) or subtropical (1) storm strength. Four of the tropical storms became hurricanes, of which three developed into major hurricanes. (Note: Hurricanes reaching Category 3 and higher on the Saffir–Simpson scale are considered major hurricanes.) There were also four depressions that failed to reach tropical storm strength. The two most significant storms of the season, in terms of loss of life and damage, were Hurricanes Gordon and Keith. Gordon made land fall in the eastern Yucatán Peninsula, traversed the Gulf of Mexico, and made landfall along the Gulf Coast of the United States. Keith made landfall in Belize, crossed the Yucatán, moved over the Gulf, and made landfall in northeastern Mexico.

This timeline documents tropical cyclone formations, strengthening, weakening, landfalls, extratropical transitions, and dissipations during the season. It includes information that was not released throughout the season, meaning that data from post-storm reviews by the National Hurricane Center, such as a storm that was not initially warned upon, has been included.

The time stamp for each event is first stated using Coordinated Universal Time (UTC), the 24-hour clock where 00:00 = midnight UTC. The NHC uses both UTC and the time zone where the center of the tropical cyclone is currently located. The time zones utilized (east to west) prior to 2020 were: Atlantic, Eastern, and Central. In this timeline, the respective area time is included in parentheses. Additionally, figures for maximum sustained winds and position estimates are rounded to the nearest 5 units (miles, or kilometers), following National Hurricane Center practice. Direct wind observations are rounded to the nearest whole number. Atmospheric pressures are listed to the nearest millibar and nearest hundredth of an inch of mercury.

== Timeline ==
=== June ===
June 1

- The 2000 Atlantic hurricane season officially begins.

June 7

- 21:00 UTC (4:00 p.m. CDT) near 21.2°N 93.1°W – Tropical Depression One develops in the southern Gulf of Mexico roughly 450 mi (720 km) southeast of Brownsville, Texas and simultaneously attains its peak intensity with winds of 30 mph (45 km/h) and a minimum barometric pressure of 1008 mbar (hPa; 29.77 inHg).

June 8

- 21:00 UTC (4:00 p.m. CDT) near 20.5°N 94.5°W – Tropical Depression One has dissipated into a broad area of low pressure roughly 250 mi (400 km) east-southeast of Tampico, Tamaulipas.

June 23

- 00:00 UTC (8:00 p.m. AST June 22) near 9.5°N 19.8°W – Tropical Depression Two develops about 350 mi (560 km) southeast of the Cape Verde Islands.

June 25

- 09:00 UTC (5:00 a.m. AST) near 10.2°N 35.1°W – Tropical Depression Two attains its peak intensity with winds 35 mph (55 km/h) and a minimum barometric pressure of 1006 mbar (hPa; 29.71 inHg) about 1675 mi (2700 km) east of the Windward Islands.
- 21:00 UTC (5:00 p.m. AST) near 9.5°N 39.5°W – Tropical Depression Two has degenerated into a tropical wave about 1420 mi (2285 km) east of the southern Windward Islands.

=== July ===
- No tropical cyclones form in the Atlantic Ocean during the month of July.

=== August ===
Hurricane Alberto on August 19, 2000

August 3

- 18:00 UTC (2:00 p.m. AST) near 10.8°N 18.0°W – Tropical Depression Three develops west of Guinea-Bissau.

August 4

- 06:00 UTC (2:00 a.m. AST) near 12.0°N 22.3°W – Tropical Depression Three intensifies into Tropical Storm Alberto south-southeast of the Cape Verde Islands.

August 6

- 00:00 UTC (8:00 p.m. AST August 5) near 14.5°N 33.2°W – Tropical Storm Alberto intensifies into a Category 1 hurricane west-southwest of the Cape Verde Islands.

August 8

- 12:00 UTC (8:00 a.m. EDT) near 28.2°N 74.2°W – Tropical Depression Four develops northeast of the Abaco Islands, Bahamas.

August 9

- 00:00 UTC (8:00 p.m. AST August 8) near 19.6°N 47.2°W – Hurricane Alberto weakens to a tropical storm over the mid-Atlantic.

August 10

- 00:00 UTC (8:00 p.m. AST August 9) near 24.8°N 52.6°W – Tropical Storm Alberto re-intensifies into a Category 1 hurricane over the mid-Atlantic.
- 00:00 UTC (8:00 p.m. EDT August 9) near 28.0°N 78.6°W – Tropical Depression Four attains its peak intensity with winds of 35 mph (55 km/h) and a minimum pressure of 1009 mbar (hPa; 29.81 inHg) north of Freeport, Bahamas.

August 11

- 12:00 UTC (8:00 a.m. EDT) near 29.6°N 76.5°W – Tropical Depression Four dissipates roughly 160 miles (260 km) east-northeast of Melbourne, Florida.
- 21:00 UTC (5:00 p.m. AST) near 33.8°N 58.3°W – Hurricane Alberto intensifies into a Category 2 hurricane about 385 mi (615 km) east-northeast of Bermuda.

August 12

- 09:00 UTC (5:00 a.m. AST) near 35.7°N 56.0°W – Hurricane Alberto intensifies into a Category 3 hurricane about 610 mi (980 km) south-southeast of Sable Island, Nova Scotia.
- 12:00 UTC (8:00 a.m. AST) near 35.9°N 55.3°W – Hurricane Alberto attains its peak intensity with winds of 125 mph (200 km/h) and a minimum pressure of 950 mbar (hPa; 28.05 inHg).

August 13

- 06:00 UTC (2:00 a.m. AST) – Hurricane Alberto weakens to a Category 2 hurricane over the northern Atlantic.
- 18:00 UTC (2:00 p.m. AST) – Hurricane Alberto weakens to a Category 1 hurricane over the northern Atlantic.
- 21:00 UTC (4:00 p.m. CDT) near 23.0°N 93.0°W – Tropical Depression Five develops in the Gulf of Mexico about 335 mi (535 km) southeast of Brownsville, Texas.

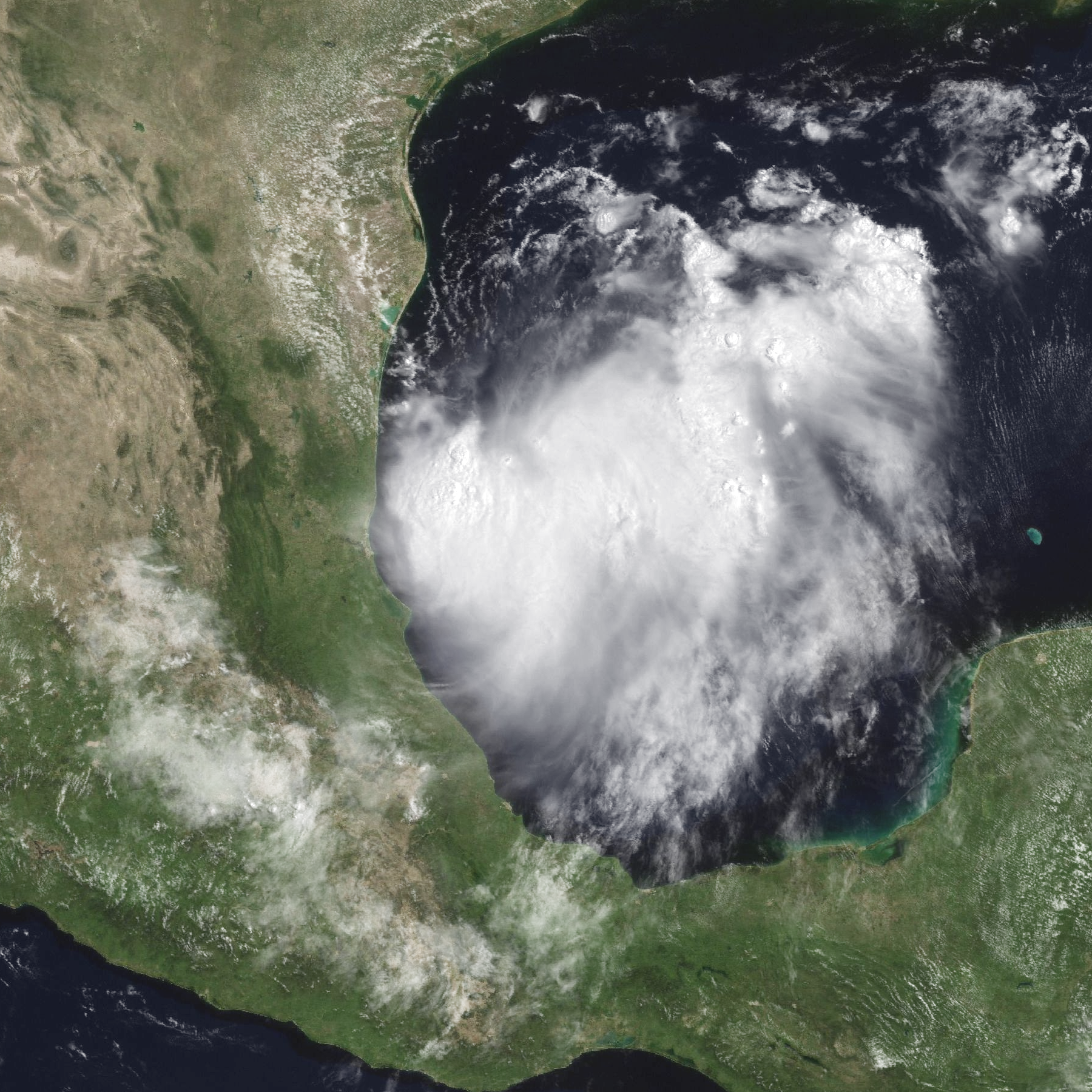
Tropical Storm Beryl, August 14, 2000

August 14

- 06:00 UTC (1:00 a.m. CDT) near 23.1°N 94.6°W – Tropical Depression Five intensifies into Tropical Storm Beryl.
- 06:00 UTC (2:00 a.m. AST) near 39.1°N 42.2°W – Hurricane Alberto weakens to a tropical storm over the northern Atlantic.

August 15

- 00:00 UTC (7:00 p.m. CDT August 14) near 24.1°N 97.0°W – Tropical Storm Beryl attains its peak intensity with winds of 50 mph (80 km/h) and a minimum pressure of 1007 mbar (hPa; 29.74 inHg).
- 07:00 UTC (2:00 a.m. CDT) near 24.6°N 97.9°W – Tropical Storm Beryl makes landfall about 35 mi (56 km) north of La Pesca, Tamaulipas, with winds of 50 mph (80 km/h).
- 12:00 UTC (7:00 a.m. CDT) near 24.9°N 98.6°W – Tropical Storm Beryl weakens to a tropical depression.
- 18:00 UTC (1:00 p.m. CDT) near 25.2°N 99.8°W – Tropical Depression Beryl dissipates over the mountains of northern Mexico near Monterrey, Nuevo León.

August 17

- 12:00 UTC (8:00 a.m. AST) near 14.2°N 51.9°W – Tropical Depression Six forms about 690 mi (1,100 km) east of the Lesser Antilles.

August 18

- 12:00 UTC (8:00 a.m. AST) near 16.2°N 55.4°W – Tropical Depression Six intensifies into Tropical Storm Chris east-northeast of Guadeloupe, and simultaneously attains its peak intensity with winds of 40 mph (65 km/h) and a minimum barometric pressure of 1008 mbar (hPa; 29.77 inHg).
- 15:00 UTC (11:00 a.m. AST) near 34.5°N 47.8°W – Tropical Storm Alberto attains hurricane strength for a third time about 1,100 mi (1,770 km) west-southwest of the westernmost Azores Islands.
- 18:00 UTC (2:00 p.m. AST) near 16.8°N 56.5°W – Tropical Storm Chris weakens to a tropical depression east of Antigua.

August 19

- 12:00 UTC (8:00 a.m. AST) – Hurricane Alberto re-intensifies into a Category 2 hurricane.
- 12:00 UTC (8:00 a.m. AST) near 18.3°N 60.4°W – Tropical Depression Chris dissipates east-northeast of Barbuda.
- 18:00 UTC (2:00 p.m. AST) near 12.0°N 44.5°W – Tropical Depression Seven develops about 1,035 miles (1,665 km) east of the Windward Islands.

August 20

- 0600 UTC (2:00 a.m. AST) near 13.3°N 46.8°W – Tropical Depression Seven intensifies into Tropical Storm Debby.

August 21

- 06:00 UTC (2:00 a.m. AST) – Hurricane Alberto weakens to a Category 1 hurricane.
- 06:00 UTC (2:00 a.m. AST) near 15.4°N 54.0°W – Tropical Storm Debby intensifies into a Category 1 hurricane.
- 12:00 UTC (8:00 a.m. AST) near 15.7°N 56.3°W – Hurricane Debby attains its peak winds of 85 mph (135 km/h).

August 22

- 03:00 UTC (11:00 p.m. AST August 21) near 17.1°N 60.9°W – Hurricane Debby attains its minimum barometric pressure of 991 mbar (hPa; 29.26 inHg).
- 06:00 UTC (2:00 a.m. AST) near 17.5°N 61.7°W – Hurricane Debby makes landfall on Barbuda with winds of 75 mph (120 km/h).
- 09:15 UTC (5:15 a.m. AST) near 17.9°N 62.8°W – Hurricane Debby makes landfall on St. Barthelemy with winds of 75 mph (120 km/h).
- 15:00 UTC (11:00 a.m. AST) near 18.5°N 64.4°W – Hurricane Debby makes landfall on Virgin Gorda with winds of 75 mph (120 km/h).

August 23

- 06:00 UTC (2:00 a.m. AST) near 50.7°N 36.8°W – Hurricane Alberto weakens to a tropical storm.
- 15:00 UTC (11:00 a.m. AST) near 54.6°N 34.1°W – Tropical Storm Alberto becomes extratropical about 780 mi (1255 km) south-southwest of Reykjavík, Iceland.
- 12:00 UTC (8:00 a.m. AST) near 19.8°N 69.7°W – Hurricane Debby weakens to a tropical storm about 140 mi (220 km) southeast of Grand Turk Island.

August 24

- 12:00 UTC (8:00 a.m. AST) near 19.5°N 77.0°W – Tropical Storm Debby weakens to a tropical depression about 135 mi (215 km) west-southwest of Santiago de Cuba in eastern Cuba.
- 15:00 UTC (11:00 a.m. AST) near 19.5°N 77.0°W – Tropical Depression Debby deteriorates into a tropical wave near the south coast of eastern Cuba.

=== September ===
Tropical Storm Ernesto on September 2, 2000

September 1

- 12:00 UTC (8:00 a.m. AST) near 14.8°N 45.2°W – Tropical Depression Eight develops about midway between the Lesser Antilles and Africa.

September 2

- 06:00 UTC (2:00 a.m. AST) near 16.2°N 49.5°W – Tropical Depression Eight intensifies into Tropical Storm Ernesto east of the Leeward Islands and simultaneously attains its peak intensity with winds of 40 mph (65 km/h) and a minimum pressure of 1008 mbar (hPa; 29.77 inHg).

September 3

- 18:00 UTC (2:00 p.m. AST) near 20.0°N 58.0°W – Tropical Storm Ernesto weakens to a tropical depression.
- 21:00 UTC (5:00 p.m. AST) near 20.0°N 59.0°W – Tropical Depression Ernesto dissipates into a tropical wave about 300 miles (480 km) east-northeast of the northern Leeward Islands.

September 8

- 18:00 UTC (1:00 p.m. CDT) near 27.5°N 93.5°W – Tropical Depression Nine develops in the Gulf of Mexico about 180 mi (300 km) south of Lake Charles, Louisiana.
- 21:00 UTC (4:00 p.m. CDT) near 28.0°N 93.5°W – Tropical Depression Nine attains its peak intensity with sustained winds of 30 mph (48 km/h) and a minimum barometric pressure of 1008 mbar (hPa; 29.77 inHg) south of Lake Charles, Louisiana.

September 9

- 10:00 UTC (4:00 a.m. CDT) near 29.9°N 93.9°W – Tropical Depression Nine makes landfall near Sabine Pass, Texas, and dissipates over land later that day.

September 10

- 18:00 UTC (2:00 p.m. EDT) near 30.9°N 70.9°W – A subtropical depression develops about 375 miles (605 km) west-southwest of Bermuda.

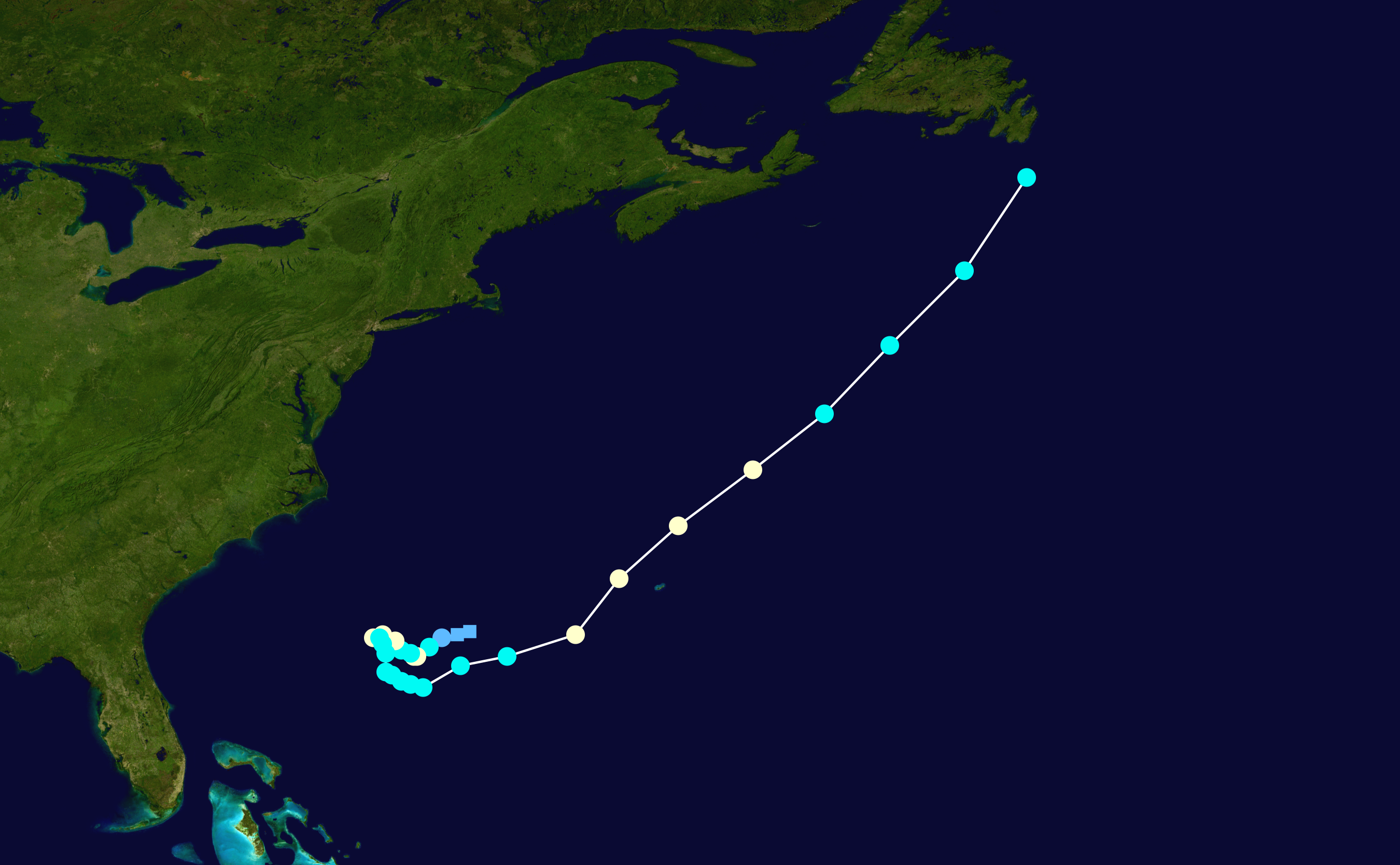
Storm track of Hurricane Florence, September 10–17, 2000

September 11

- 06:00 UTC (2:00 a.m. EDT) near 30.7°N 71.8°W – The subtropical storm acquires tropical characteristics and is re-classified as Tropical Depression Ten.
- 12:00 UTC (8:00 a.m. EDT) near 30.4°N 72.2°W – Tropical Depression Ten intensifies into Tropical Storm Florence.
- 18:00 UTC (2:00 p.m. EDT) near 30.1°N 72.6°W – Tropical Storm Florence intensifies into Category 1 hurricane about 489 mi (787 km) west-southwest of Bermuda.

September 12

- 06:00 UTC (2:00 a.m. EDT) near 30.2°N 72.8°W – Hurricane Florence weakens to a tropical storm.
- 18:00 UTC (2:00 p.m. EDT) near 30.6°N 73.3°W – Tropical Storm Florence re-intensifies into a hurricane.

September 13

- 12:00 UTC (8:00 a.m. EDT) near 30.7°N 73.8°W – Hurricane Florence weakens to a tropical storm.

September 14

- 12:00 UTC (7:00 a.m. CDT) near 19.8°N 87.3°W – Tropical Depression Eleven develops midway between Cozumel and Chetumal just off the Caribbean coast of Mexico.
- 21:00 UTC (4:00 p.m. CDT) near 20.3°N 87.9°W – Tropical Depression Eleven is inland over the Yucatan Peninsula about 65 mi (105 km) west-southwest of Cozumel.

September 15

- 12:00 UTC (8:00 a.m. AST) near 14.9°N 52.2°W – Tropical Depression Twelve develops about 580 mi (930 km) east of the Lesser Antilles.

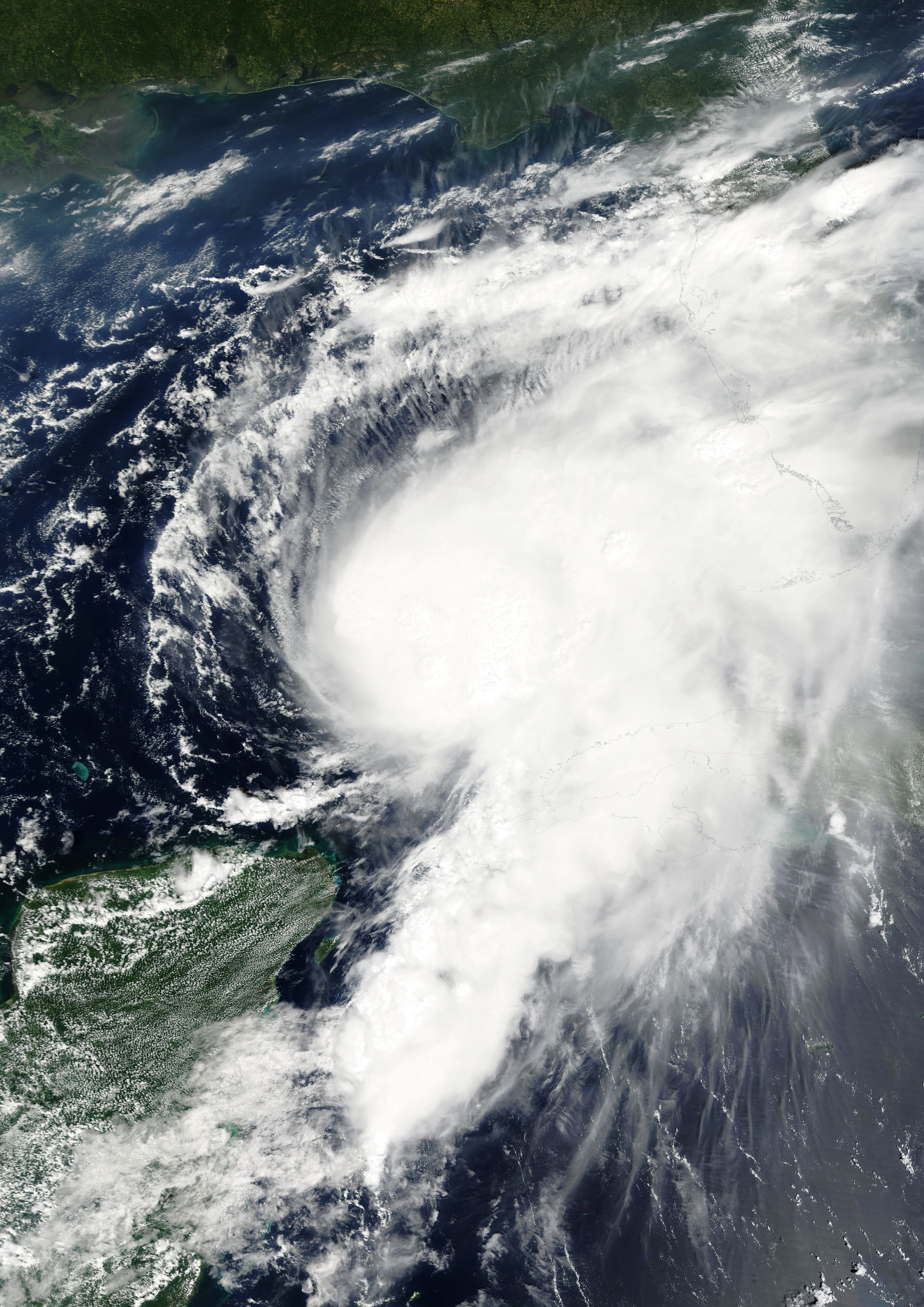
Hurricane Gordon on September 16, 2000

September 16

- 00:00 UTC (8:00 p.m. AST September 15) near 30.8°N 67.5°W – Tropical Storm Florence attains hurricane strength for a third time about 201 mi (324 km) west-southwest of Bermuda.
- 00:00 UTC (7:00 pm CDT September 15) near 22.5°N 86.7°W – Tropical Depression Eleven intensifies into Tropical Storm Gordon after emerging into the southeastern Gulf of Mexico.
- 17:00 UTC (1:00 p.m. AST) near 16.0°N 58.0°W – Tropical Depression Twelve degenerates into a tropical wave 230 mi (370 km) east of the Windward Islands.
- 18:00 UTC (2:00 p.m. EDT) near 36.1°N 61.8°W – Hurricane Florence attains its peak intensity northeast of Bermuda with winds of 80 mph (130 km/h) and a minimum pressure of 985 mbar (hPa; 29.01 inHg).

September 17

- 00:00 UTC (8:00 p.m. AST September 16) near37.9°N 59.5°W – Hurricane Florence again weakens to a tropical storm about 489 mi (787 km) northeast of Bermuda.
- 00:00 UTC (7:00 p.m. CDT September 16) near 25.2°N 85.5°W – Tropical Storm Gordon intensifies into a Category 1 hurricane about 265 mi (426 km) southwest of Tampa, Florida.
- 06:00 UTC (1:00 a.m. CDT) near 26.1°N 84.9°W – Hurricane Gordon attains its peak intensity about 190 mi (306 km) southwest of Tampa, with winds of 80 mph (130 km/h) and a minimum pressure of 981 mbar (hPa; 28.96 inHg).
- 18:00 UTC (1:00 p.m. CDT) near 22.5°N 86.7°W – Hurricane Gordon weakens to a tropical storm.
- 21:00 UTC (5:00 p.m. PM AST) near 47.2°N 52.3°W – Tropical Storm Florence begins to lose its identity about 45 mi (70 km) northeast of Cape Race, Newfoundland, and is absorbed later that day by the extratropical surface low associated with a short wave trough.

September 18

- 03:00 UTC (11:00 p.m. EDT September 17) near 29.3°N 83.2°W – Tropical Storm Gordon makes landfall just north of Cedar Key, Florida, with winds of 65 mph (105 km/h).
- 12:00 UTC (8:00 a.m. EDT) 31.0°N 82.4°W – Tropical Storm Gordon weakens to a tropical depression about 55 mi (89 km) west of Brunswick, Georgia.
- 18:00 UTC (2:00 p.m. EDT) – Tropical Depression Gordon transitions into an extratropical cyclone northwest of Savannah, Georgia, and two days later is absorbed by extratropical low.

September 19

- 23:00 UTC (7:00 p.m. EDT) near 19.9°N 80.7°W – Tropical Depression Twelve has re-generated about 60 mi (95 km) northeast of Grand Cayman Island.

September 21

- 06:00 UTC (1:00 a.m. CDT) near 24.9°N 86.6°W – Tropical Depression Twelve intensifies into Tropical Storm Helene south of Pensacola, Florida.
- 12:00 UTC (8:00 a.m. AST) near 11.5°N 23.0°W – Tropical Depression Thirteen develops about 200 mi (320 km) south of the Cape Verde Islands.

September 22

- 00:00 UTC (8:00 p.m. AST September 21) near 12.3°N 25.9°W – Tropical Depression Thirteen intensifies into Tropical Storm Isaac southwest of the Cape Verde Islands.
- 12:00 UTC (7:00 a.m. CDT) near 30.5°N 86.6°W – Tropical Storm Helene makes landfall near Fort Walton Beach, Florida with winds of 40 mph (65 km/h).
- 18:00 UTC (1:00 p.m. CDT) near 31.6°N 85.4°W – Tropical Storm Helene weakens to a tropical depression about 20 mi (32 km) north of Dothan, Alabama.

September 23

- 12:00 UTC (8:00 a.m. AST) near 14.3°N 33.2°W – Tropical Storm Isaac intensifies into a Category 1 hurricane over the eastern Atlantic Ocean.
- 18:00 UTC (2:00 p.m. AST) near 14.6°N 34.2°W – Hurricane Isaac intensifies into a Category 2 hurricane over the eastern Atlantic Ocean.
- 18:00 UTC (2:00 p.m. EDT) near 35.4°N 78.0°W – Tropical Depression Helene re-intensifies into a tropical storm over Goldsboro, North Carolina.

September 24

- 00:00 UTC (8:00 p.m. AST September 23) near 14.9°N 35.0°W – Hurricane Isaac intensifies into a Category 3 hurricane over the eastern Atlantic Ocean.

September 25

- 00:00 UTC (8:00 p.m. AST September 24) near 16.3°N 38.6°W – Hurricane Isaac weakens to a Category 2 hurricane over the central Atlantic Ocean.
- 06:00 UTC (2:00 a.m. AST) near 41.6°N 62.2°W – Tropical Storm Helene attains its peak intensity southwest of Sable Island, Nova Scotia with winds of 70 mph (110 km/h) and a minimum barometric pressure of 986 mbar (hPa; 29.03 inHg).
- 12:00 UTC (8:00 a.m. AST) near 11.2°N 29.6°W – Tropical Depression Fourteen develops about 400 mi (650 km) southwest of the Cape Verde Islands.
- 18:00 UTC (2:00 p.m. AST) near 46.1°N 48.8°W – Tropical Storm Helene is absorbed by a cold front east-southeast of the Avalon Peninsula, Newfoundland.

September 26

- 00:00 UTC (8:00 p.m. AST September 25) near 11.5°N 31.9°W – Tropical Depression Fourteen intensifies to Tropical Storm Joyce about 520 mi (925 km) west-southwest of the southwestern Cape Verde Islands.
- 12:00 UTC (8:00 a.m. AST) near 18.6°N 43.9°W – Hurricane Isaac weakens to a Category 1 hurricane over the central Atlantic Ocean.

Hurricanes Joyce and Isaac, September 27, 2000

September 27

- 06:00 UTC (2:00 a.m. AST) near 20.4°N 47.0°W – Hurricane Isaac re-intensifies into a Category 2 hurricane over the central Atlantic Ocean.
- 12:00 UTC (8:00 a.m. AST) near 12.4°N 38.8°W – Tropical Storm Joyce intensifies into a Category 1 hurricane about midway between Africa and the Lesser Antilles.

September 28

- 00:00 UTC (8:00 p.m. AST September 27) near 22.8°N 50.6°W – Hurricane Isaac re-intensifies into a Category 3 hurricane.
- 06:00 UTC (2:00 a.m. AST) near 12.2°N 42.5°W – Hurricane Joyce attains its peak intensity east of the Leeward Islands with winds of 90 mph (150 km/h) and a minimum pressure of 975 mbar (hPa; 28.79 inHg).
- 18:00 UTC (2:00 p.m. EDT) near 16.1°N 82.9°W – Tropical Depression Fifteen develops about 69 mi (110 km) north-northeast of Cabo Gracias a Dios, Honduras–Nicaragua.
- 18:00 UTC (2:00 p.m. AST) near 26.6°N 54.2°W – Hurricane Isaac intensifies into a Category 4 hurricane southeast of Bermuda, and simultaneously attains its peak intensity with winds of 140 mph (280 km/h) and a barometric pressure of 943 mbar (hPa; 27.84 inHg).

September 29

- 06:00 UTC (2:00 a.m. AST) near 29.7°N 55.9°W – Hurricane Isaac weakens to a Category 3 hurricane.
- 18:00 UTC (2:00 p.m. AST) near 32.9°N 55.9°W – Hurricane Isaac weakens to a Category 2 hurricane.
- 18:00 UTC (2:00 p.m. AST) near 10.5°N 50.1°W – Hurricane Joyce weakens to a tropical storm east-southeast of Barbados.
- 21:00 UTC (5:00 p.m. EDT) near 17.6°N 85.2°W – Tropical Depression Fifteen intensifies into Tropical Storm Keith about 300 mi (480 km) south of the western tip of Cuba.

September 30

- 06:00 UTC (2:00 a.m. AST) near 35.7°N 54.0°W – Hurricane Isaac weakens to a Category 1 hurricane.
- 12:00 UTC (8:00 a.m. EDT) near 18.2°N 86.4°W – Tropical Storm Keith intensifies into a Category 1 hurricane about 125 mi (205 km) east of Chetumal, Quintana Roo.
- 21:00 UTC (4:00 a.m. CDT) near 18.0°N 86.8°W – Hurricane Keith intensifies into a Category 2 hurricane about 105 mi (170 km) east-southeast of Chetumal.

=== October ===
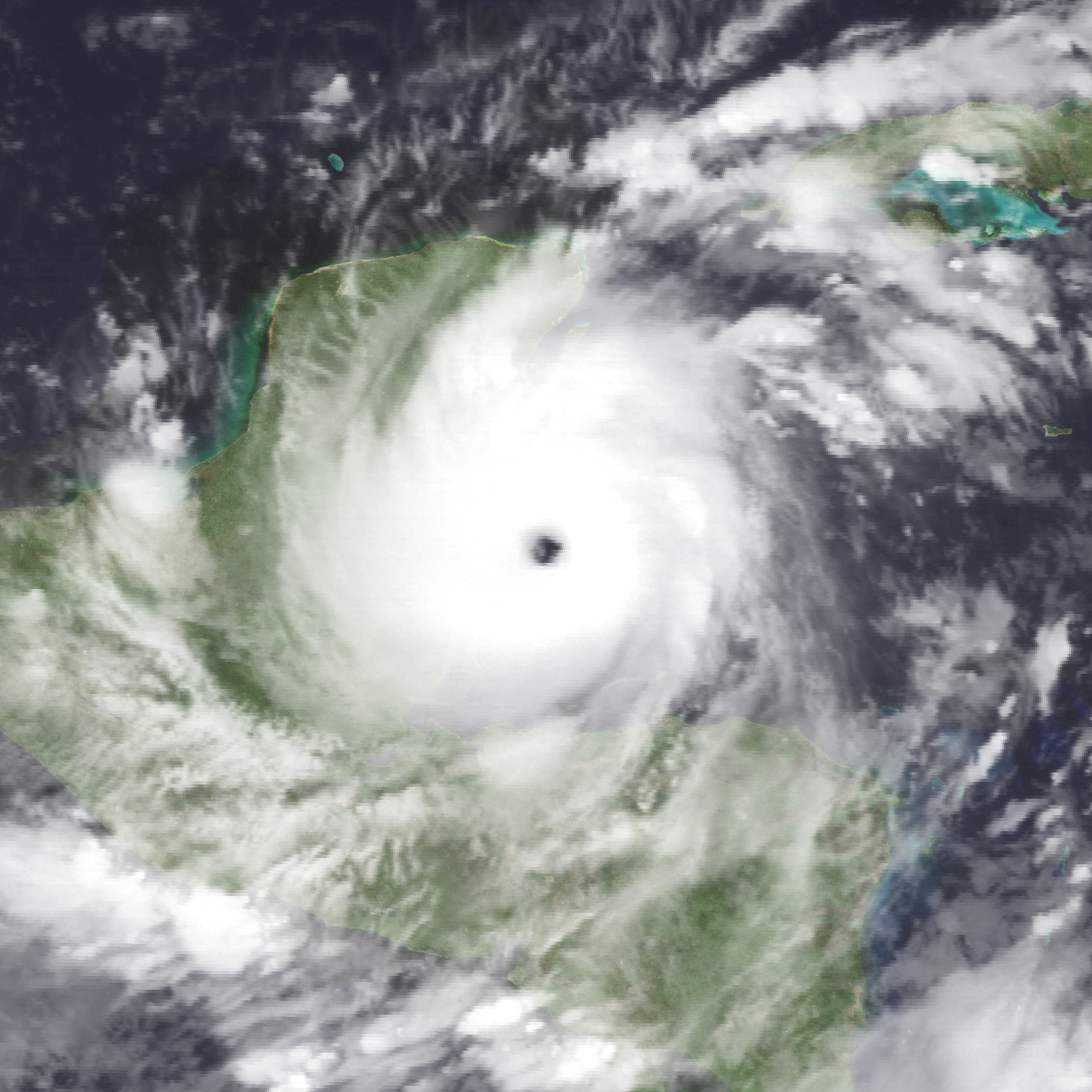
Hurricane Keith nearing landfall in Belize while at peak intensity on October 1, 2000

October 1

- 03:00 UTC (10:00 p.m. EDT September 30) near 18.1°N 87.1°W – Hurricane Keith intensifies into a Category 3 hurricane about 80 mi (130 km) east-southeast of Chetumal.
- 06:00 UTC (1:00 a.m. CDT) near 30.6°N 73.1°W – Hurricane Keith, meandering east-southeast of Chetumal, intensifies into a Category 4 hurricane.
- 06:00 UTC (2:00 a.m. AST) near 40.9°N 45.7°W – Hurricane Isaac weakens to a tropical storm.
- 07:00 UTC (2:00 a.m. CDT) near 17.9°N 87.3°W – Still east-southeast of Chetumal, Hurricane Keith attains its peak intensity with winds of 140 mph (220 km/h) and a minimum barometric pressure of 939 mbar (hPa; 27.73 inHg).
- 18:00 UTC (2:00 p.m. AST) near 43.5°N 39.5°W – Tropical Storm Isaac becomes an extratropical cyclone over the north-central Atlantic Ocean.
- 18:00 UTC (2:00 p.m. EDT) near 11.8°N 62.3°W – Tropical Storm Joyce weakens to a tropical depression about 45 mi (75 km) west-southwest of Grenada.
- 18:00 UTC (1:00 p.m. CDT) near 17.9°N 87.7°W – Hurricane Keith weakens to a Category 3 hurricane when its eyewall moves over Ambergris Caye and Caye Caulker off the coast of Belize.

October 2

- 06:00 UTC (1:00 a.m. CDT) near 17.6°N 87.8°W – Nearly stationary, Hurricane Keith weakens to a Category 2 hurricane.
- 12:00 UTC (7:00 a.m. CDT) near 17.7°N 87.8°W – Still nearly stationary, Hurricane Keith weakens to a Category 1 hurricane.
- 15:00 UTC (11:00 a.m. AST) near 12.0°N 67.5°W – Tropical Depression Joyce dissipates about 55 mi (90 km) east of Bonaire.
- 23:00 UTC (6:00 p.m. CDT) near 17.9°N 88.0°W – Hurricane Keith makes landfall on Ambergris Caye, with winds of 75 mph (120 km/h).

October 3

- 00:00 UTC (7:00 p.m. CDT October 2) near 17.9°N 88.0°W – Hurricane Keith weakens to a tropical storm 30 mi (50 km) northeast of Belize City, Belize.
- 03:00 UTC (10:00 p.m. CDT October 2) near 17.9°N 88.2°W – Tropical Storm Keith makes landfall about 29 mi (46 km;) north of Belize City.
- 12:00 UTC (7:00 a.m. CDT) near 18.3°N 88.8°W – Tropical Storm Keith weakens to a tropical depression over the Yucatan Peninsula, west of Chetumal.

Morning October 4

- 12:00 UTC (7:00 a.m. CDT) near 19.9°N 92.5°W – Tropical Depression Keith re-intensifies into a tropical storm upon moving over the Bay of Campeche.
- 12:00 UTC (8:00 a.m. EDT) near 29.0°N 81.4°W – A subtropical depression develops over Central Florida.

October 5

- 06:00 UTC (1:00 a.m. CDT) near 21.2°N 96.1°W – Tropical Storm Keith re-intensifies into a hurricane east-southeast of Tampico, Tamaulipas.
- 12:00 UTC (8:00 a.m. EDT) near 29.9°N 77.3°W – The subtropical depression intensifies and acquires tropical characteristics, becoming Tropical Storm Leslie, about 230 mi (370 km) east of St. Augustine, Florida.
- 18:00 UTC (1:00 p.m. CDT) near 22.6°N 97.9°W – Hurricane Keith makes landfall about 23 mi (37 km) north of Tampico, Tamaulipas, with winds of 90 mph (140 km/h).

October 6

- 00:00 UTC (7:00 p.m. CDT October 5) near 23.2°N 99.0°W – Hurricane Keith weakens to a tropical storm about 35 mi (60 km) south of Ciudad Victoria, Tamaulipas.
- 06:00 UTC (1:00 a.m. CDT) near 23.5°N 100.0°W – Tropical Storm Keith weakens to a tropical depression about 70 mi (110 km) west-southwest of Ciudad Victoria, and dissipates over northeastern Mexico later that day.
- 06:00 UTC (2:00 a.m. EDT) near 30.6°N 73.1°W – Tropical Storm Leslie attains its peak intensity about 500 mi (820 km) west-southwest of Bermuda with winds of 46 mph (74 km/h) and a minimum barometric pressure of 1006 mbar (hPa; 29.71 inHg).

October 7

- 18:00 UTC (2:00 p.m. EDT) near 37.4°N 66.2°W – Tropical Storm Leslie transitions into an extratropical cyclone about 374 mi (602 km) north-northwest of Bermuda.

October 15

- 12:00 UTC (8:00 a.m. EDT) near 30.0°N 71.2°W – A subtropical depression develops about 750 mi (1,200 km) east of Jacksonville, Florida.

October 16

- 00:00 UTC (8:00 p.m. EDT October 15) near 29.9°N 71.8°W – The nearly stationary subtropical depression strengthens into a subtropical storm east of Jacksonville.

Hurricane Michael on October 19, 2000

October 17

- 00:00 UTC (8:00 p.m. EDT October 16) near 29.9°N 71.1°W – Still nearly stationary east of Jacksonville, subtropical storm has acquired sufficient tropical characteristics to become Tropical Storm Michael.
- 15:00 UTC (11:00 a.m. EDT) near 30.2°N 71.0°W – Tropical Storm Michael has strengthened into a Category 1 hurricane about 400 mi (645 km) west-southwest of Bermuda.

October 19

- 12:00 UTC (8:00 a.m. AST) near 26.2°N 59.9°W – Tropical Depression Eighteen develops about 690 mi (1,100 km) southeast of Bermuda.
- 18:00 UTC (2:00 p.m. AST) near 44.0°N 58.5°W – Hurricane Michael intensifies into a Category 2 hurricane about 85 mi (135 km) east of Sable Island, Nova Scotia, and simultaneously attains its peak intensity with winds of 100 mph (155 km/h) and a minimum barometric pressure of 965 mbar (hPa; 28.5 inHg).
- 21:00 UTC (5:00 p.m. AST) near 46.0°N 57.0°W – Hurricane Michael begins an extratropical transition about 75 mi (120 km) southwest of Saint Pierre Island and makes landfall later that day along the south coast of Newfoundland as an extratropical system.

Tropical Storm Nadine on October 20, 2000

October 20

- 15:00 UTC (11:00 a.m. AST) near 30.8°N 57.0°W – Tropical Depression Eighteen strengthens into Tropical Storm Nadine about 470 mi (755 km) east of Bermuda.

October 21

- 00:00 UTC (8:00 p.m. AST October 20) near 32.4°N 55.2°W – Tropical Storm Nadine attains its peak intensity with winds at 60 mph (95 km/h) and a minimum barometric pressure of 999 mbar (hPa; 29.5 inHg) east of Bermuda.

October 22

- 03:00 UTC (11:00 p.m. AST October 21) near 36.3°N 49.9°W – Tropical Storm Nadine transitions into an extratropical cyclone about 750 miles (1,205 km) south-southeast of Cape Race, Newfoundland and is later absorbed by a cold front.

October 25

- 18:00 UTC (2:00 p.m. AST) near 24.5°N 71.7°W – A subtropical storm develops east of Cat Island, Bahamas.

October 29

- 02:00 UTC (10:00 p.m. AST October 28) near 41.7°N 61.6°W – The subtropical storm attains its peak intensity with winds of 65 mph (100 km/h) and a minimum pressure of 976 mbar (hPa; 28.82 inHg) while southwest of Sable Island, Nova Scotia.
- 06:00 UTC (2:00 a.m. AST) near 44.0°N 60.0°W – The subtropical storm transitions into an extratropical cyclone near Sable Island, and was later absorbed into a larger extratropical low.

=== November ===
- No tropical cyclones form in the Atlantic Ocean during the month of November.

November 30

- The 2000 Atlantic hurricane season officially ends.

== See also ==
- Timeline of the 2000 Pacific hurricane season
- Lists of Atlantic hurricanes
- Tropical cyclones in 2000
