= 2000 hurricane season =

2000 hurricane season may refer to:

- 2000 Atlantic hurricane season
- 2000 Pacific hurricane season
