= January 2000 North American blizzard =

Winter storm in North America

The Carolina Crusher
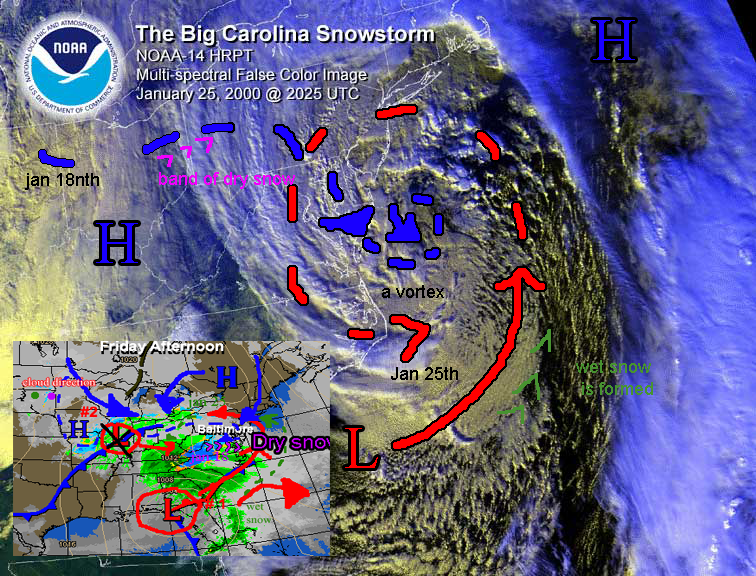

Meteorological history
- Formed: January 18, 2000
- Dissipated: January 30, 2000

Category 3 "Major" blizzard
- Regional snowfall index: 7.86 (NOAA)
- Max. snowfall: 20–30 in (51–76 cm) – Raleigh-Durham

Overall effects
- Damage: $800 million in North Carolina
- Areas affected: Eastern United States, Eastern Canada

The Carolina Crusher was one of the most powerful winter storms on record in parts of North Carolina, USA. The storm impacted the Greater Richmond Region on January 25th, 2000, causing thousands of power outages and leaving 11 in (280 mm) of snow in Richmond, Virginia, and 20.3 in (520 mm) at Raleigh-Durham International Airport before moving out into the Atlantic Ocean.

== Meteorological history ==
The storm began forming during a mild winter with below-average snowfall across much of the East Coast. Snow first started falling on Wednesday, January 19th, the major storm portion began on Friday, January 21st, 2000.

Initially, computer models suggested that an area of low-pressure would develop and, after getting energy from another low-pressure system in Canada, track up the East Coast. But over the weekend, some computer models no longer showed a strong storm. By Monday, January 24th, forecasters called only for "snow flurries" and "up to an inch of accumulation on the ground."^{[3]}

Some meteorologists considered classifying the event as part of the Big Storm, which was occurring in Canada at the time. The North American storm's low-pressure system originated over the northern Great Lakes, then entered over Appalachia where it strengthened considerably. Following this, it went into the North again to collide with the warm front that was approaching.

== Progression of the storm ==
A dip in the jet stream had created a trough, which caused rain in northern Florida and snow in Georgia. By the morning of the 24th, the storm was located in the northeastern Gulf of Mexico near Apalachicola, Florida. By the evening of the 24th, it was rapidly intensifying against the South Carolina coast. By Tuesday, January 25th, it was near Hatteras, North Carolina. The storm moved northeastward along the Atlantic Seaboard. Later in the day, it was located 80 miles east of Long Beach Island, New Jersey. It then began to weaken and by the morning of the 26th, it was located just east of Portland, Maine. The storm was poorly forecast because of other simultaneous storm events and the awkward buildup of two low-pressure systems.

=== Impact of the storm ===
Progress throughout the northern territories, including Pennsylvania, Delaware, and New Jersey, was significantly more damaging due to high winds, wet snow, sleet, and freezing rain. Snowfall rates of around 2 inches per hour were common during the first hours of this storm. Businesses, schools, airports, malls, and government offices were closed on January 25th due to weather.

In Pennsylvania, this was the most significant winter storm since the Blizzard of 1996. Most municipalities declared the standard snow emergencies where accidents, traffic hazards, and power outages occur. About 2,000 homes and businesses lost power, mainly in the Philadelphia area.

For Delaware, the change from wet snow to heavy, dry snow helped cut down on the amount of damage.

In addition to heavy snow, New Jersey also experienced wind gusts as strong as 60 mph along the shore, moderate coastal flooding, and drifts as high as 4 feet. The storm's intensity was lighter during the late morning and afternoon hours before strengthening again in the evening. The winter storm caused numerous accidents around the region.

In the southwestern territories, the wind was not as severe as in the north. In Richmond, Virginia, the snow fell as sleet then immediately turned into dry snow. The power outages came late the following week due to the rise in temperatures, with the snow already on the ground becoming wet snow.

Charlotte, North Carolina received almost a foot of snow in a 12-hour period. Raleigh, North Carolina and Annapolis, Maryland both had 20-24 inches, while Washington, D.C. had 14 inches. Areas that had less snowfall include Boston, Massachusetts and New York City, New York which both had 5 inches.

== Loss and damages ==
Raleigh and other areas of North Carolina were shut down for many days due to large amounts of snow remaining and poor road conditions.

There were at least three confirmed deaths from heart attacks shoveling snow in Pennsylvania. In Maryland, the National Weather Service reported at least eight deaths.

== Total accumulations ==
=== Pennsylvania and Delaware ===
County	Location	Amount
Monroe County	Saylorsburg	13 in (33 cm)
Monroe County	Long Pond	11 in (28 cm)
Monroe County	Bossardsville	10 in (25 cm)
Monroe County	East Stroudsburg	10 in (25 cm)
Monroe County	Scotia	7 in (18 cm)
Monroe County	Pocono Summit	6.5 in (17 cm)
Northampton County	Williams Township	14 in (36 cm)
Northampton County	Bath	7 in (18 cm)
Lehigh County	Allentown	7 in (18 cm)
Lehigh County	Lehigh Valley Airport	10 in (25 cm)
Berks County	Blue Marsh Lake	11 in (28 cm)
Berks County	Morgantown	10 in (25 cm)
Berks County	Vinemont	10 in (25 cm)
Berks County	Kutztown	8 in (20 cm)
Berks County	Lincoln Park	8 in (20 cm)
Chester County	Kennett Square	12 in (30 cm)
Chester County	West Barlborough Township	12 in (30 cm)
Chester County	Downingtown	11 in (28 cm)
Chester County	West Chester	11 in (28 cm)
Chester County	Coatesville	9 in (23 cm)
Chester County	Honey Brook	8 in (20 cm)
Chester County	Glenmoore	8 in (20 cm)
Montgomery County	Willow Grove	14 in (36 cm)
Montgomery County	Wynnewood	12 in (30 cm)
Montgomery County	Norristown	11.5 in (29 cm)
Montgomery County	King Prussia	11 in (28 cm)
Montgomery County	Pottstown	7 in (18 cm)
Bucks County	Chalfont	13.6 in (35 cm)
Bucks County	Furlong	12.5 in (32 cm)
Bucks County	Doylestown	12 in (30 cm)
Bucks County	Springtown	9 in (23 cm)
Bucks County	Langhorne	9 in (23 cm)
Delaware County	Springfield	11 in (28 cm)
Delaware County	Philadelphia International Airport	9 in (23 cm)
New Castle County	New Castle County Airport	10 in (25 cm)
Kent County	Woodside	11 in (28 cm)
Kent County	Dover	11 in (28 cm)
Kent County	Milford	9 in (23 cm)
Kent County	Viola	8 in (20 cm)
Sussex County	Georgetown	8.5 in (22 cm)
Sussex County	Seaford	8 in (20 cm)
Sussex County	Lewes	6.5 in (17 cm)
Sussex County	Laurel	6 in (15 cm)
Sussex County	Rehoboth Beach	5 in (13 cm)

=== New Jersey ===
County	Location	Amount
Sussex County	High Point	15 in (38 cm)
Sussex County	Culver Lake	14.7 in (37 cm)
Sussex County	Wantage	13.5 in (34 cm)
Sussex County	Sparta	9.5 in (24 cm)
Sussex County	Sussex	8 in (20 cm)
Warren County	Phillipsburg	12 in (30 cm)
Warren County	Allamuchy	11 in (28 cm)
Morris County	Oak Ridge	12 in (30 cm)
Morris County	Long Valley	11 in (28 cm)
Morris County	Whippany	9 in (23 cm)
Morris County	Rockaway	9 in (23 cm)
Morris County	Madison	6 in (15 cm)
Hunterdon County	White House Station	13 in (33 cm)
Hunterdon County	Califon	11.5 in (29 cm)
Hunterdon County	Flemington	10 in (25 cm)
Hunterdon County	Wertsville	10 in (25 cm)
Somerset County	Neshanic	10.5 in (27 cm)
Somerset County	Pottersville	10 in (25 cm)
Somerset County	Branchburg	9 in (23 cm)
Somerset County	Somerville	9 in (23 cm)
Middlesex County	New Brunswick	6 in (15 cm)
Middlesex County	Woodbridge	6 in (15 cm)
Mormouth County	Ocean Grove	7 in (18 cm)
Mormouth County	Manasquan	7 in (18 cm)
Mormouth County	Howell	6 in (15 cm)
Mormouth County	Union Beach	6 in (15 cm)
Mercer County	Washington's Crossing	10 in (25 cm)
Mercer County	Princeton	8 in (20 cm)
Mercer County	Hightstown	8 in (20 cm)
Burlington County	Moorestown	13 in (33 cm)
Burlington County	Lumberton	10 in (25 cm)
Burlington County	Marlton	10 in (25 cm)
Burlington County	Mount Laurel	9 in (23 cm)
Burlington County	Bordentown	7 in (18 cm)
Ocean County	Brick	10 in (25 cm)
Ocean County	Brant Beach	9 in (23 cm)
Ocean County	Jackson	8 in (20 cm)
Camden County	Gloucester City	13 in (33 cm)
Camden County	Somerdale	11 in (28 cm)
Camden County	Pennsauken	10 in (25 cm)
Camden County	Cherry Hill	8 in (20 cm)
Gloucester County	Sewell	13 in (33 cm)
Gloucester County	Mullica Hill	13 in (33 cm)
Gloucester County	Swedesboro	11.5 in (29 cm)
Salem County	Deepwater	10.3 in (26 cm)
Cumberland County	Seabrook	9 in (23 cm)
Cumberland County	Millville	8 in (20 cm)
Cumberland County	Vineland	7 in (18 cm)
Atlantic County	Pomona	10 in (25 cm)
Atlantic County	Estell Manor	9 in (23 cm)
Atlantic County	Atlantic City International Airport	8.3 in (21 cm)
Cape May County	North Wildwood	10 in (25 cm)
Cape May County	Cape May City	8.5 in (22 cm)
Cape May County	Cape May Courthouse	8 in (20 cm)

=== North Carolina ===
Location	Amount
Gastonia and New Bern	2 in (51 mm)
Jacksonville	4 in (100 mm)
Salisbury and Wilmington	5 in (130 mm)
Winston-Salem	7 in (180 mm)
Rocky Mount and Tarboro	8 in (200 mm)
Kannapolis	9 in (230 mm)
Charlotte, Greensboro, and Smithfield	10 in (250 mm)
Carrboro	14 in (360 mm)
Asheboro	15 in (380 mm)
Sanford, Chapel Hill, and Fayetteville	16 in (410 mm)
Durham	18 in (460 mm)
Monroe	20 in (510 mm)
Raleigh	24 in (610 mm)

The Outer Banks received rain with the system and the mountains did not receive any precipitation.

== Sources ==
- "Second Guessing Mother Nature: Forecasting the Surprise Snow of January 2000". NASA Earth Observatory. NASA.
- "January 2000" (PDF). Storm Data and Unusual Weather Patterns. National Weather Service.
