= 2000 Atlantic hurricane season =

Hurricane season in the Atlantic Ocean

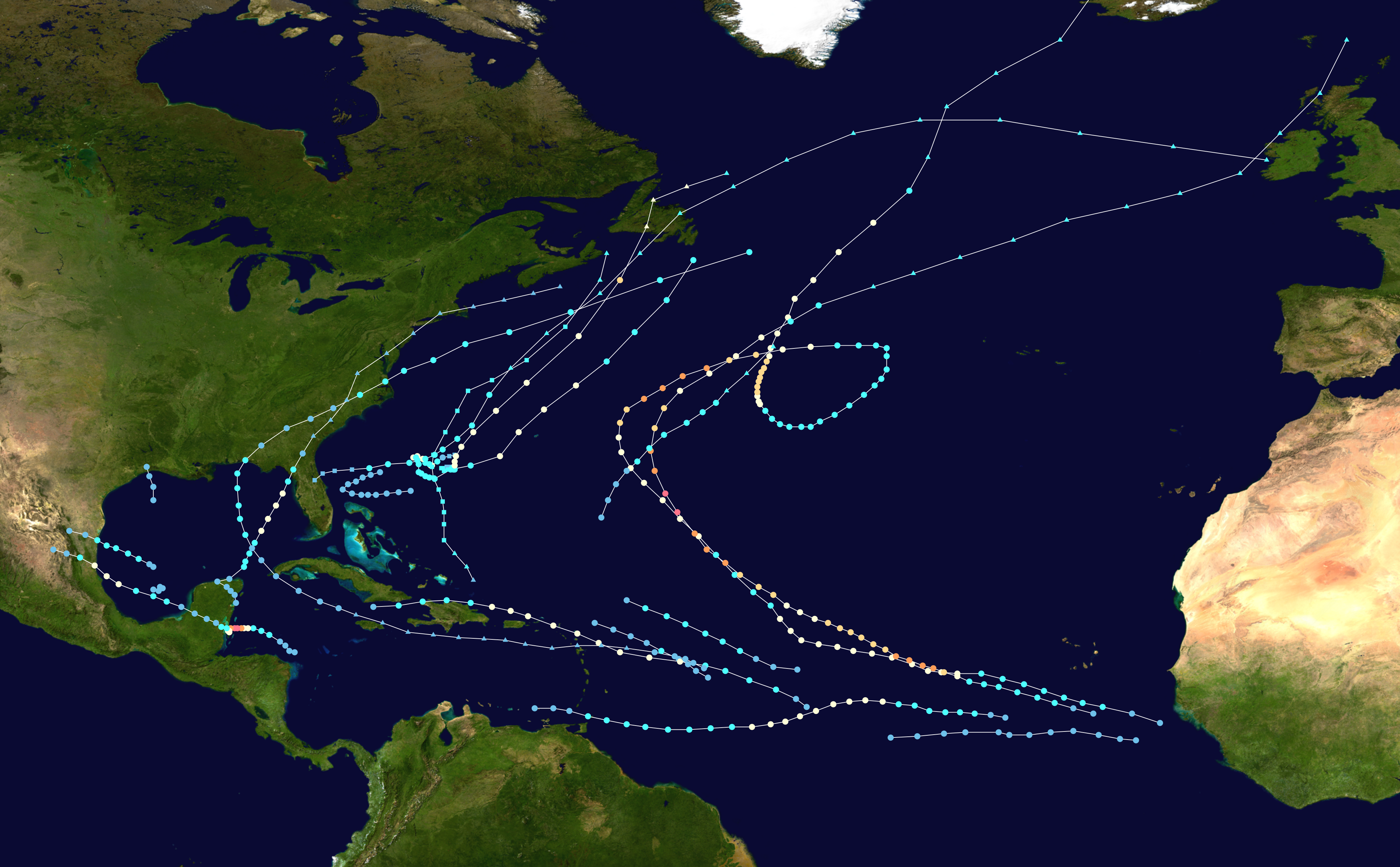
- Season summary map

Seasonal boundaries
- First system formed: June 7, 2000
- Last system dissipated: October 29, 2000

Strongest storm
- Name: Keith
  - Maximum winds: 140 mph (220 km/h) (1-minute sustained)
  - Lowest pressure: 939 mbar (hPa; 27.73 inHg)

Seasonal statistics
- Total depressions: 19
- Total storms: 15
- Hurricanes: 8
- Major hurricanes (Cat. 3+): 3
- ACE: 119
- Total fatalities: 105 total
- Total damage: $1.29 billion (2000 USD)

Related articles
- Timeline of the 2000 Atlantic hurricane season; 2000 Pacific hurricane season; 2000 Pacific typhoon season; 2000 North Indian Ocean cyclone season

The 2000 Atlantic hurricane season was a fairly active hurricane season, but featured the latest first named storm in a hurricane season since 1992. The hurricane season officially began on June 1, and ended on November 30. It was slightly above average due to a La Niña weather pattern, although most of the storms were weak. The first cyclone, Tropical Depression One, developed in the southern Gulf of Mexico on June 7 and dissipated after an uneventful duration. However, it would be almost two months before the first named storm, Alberto, formed near Cape Verde; Alberto also dissipated with no effects on land. Several other tropical cyclones—Tropical Depression Two, Tropical Depression Four, Chris, Ernesto, Nadine, and an unnamed subtropical storm—did not impact land. Four additional storms—Tropical Depression Nine, Florence, Isaac, and Joyce—minimally affected land areas.

The most significant storm of the season was Hurricane Keith, which caused extensive damage in Central America. After remaining nearly stationary offshore, Keith moved inland over the Yucatán Peninsula and later made a second landfall in Mexico at hurricane intensity. It caused $319 million (2000 USD) in damage and 40 fatalities, mostly in Belize. The precursor to Tropical Storm Leslie brought severe flooding to South Florida, which losses reaching $950 million (2000 USD). Hurricane Gordon and Tropical Storm Helene both caused moderate damage in the Southeastern United States, mainly in Florida. Tropical Storm Beryl caused minor damage in Mexico and Hurricane Debby resulted in less than $1 million (2000 USD) in damage in the Greater and Lesser Antilles. Hurricane Michael brought widespread effects to Atlantic Canada, though a specific damage toll is unknown.

Of the tropical cyclones that made landfall in the United States, none were higher than tropical storm status at the time of landfall.

== Seasonal forecasts ==
Predictions of tropical activity in the 2000 season
Source	Date	Named storms	Hurricanes	Major hurricanes
CSU	Average (1950–2000)	9.6	5.9	2.3
NOAA	Average	11	6	2
CSU	April 7, 2000	11	7	3
CSU	June 7, 2000	12	8	4
CSU	August 4, 2000	11	7	3
NOAA	August 10, 2000	11	7	3
Actual activity		15	8	3

Forecasts of hurricane activity are issued before each hurricane season by noted hurricane expert Dr. William M. Gray and his associates at Colorado State University (CSU), and separately by forecasters with the U.S. Government's National Oceanic and Atmospheric Administration (NOAA). According to CSU, the average season between 1950 and 2000 had 9.6 tropical storms, 5.9 hurricanes, and 2.3 major hurricanes (storms exceeding Category 3 on the Saffir–Simpson hurricane scale). A normal season, as defined by NOAA, has 9 to 12 named storms, of which five to seven reach hurricane strength and one to three become major hurricanes.

Noted hurricane expert Dr. William M. Gray on April 7 predicted eleven named storms, with eight reaching hurricane strength and three of the eight reaching Category 3 strength. The prediction issued on June 7 was similar, increasing the named storms to twelve, eight hurricanes, and four major hurricanes. On May 10, NOAA issued a season outlook, which gave the indication of an above-average season. According to NOAA, the global scale atmospheric circulation pattern which was taking place was conducive to an above-average hurricane season. However, La Niña was present it the Eastern Pacific, which was a factor in the activity in the season. NOAA issued a 75% chance of above average activity. After the season started on June 1, CSU issued a mid-season forecast on August 4, which predicted 11 named storms, 7 hurricanes, and 3 major hurricanes. Six days after the CSU prediction, NOAA also released a mid-season outlook, forecasting exactly the same amount of activity, 11 named storms, 7 hurricanes, and 3 major hurricanes. With a 75% chance of above-average activity, there was an elevated risk of landfalling hurricanes.

== Seasonal summary ==
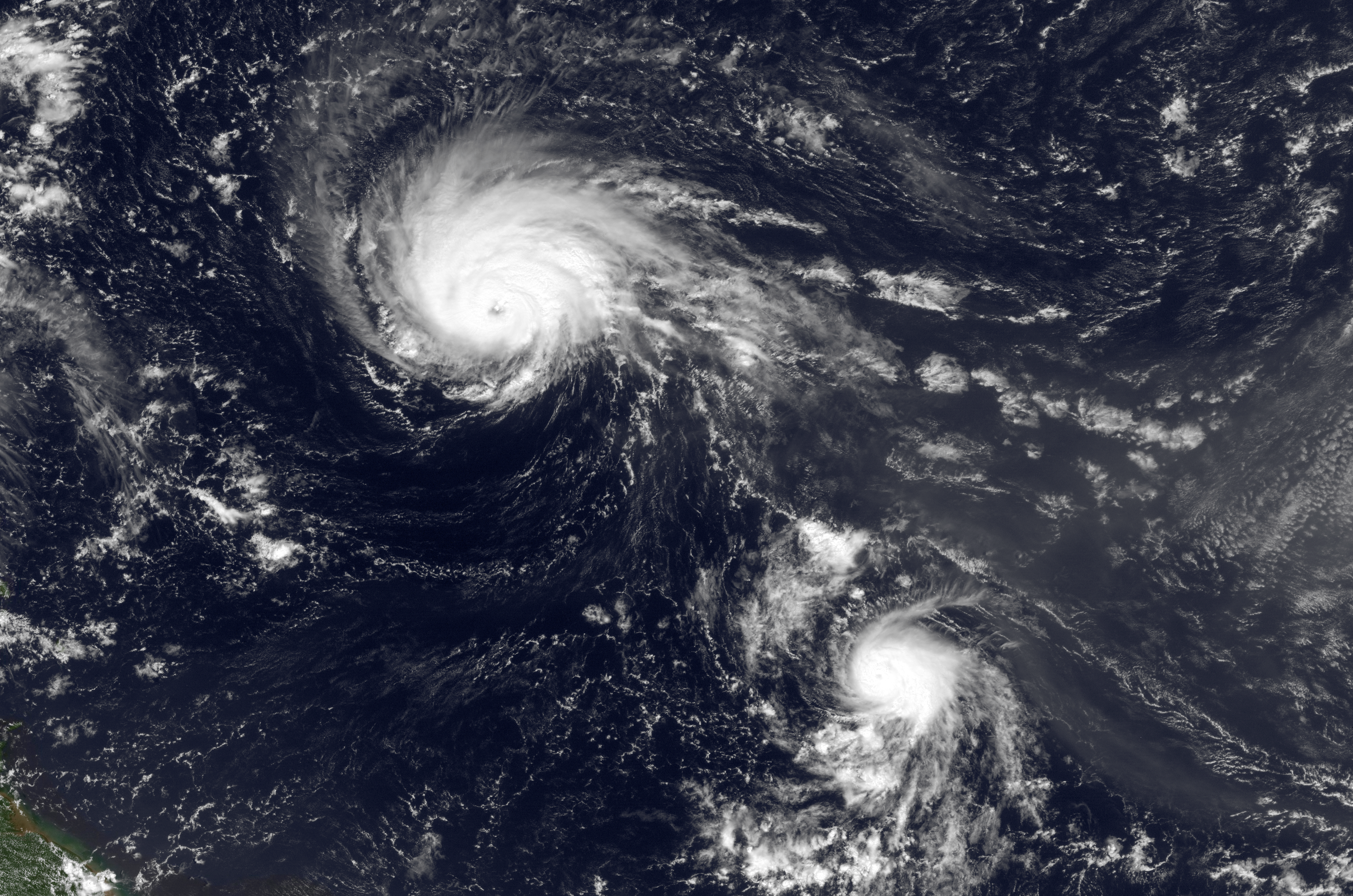
Hurricanes Isaac and Joyce on September 27, 2000

The Atlantic hurricane season officially began on June 1, 2000. It was an above average season in which 19 tropical cyclones formed. Fifteen depressions attained tropical storm status, and eight of these attained hurricane status. Three hurricanes further intensified into major hurricanes. The season was above average most likely because of an ongoing La Niña in the Pacific Ocean. Three hurricanes and two tropical storms made landfall during the season and caused 77 deaths and $1.2 billion in damage (2000 USD). Hurricane Florence and Isaac and Tropical Storm Leslie also caused damage and fatalities, though none of the three made landfall. The last storm of the season, an unnamed subtropical storm, dissipated on October 29, over a month before the official end of hurricane season on November 30.

Tropical cyclogenesis first occurred in the month of June, with two tropical depressions developing in the Atlantic. However, no tropical cyclones developed in the month of July, the first phenomenon since 1993. In August, five tropical cyclones developed, most notably, Hurricane Alberto. September was more active, with seven named storms forming; that month featured Hurricane Keith, the strongest system of the 2000 Atlantic hurricane season. With seven named storms forming in September, this made it the most active September on record at the time. This record was surpassed two years later when eight storms formed in September. In addition, a quick succession of eight storms occurred in September, and lasted into early October. Six tropical cyclones existed in October and one additional subtropical storm developed in the last week of the month. Following an active October, no tropical cyclogenesis occurred in November, which is the final month of the season.

A series of six high-latitude tropical cyclones affected Europe as an extratropical cyclone, contributing to high rainfall and events across the continent in September and October 2000.

The season's activity was reflected with an accumulated cyclone energy (ACE) rating of 119. ACE is, broadly speaking, a measure of the power of the hurricane multiplied by the length of time it existed, so storms that last a long time, as well as particularly strong hurricanes, have high ACEs. ACE is only calculated for full advisories on tropical systems at or exceeding 34 knots (39 mph; 63 km/h) or tropical storm strength. Subtropical cyclones, including the unnamed storm as well as the initial stages of Florence, Leslie, and Michael, are excluded from the total.

== Systems ==
=== Tropical Depression One ===
- Tropical depression (SSHWS)
- Duration: June 7 – June 8
- Peak intensity: 30 mph (45 km/h) (1-min); 1008 mbar (hPa)

A tropical wave exited the west coast of Africa on May 23 and tracked westward across the Atlantic Ocean and the Caribbean. The system had entered into the Gulf of Mexico on June 6. Another tropical wave merged with the system on June 7 and developed into a low-pressure area in the Gulf of Mexico. Later that day, the National Hurricane Center began classifying the system as Tropical Depression One. Though the depression was predicted to intensify into a tropical storm, strong wind shear produced by an upper-anticyclone prevented significant strengthening.

The depression tracked slowly and erratically through the Gulf of Mexico. By late on June 8, a reconnaissance plane flight indicated that the depression had degenerated into a low-pressure area. The remnants of the depression produced gusty winds and light to moderate rainfall along the Gulf Coast of Mexico; some areas in the state of Tamaulipas reported precipitation amounts as high as 7.18 inches (182 mm). In addition, heavy precipitation was reported in south-central Texas.

=== Tropical Depression Two ===
- Tropical depression (SSHWS)
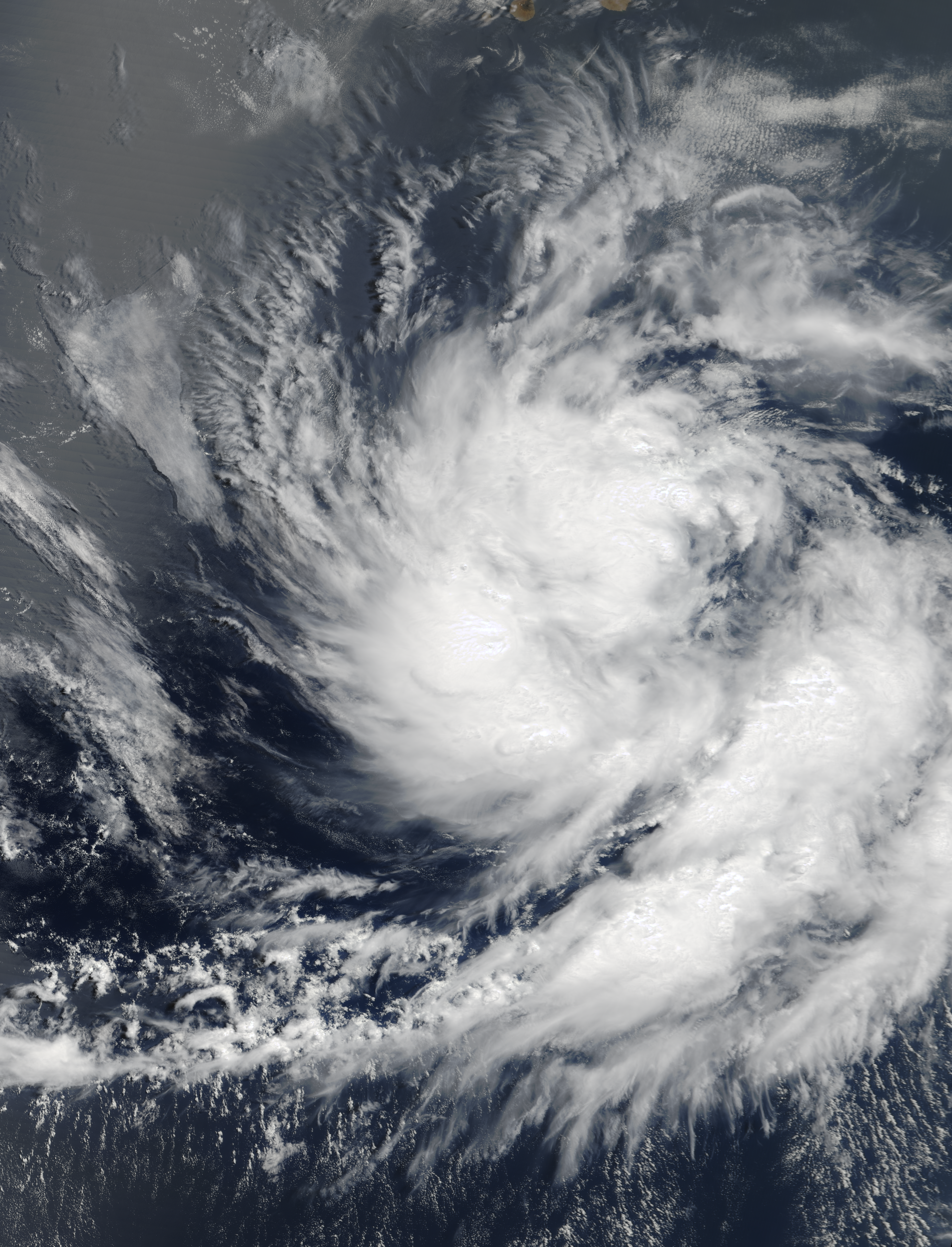
- Duration: June 23 – June 25
- Peak intensity: 35 mph (55 km/h) (1-min); 1008 mbar (hPa)

A tropical wave emerged off the coast of Africa and quickly developed into Tropical Depression Two on June 23. Although it was well-organized, the National Hurricane Center did not initiate advisories on the depression until 1500 UTC on June 24, since it operationally appeared that a surface circulation did not exist until then. However, the depression was less organized after the National Hurricane Center began advisories. Having formed at 19.8°W, it was one of the easternmost developing tropical cyclones in the month of June, even further east than Tropical Storm Ana in 1979 and Tropical Depression Two in 2003. Though light wind shear and marginally warm sea surface temperatures were in the path of the depression, no significant intensification occurred as it tracked generally westward. The depression began encountering a stable air mass, and degenerated back into a tropical wave on June 25.

=== Hurricane Alberto ===
- Category 3 hurricane (SSHWS)
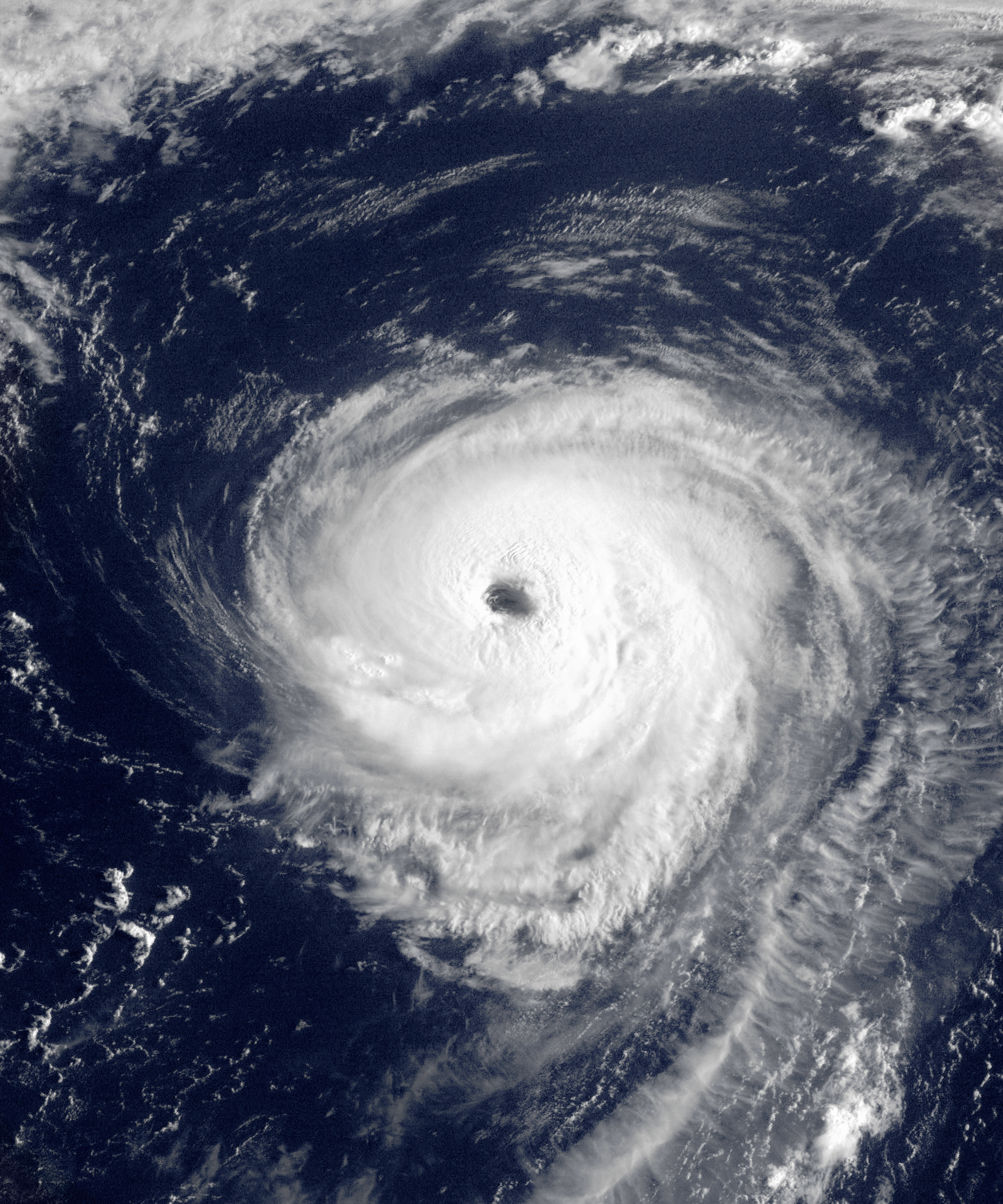
- Duration: August 3 – August 23
- Peak intensity: 125 mph (205 km/h) (1-min); 950 mbar (hPa)

A well-developed tropical wave was observed in satellite imagery over central Africa on July 30. The system tracked westward and emerged into the Atlantic Ocean on August 3. Thereafter, the system rapidly organized, and developed into Tropical Depression Three at 1800 UTC that day. The depression moved west-northwestward and strengthened into Tropical Storm Alberto early on August 4. While briefly turning westward on August 6, Alberto reached hurricane status. It tracked west-northwestward, and by early the following day, the storm reached an initial peak with winds of 90 mph (145 km/h). Shortly thereafter, Alberto re-curved northwestward. Wind shear then increased, which caused Alberto to weaken to a tropical storm on August 9. However, it quickly re-strengthened, and early on August 10, Alberto was upgraded to a hurricane again. Due to a break in a subtropical ridge, Alberto gradually curved northward and north-northeastward between August 11 and 12. While turning northeastward, Alberto strengthened into a Category 3 hurricane, becoming the first major hurricane of the season. By 1200 UTC on August 12, Alberto attained its peak intensity with winds of 125 mph (200 km/h).

Increasing upper-level westerlies caused Alberto to weaken as it moved east-northeastward, with the cyclone losing most of its convection. Early on August 14, Alberto was downgraded to a tropical storm. A westerly trough that had been guiding Alberto outran the storm, and strong ridging developed to the north and west. As a result, Alberto turned southward on August 15, southwestward on August 16, and then to the west on August 17. While curving northwestward and then northward, Alberto began to re-strengthen, and was upgraded to a hurricane for the third occasion on August 18. Alberto reached a third peak intensity as a Category 2 hurricane with winds of 105 mph (170 km/h) on August 20. After weakening back to a Category 1 hurricane, Alberto had completed a cyclonic loop, which it had started on August 13. Due to decreasing ocean temperatures, Alberto was again downgraded to a tropical storm on August 23 as it accelerated northeastward. Six hours later, Alberto transitioned into an extratropical cyclone while centered about 780 miles (1,260 km) south-southwest of Reykjavík, Iceland.

Dakar, Senegal, received 25 mm (0.98 in) of rain as the pre-Alberto tropical wave passed over the city. Some swells were reported along the east coast of the United States a few days after the storm's recurvature. In Iceland, it was estimated that winds of at least tropical storm force were experienced there. Hurricane Alberto completed the largest loop ever observed over the Atlantic Ocean, spanning approximately 5 degrees latitude by 8 degrees longitude. The storm is currently the ninth longest-lived storm in the Atlantic Ocean (lasting 19.75 days), and is also the second longest-lived Atlantic storm during August (the longest lived is the 1899 Hurricane San Ciriaco). Also, Alberto is the farthest-travelling in the Atlantic (travelling 6,500 miles), being able to retain tropical characteristics at an unusually high latitude, up to 53˚N. The last storm to do so was Hurricane Frances in 1980.

=== Tropical Depression Four ===
- Tropical depression (SSHWS)
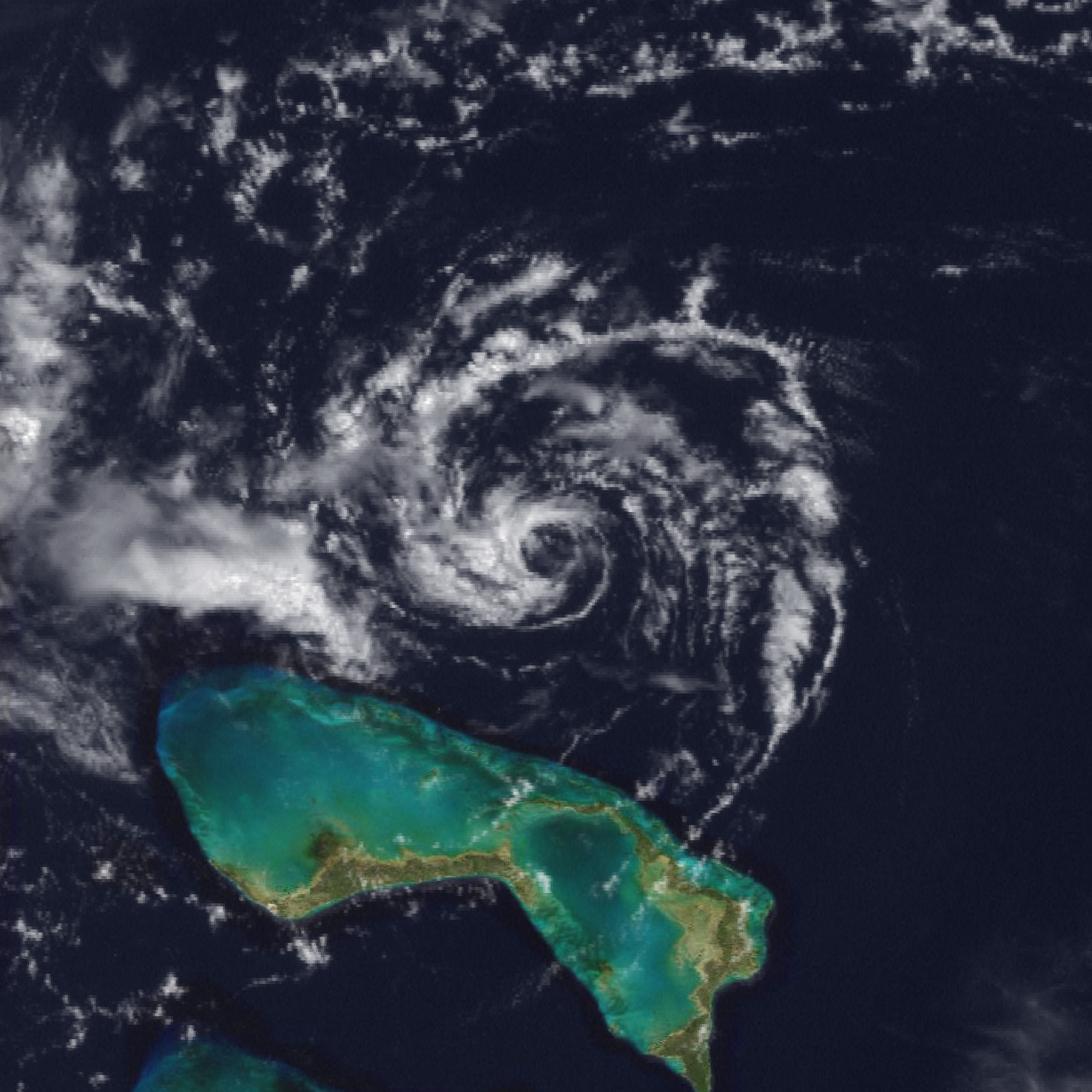
- Duration: August 8 – August 11
- Peak intensity: 35 mph (55 km/h) (1-min); 1009 mbar (hPa)

An area of low pressure detached from a frontal zone on August 4 and moved southwestward. After developing a minimal amount of deep convection, an Air Force Reserve Command reconnaissance aircraft found a well-defined low-level circulation on August 8. The depression then moved westward without intensifying for two days. On August 10, the depression was about 80 miles (130 km) east of Cape Canaveral, Florida when it abruptly turned northeastward in advance of a deep-layer trough over the eastern United States. After minimal strengthening, the depression dissipated to the north of the Bahamas on August 11. While a tropical cyclone, a reconnaissance flight reported winds of 56 mph (90 km/h). However, it was not upgraded to a tropical storm since the aforementioned wind speed did not represent the intensity of the depression.

=== Tropical Storm Beryl ===
- Tropical storm (SSHWS)
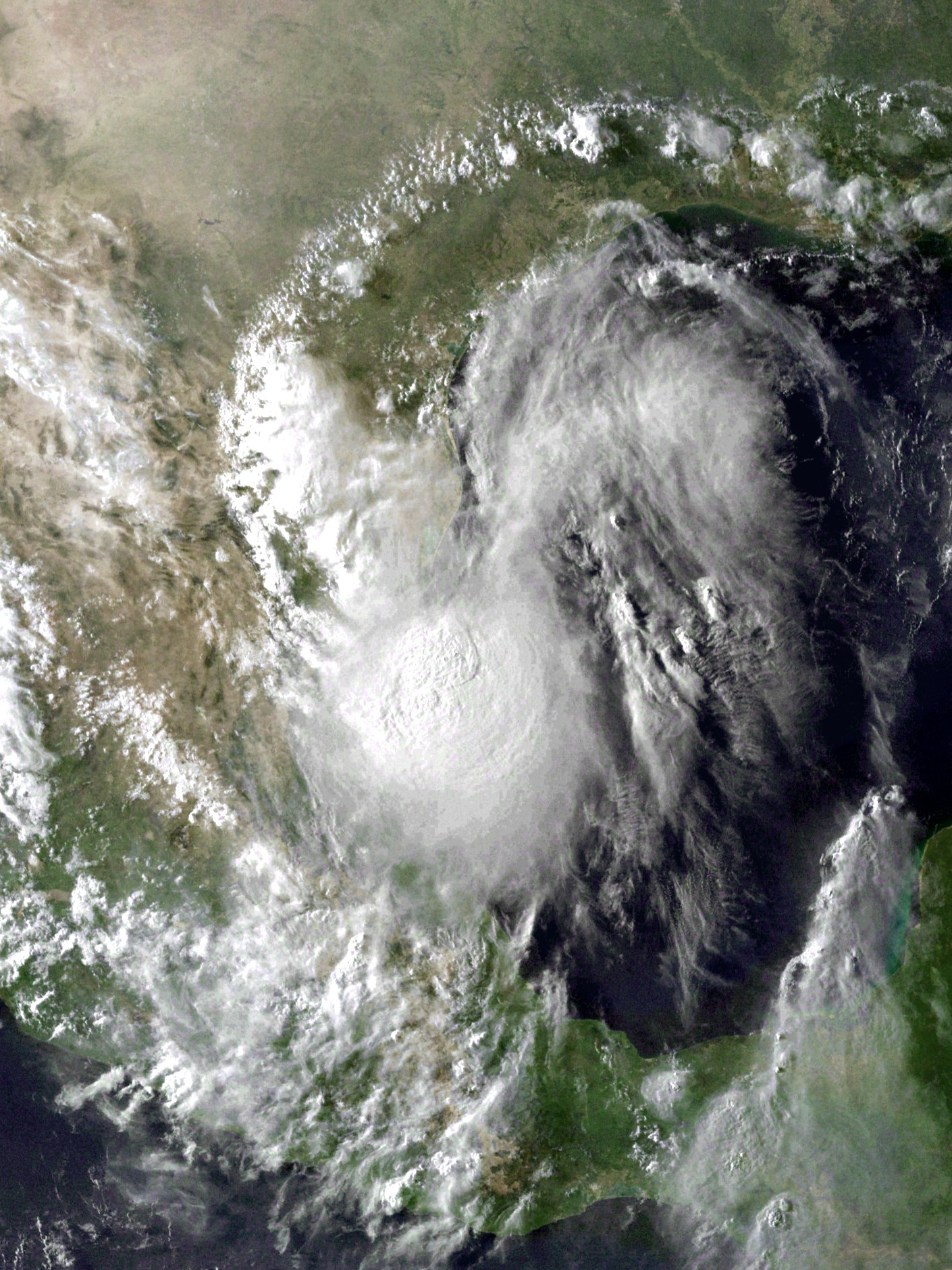
- Duration: August 13 – August 15
- Peak intensity: 50 mph (85 km/h) (1-min); 1007 mbar (hPa)

A tropical wave emerged from the coast of Africa with a closed circulation on August 3. The system split, with the northern portion developing into Hurricane Alberto, while the southern portion of the wave continued westward. Minimal deep convection persisted until the wave reached the Yucatán Peninsula on August 12. After emerging into the Gulf of Mexico on the following day, satellite imagery and a reconnaissance aircraft flight indicated that the system developed into Tropical Depression Five at 1800 UTC. Early on August 13, the depression intensified into Tropical Storm Beryl. Despite predictions for Beryl to reach hurricane status, it remained disorganized and peaked as a 50 mph (80 km/h) tropical storm. By 07:00 UTC on August 15, Beryl made landfall about 35 miles (56 km) north of La Pesca, Tamaulipas, in northeastern Mexico, with winds of 50 mph (80 km/h). Beryl quickly weakened inland, and was downgraded to a tropical depression five hours after moving inland. Shortly thereafter, Beryl dissipated while centered near Monterrey.

Ahead of Beryl's landfall, hurricane warnings were issued from Baffin Bay, Texas southward to La Pesco, Tamaulipas, with tropical storm warnings farther south to Tampico. In low-lying rural areas near the mouth of the Rio Grande, about 20,000 residents were urged to seek shelter, as the inadequate drainage in these areas make them in danger to severe flooding. Authorities in southern Texas filled 20,000 sandbags along the shores, and closed government offices. Residents nailed plywood on windows, parks were temporarily closed, and documents were transferred to waterproof storage areas. In Mexico, a rainfall total of 6.3 in (160 mm) within a period of 24 hours was measured in San Gabriel, Tamaulipas. Residents from two low-lying fishing villages were evacuated from the state of Tamaulipas and taken to extemporaneous shelters at schools and a sports complex. One drowning death was reported in northeast Mexico, caused by the extensive flooding from Beryl's heavy rains. Officials declared fifteen municipalities in Tamaulipas a disaster area. The total damage in Mexico was estimated to be $254,000 (2000 MXN, $27,400 2000 USD). Moisture from Beryl brought 0.8 in (20 mm) of rain in Corpus Christi, Texas and 0.5 in (13 mm) in Brownsville, Texas in a 48-hour period between August 14 and August 16. Cloud cover and rainfall resulted with cool high temperatures in southern Texas. At Brownsville, the high temperature of 84 °F (29 °C) on August 15 set a daily record for coldest high temperature on the date.

=== Tropical Storm Chris ===
- Tropical storm (SSHWS)
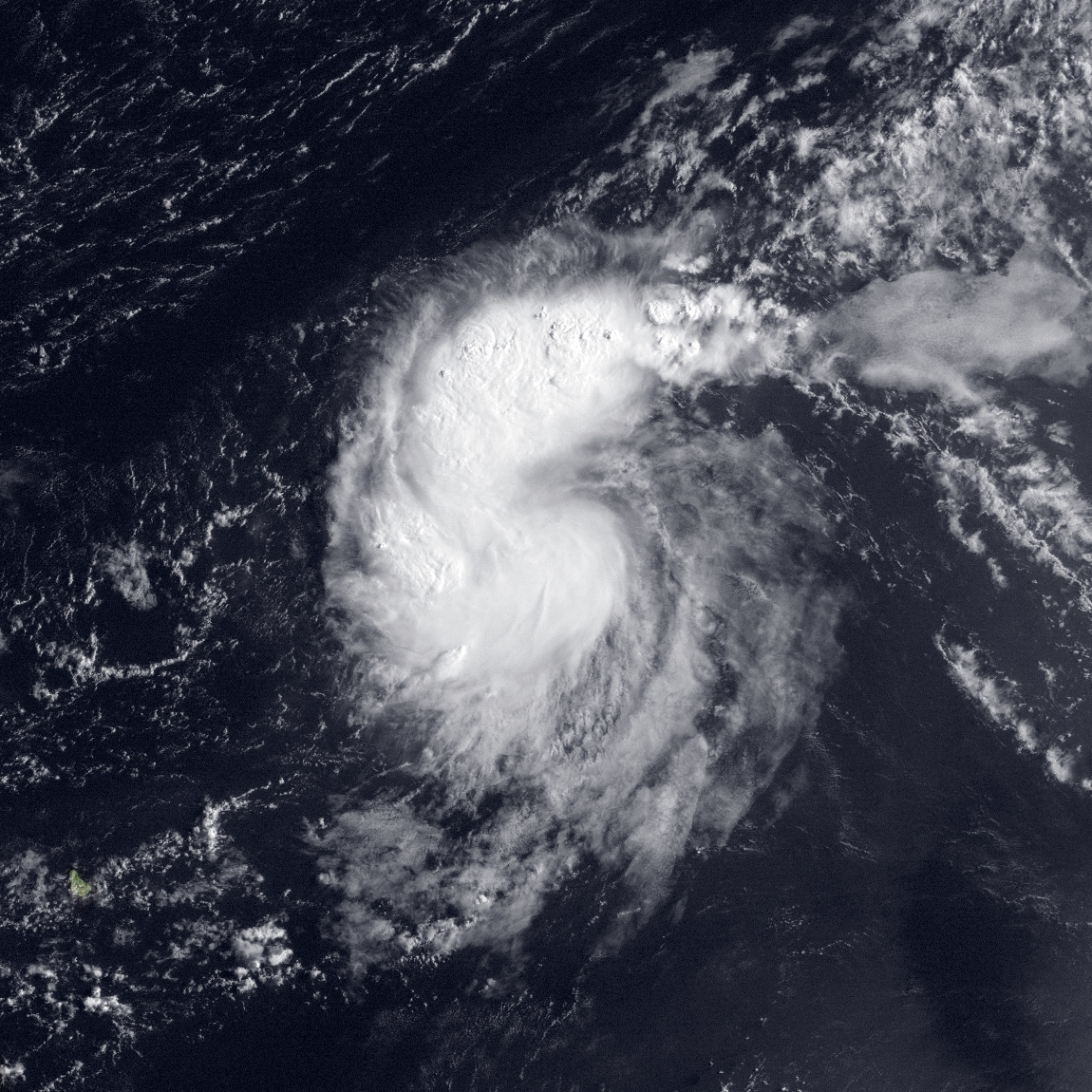
- Duration: August 17 – August 19
- Peak intensity: 40 mph (65 km/h) (1-min); 1008 mbar (hPa)

A tropical wave exited the west coast of Africa on August 12. Although large amounts of deep convection accompanied the system, it was displaced from the poorly defined center. Over the next few days, convection consolidated and by 1200 UTC on August 17, the system began as Tropical Depression Six, while centered about 690 miles (1,110 km) east of the Lesser Antilles. Because of a burst in deep convection, as well as satellite imagery estimating winds of 40 mph (65 km/h), the depression strengthened into Tropical Storm Chris at 1200 UTC on August 18. Upon becoming a tropical storm, Chris attained its peak intensity with winds of 40 mph (65 km/h) and a minimum barometric pressure of 1,008 mbar (29.8 inHg). Chris weakened back to a tropical depression by 1800 UTC on August 18, after having been a tropical storm for only six hours. However, the National Hurricane Center operationally held Chris at tropical storm intensity until early on the following day. Convection was nearly non-existent early on August 19, though there were a few small bursts in convection. Later that day, a reconnaissance aircraft flight into the storm found no circulation. As a result, Chris dissipated while east of the northernmost Leeward Islands at 1200 UTC on August 19.

=== Hurricane Debby ===
- Category 1 hurricane (SSHWS)
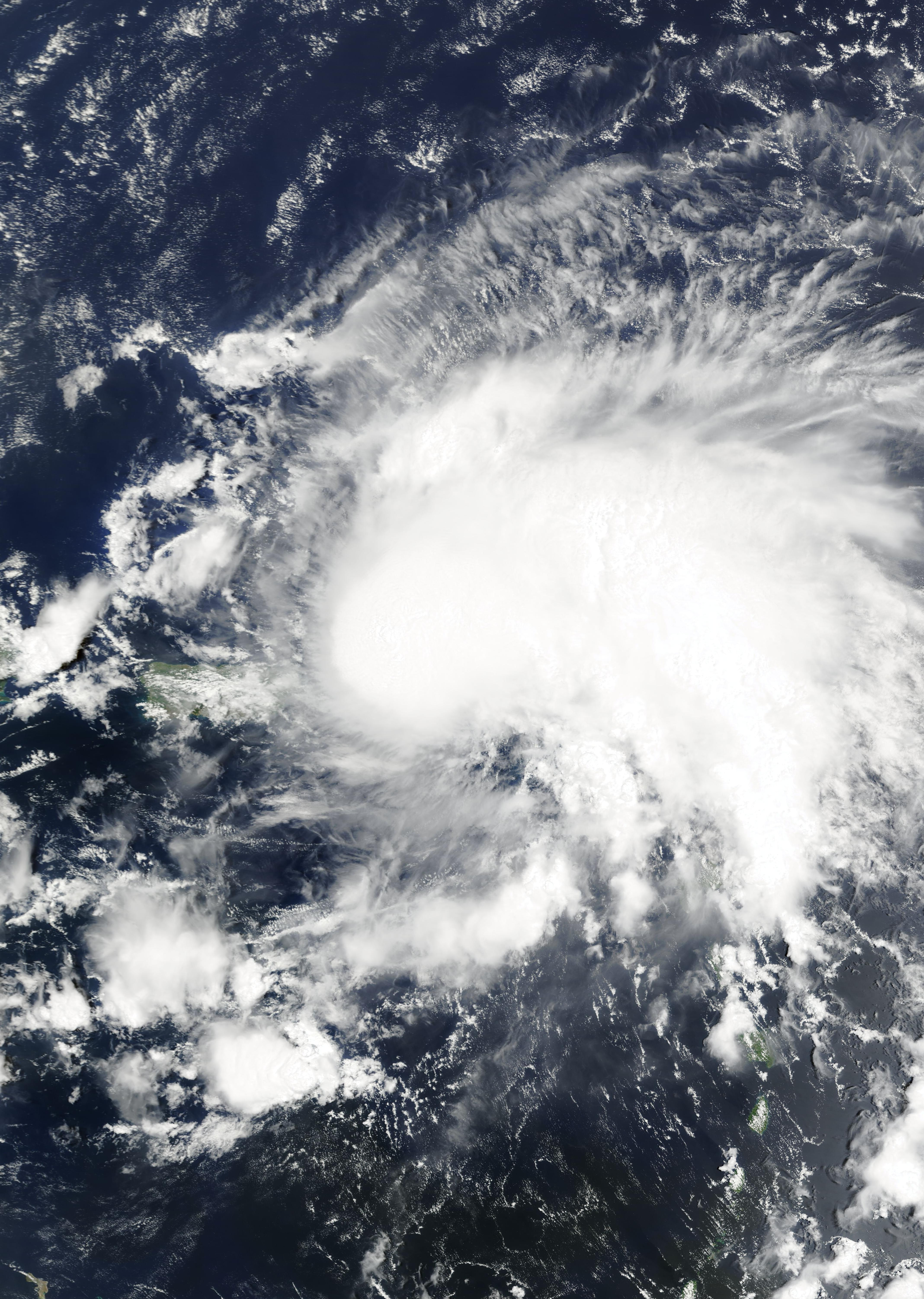
- Duration: August 19 – August 24
- Peak intensity: 85 mph (140 km/h) (1-min); 991 mbar (hPa)

A strong tropical wave exited the west coast of Africa on August 16. No development occurred until August 19, when convection began consolidating around a well-defined low-level circulation. As a result, the system became Tropical Depression Seven at 1800 UTC on that same day, while located about 1,035 miles (1,666 km) east of the Windward Islands. Favorable conditions allowed the depression to become Tropical Storm Debby early on August 20 and further strengthening into a hurricane occurred 24 hours later. At 1200 UTC on August 21, sustained winds peaked at 85 mph (135 km/h). Debby made three landfalls on August 22, in Barbuda, Saint Barthélemy, and Virgin Gorda, before re-entering the Atlantic north of Puerto Rico. As Debby paralleled the north coast of Hispaniola late on August 23, it weakened to a tropical storm. Unexpectedly, the storm continued westward and weakened further, instead of approaching Florida and strengthening into a major hurricane. While south of eastern Cuba on August 24, Debby was downgraded to a tropical depression, six hours becoming completely dissipating.

Light rainfall and gusty winds caused minor damage in Barbuda, Saint Martin, and Trinidad and Tobago. Brief blackouts and damage reaching $200,000 was reported in the United States Virgin Islands. Effects were most severe in Puerto Rico, where some areas experienced more than 12 inches (300 mm) of rainfall. Mudslides caused by flooding damaged roads, bridges, and houses. At 406 homes on the island were flooded, which five suffering at least moderate damage. In San Juan, slick roads caused several minor car accidents. One indirect fatality was attributed to the storm after a man fell off his roof while attempting to remove a satellite dish. Damage on the island of Puerto Rico reached $501,000. According to the Civil Defense Force of Dominican Republic, severe flooding in the northern portions of that country caused the evacuation of more than 700 people. In Haiti, squalls tore tin roofs off of numerous shanty homes and subsequently flooded a few. Rainfall in Cuba brought relief to an eight-month-long drought in eastern Cuba.

=== Tropical Storm Ernesto ===
- Tropical storm (SSHWS)
- Duration: September 1 – September 3
- Peak intensity: 40 mph (65 km/h) (1-min); 1008 mbar (hPa)

A tropical wave emerged into the Atlantic from the west coast of Africa on August 28. While tracking west-northwestward, satellite imagery indicated a developing low-level circulation. After significant deep convection formed, the system was classified as Tropical Depression Eight at 1200 UTC on September 1. The depression tracked west-northwestward under the influence of a subtropical ridge to its north. Because of satellite intensity estimates of sustained winds of 40 mph (64 km/h), increased deep convection, and improvements in outflow, the depression became Tropical Storm Ernesto at 0600 UTC on September 2. However, the NHC noted in its Tropical Cyclone Report on Ernesto that it may not have been a tropical cyclone at all, as QuikSCAT surface wind estimates indicated that there was no closed circulation, although the data was dismissed as inconclusive. As it strengthened into a tropical storm, Ernesto attained its peak intensity with winds of 40 mph (64 km/h) and a minimum pressure of 1,008 mbar (29.8 inHg). Because of vertical shear, the low-level circulation did not become well-defined. Although deep convection re-developed near the center early on September 3, no intensification occurred. At 1800 UTC on September 3, Ernesto weakened to a tropical depression. Six hours later, Ernesto dissipated to the east-northeast of the Leeward Islands.

=== Tropical Depression Nine ===
- Tropical depression (SSHWS)
- Duration: September 8 – September 9
- Peak intensity: 35 mph (55 km/h) (1-min); 1006 mbar (hPa)

A low-level trough and a cluster of convection associated with a tropical wave interacted in the Gulf of Mexico in early September 2000. A disorganized low-level center developed and, thus, the system was classified as Tropical Depression Nine while located 185 miles (298 km) south of Lake Charles, Louisiana on September 8. Due to proximity to land, the depression was unable to intensify into a tropical storm and attained a maximum wind speed of 35 mph (56 km/h). The depression weakened slightly before making landfall near Sabine Pass, Texas on September 9. Eight hours later, the depression dissipated while barely inland.

The depression brought light to moderate rainfall to Louisiana, Mississippi, Arkansas, Alabama, and Texas, though it was generally less than 3 inches (76 mm). A few areas in southern Louisiana, Mississippi, and Alabama reported precipitation in excess of 6 inches (150 mm); rainfall associated with the depression peaked at 6.70 inches (170 mm) in Buras-Triumph, Louisiana. However, the depression caused no damage or fatalities.

=== Hurricane Florence ===
- Category 1 hurricane (SSHWS)
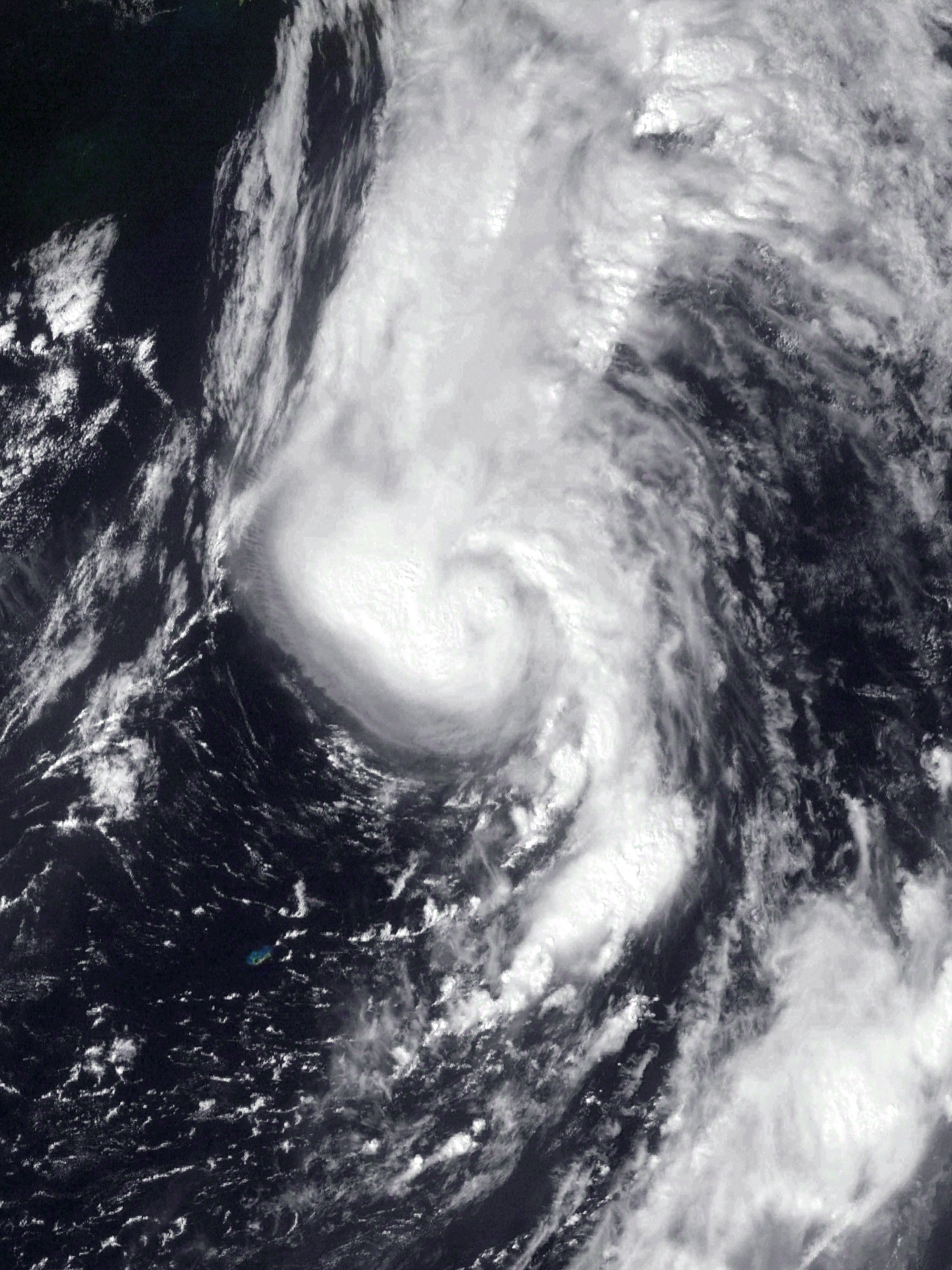
- Duration: September 10 – September 17
- Peak intensity: 80 mph (130 km/h) (1-min); 985 mbar (hPa)

In early September, a cold front stalled over the western Atlantic Ocean, leading to a frontal wave forming by September 8. The convection increased while the wave detached from the cold front. Late on September 10, a subtropical depression developed located about 375 mi (605 km) west-southwest of Bermuda, which moved to the west-southwest. The subtropical designation was due to its close proximity to a cold-core low, but by 06:00 UTC on September 11, it transitioned into a tropical depression. Soon after, it strengthened into Tropical Storm Florence, as the thunderstorms increased and around the circulation center. Following a period of rapid strengthening, Florence attained hurricane status late on September 11, based on observations from the Hurricane Hunters. The strongest winds were confined to a very small area near the edge of the convection, and by September 12, drier air weakened briefly Florence back to tropical storm status. It soon regained hurricane status, but Florence weakened again to a tropical storm on September 13 due to cooler waters and stronger wind shear. That day, the motion became nearly stationary, followed by a drift to the south, due to competing steering influences between two ridges. An approaching short-wave trough turned Florence toward the east. The thunderstorms increased again, and Florence attained hurricane status for a third time on September 16. That day, it passed about 75 mi (120 km) northwest of Bermuda, its closest approach, and shortly thereafter Florence reached peak winds of 80 mph (130 km/h). On September 17, Florence weakened due to cooler waters, and later that day was absorbed by the frontal trough, while located 80 mi (130 km) south of Cape Race on the island of Newfoundland.

Florence produced large waves along the east coast of the United States, killing three surfers in North Carolina. Seven other people needed rescue, and at least two beaches were closed. Bermuda endured sustained winds of 41 mph (67 km/h), gusting to 58 mph (93 km/h). Rainfall at L.F. Wade International Airport reached 0.47 in (12 mm).

=== Hurricane Gordon ===
- Category 1 hurricane (SSHWS)
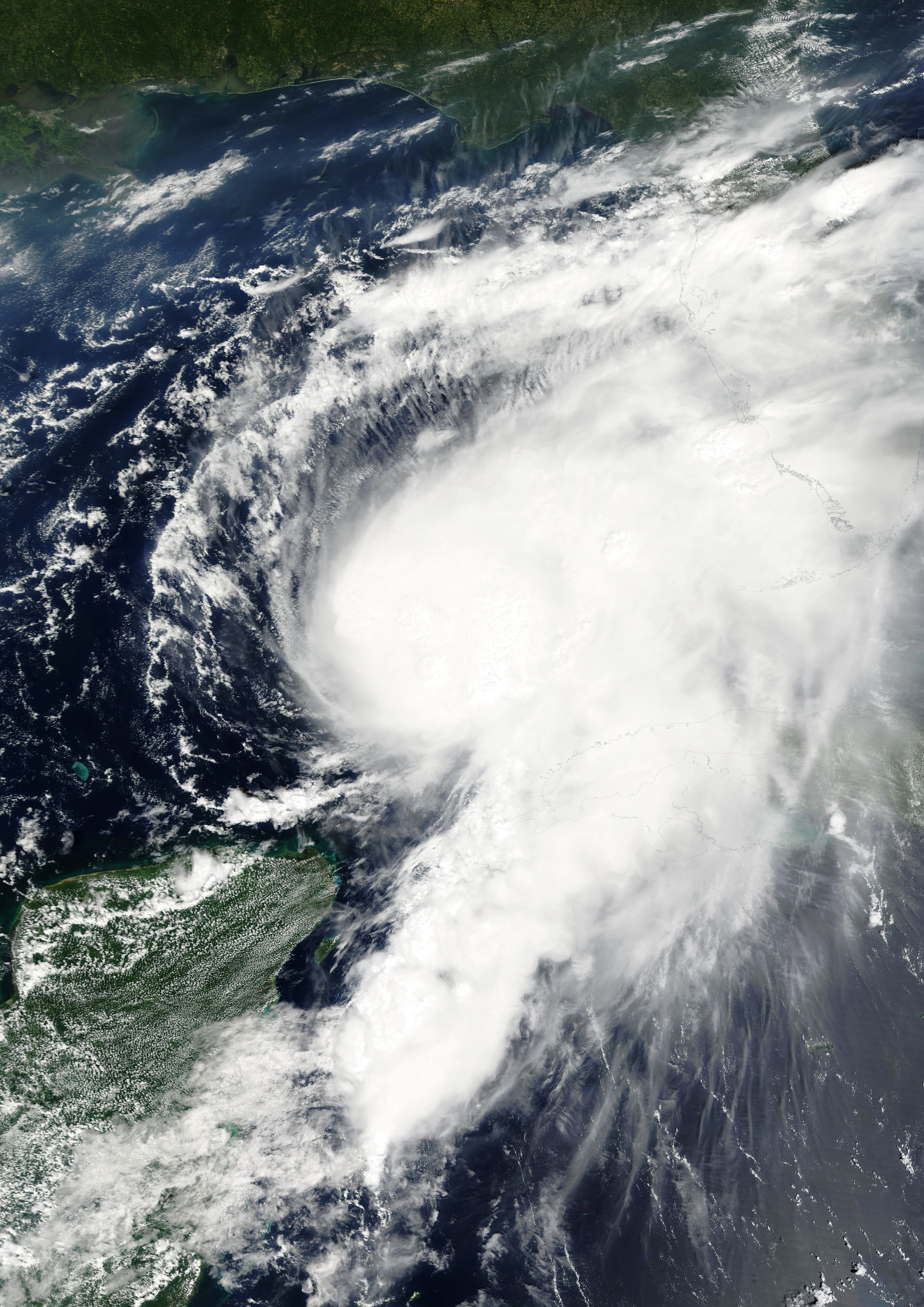
- Duration: September 14 – September 18
- Peak intensity: 80 mph (130 km/h) (1-min); 981 mbar (hPa)

A tropical wave exited the west coast of Africa on September 4 and tracked westward across the Atlantic Ocean with minimal organization for four days. After slowly developing convection between September 8 and 14, an Air Force Reserve reconnaissance aircraft reported a closed circulation. As a result, the system was classified as Tropical Depression Eleven just offshore Quintana Roo. Shortly thereafter, the depression made landfall in Quintana Roo. On September 15, the system emerged into the Gulf of Mexico. Due to warm sea surface temperatures, the depression strengthened into Tropical Storm Gordon on the following day and further to hurricane intensity on September 17 while tracking northeastward. However, vertical wind shear and dry air entrainment weakened Gordon to a tropical storm later that day. At 0300 UTC on September 18, Gordon made landfall near Cedar Key, Florida with winds of 65 mph (105 km/h). Gordon rapidly weakened inland and was only a tropical depression when it was absorbed by a frontal system over Georgia about 15 hours later.

While passing through the Lesser Antilles, the precursor tropical wave caused locally heavy rainfall and wind gusts between 29 and 35 mph (47 and 56 km/h). Shortly before developing into a tropical cyclone, flooding in mountainous areas of Guatemala caused 23 fatalities. In its early stages, Gordon produced locally heavy rainfall in Cuba and the Yucatán Peninsula. The storm produced abnormally high tides along the west coast of Florida, which caused widespread, but minor coastal flooding. At least 65 homes and businesses were flooded, while numerous coastal roads, including Bayshore Boulevard and the Courtney Campbell Causeway, were closed due to water inundation. One fatality occurred near Pensacola, after a surfer drowned in rough seas. Strong winds in the state caused damage to houses, businesses, power lines, and trees. Two tornadoes in Southwest Florida extensively damaged 2 condominiums and at least 24 houses. A third tornado along the east coast of Central Florida caused minimal damage to trees and roofs. Minor flooding occurred in some areas due to rainfall reaching 9.48 inches (241 mm) in Mayo. In North Carolina, flooding caused two indirect fatalities when a car lost control and crashed into a tractor trailer. In other states, light rainfall caused mostly minor effects. Overall, Gordon was responsible for $10.8 million in damage.

=== Tropical Storm Helene ===
- Tropical storm (SSHWS)
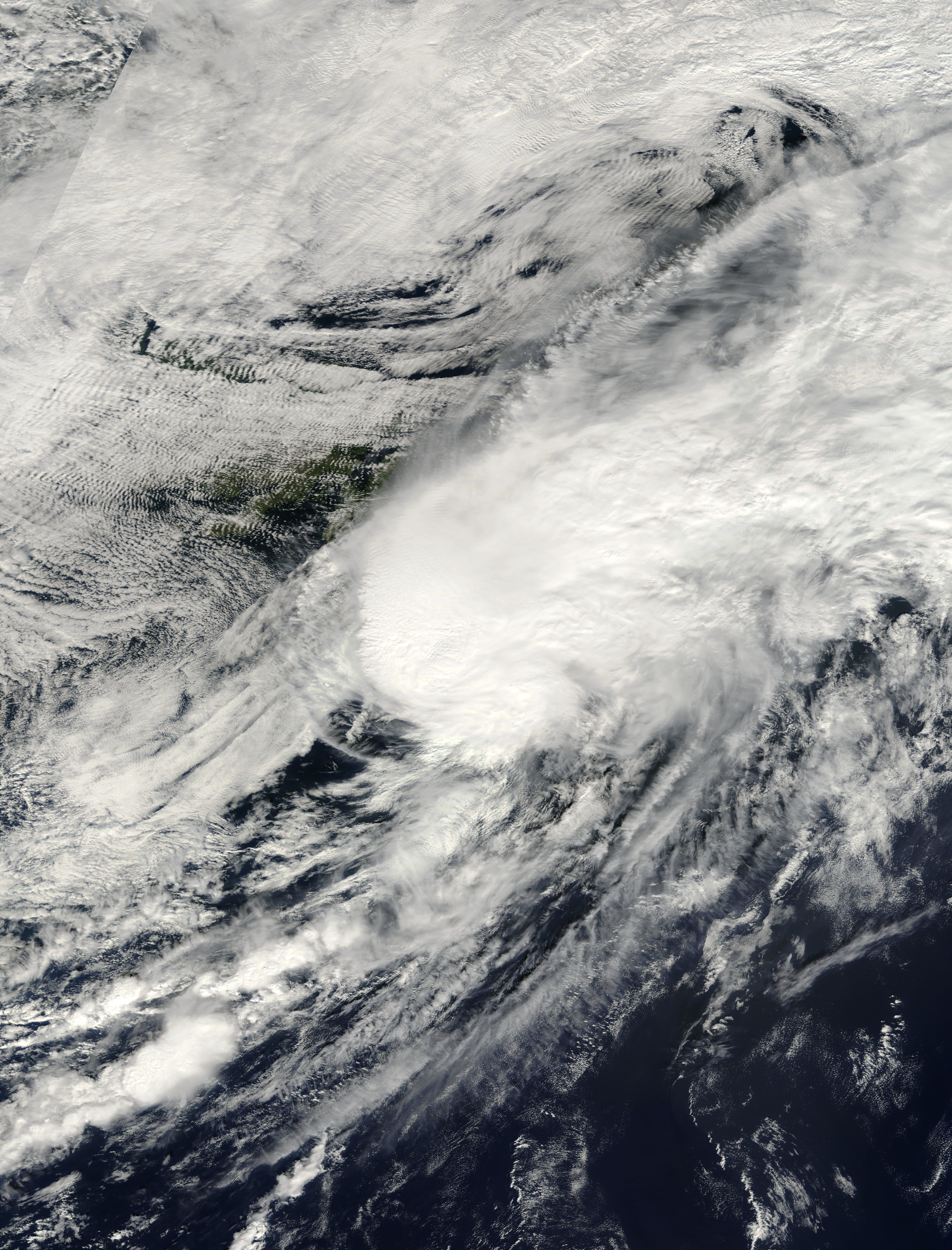
- Duration: September 15 – September 25
- Peak intensity: 70 mph (110 km/h) (1-min); 986 mbar (hPa)

A tropical wave emerged into the Atlantic from the west coast of Africa on September 10 and gradually developed into Tropical Depression Twelve on September 15, while located more than 600 miles (970 km) east of the Leeward Islands. It did not intensify and degenerated to a tropical wave on the following day. The remnants continued westward and crossed the Leeward Islands on September 17. Late on September 19, the remnants redeveloped into Tropical Depression Twelve near Grand Cayman. Around 1200 UTC on September 20, the depression crossed near the western tip of Cuba. Entering the Gulf of Mexico, the depression began strengthening, and became Tropical Storm Helene at early on September 21, while tracking northward. Later that day, Helene peaked with winds of 70 mph (110 km/h), though due to increasing wind shear, the storm soon began to weaken. At 1200 UTC on September 22, Helene made landfall near Fort Walton Beach, Florida with winds of 40 mph (64 km/h). Although the storm weakened slightly inland, it later began re-strengthening and became a tropical storm over North Carolina late on September 23. After re-emerging into the Atlantic Ocean, Helene re-intensified to near hurricane status, though the storm was absorbed by a cold front on September 26, while east-southeast of Newfoundland.

The remnant tropical wave produced strong winds and flooding in the Lesser Antilles. Effects were the worst in Puerto Rico, where flash flooding and mudslides destroyed one home and damaged at least one-hundred others. In addition, a bridge was also destroyed and many other roads were impassable due to flooding. Impact in Cuba, Jamaica, and Hispaniola is unknown. A combination of gusty winds, locally heavy rainfall, and a few tornadoes in the Florida Panhandle caused about 5,000 power outages, damaged more than 220 homes, and destroyed two houses and four mobile homes. Heavy rainfall caused the Sopchoppy River to exceed its banks, flooding nearby houses. Outside of Florida, effects were most severe in South Carolina, where rainfall in excess of 9 inches (230 mm) fell, and a tornado caused one fatality, six injuries, and damaged 12 houses. The other death in the state occurred when a car hydroplaned and crashed into a tree, which killed the driver. Throughout its path, Helene caused slightly more than $16 million in damage.

=== Hurricane Isaac ===
- Category 4 hurricane (SSHWS)
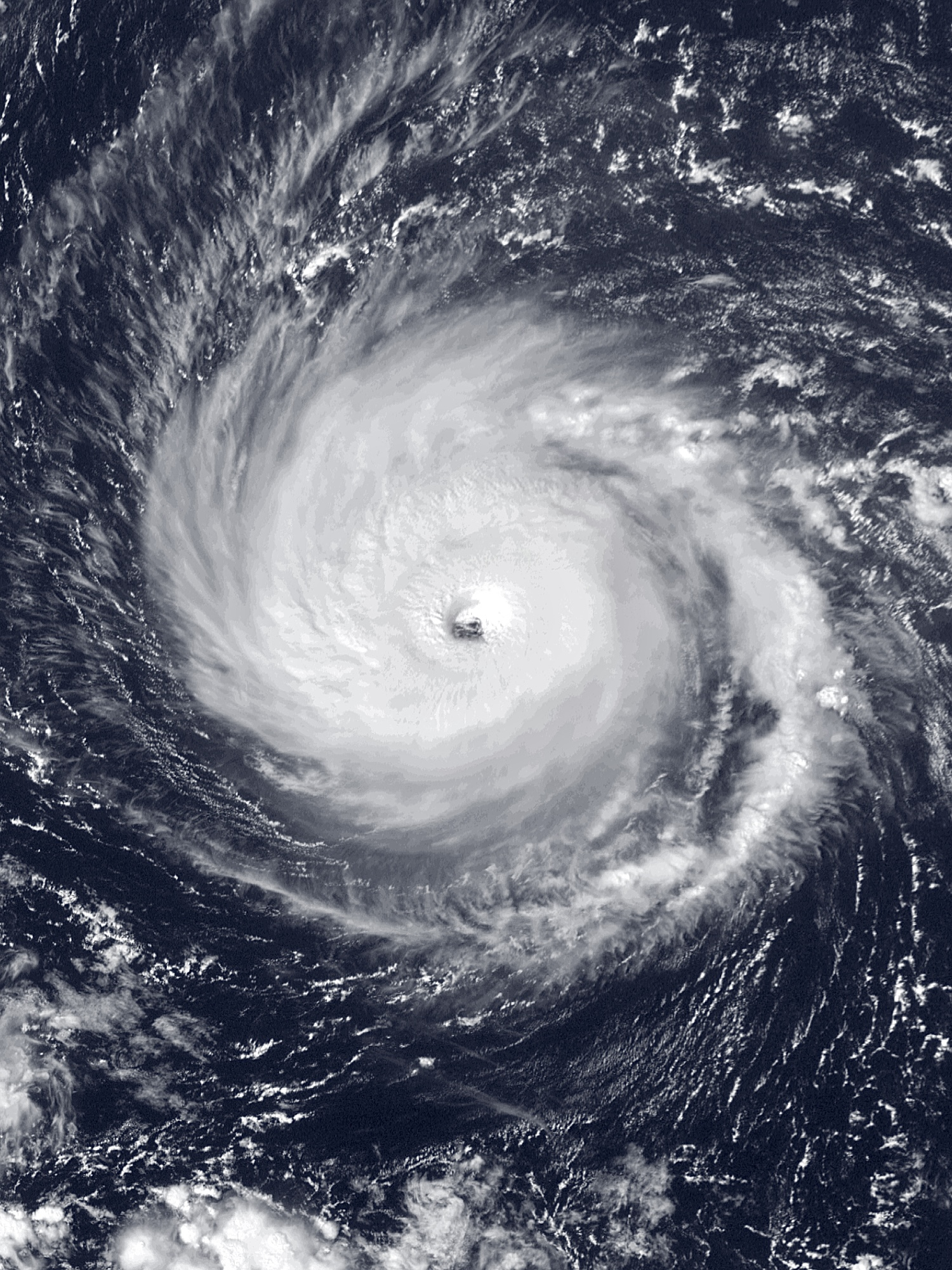
- Duration: September 21 – October 1
- Peak intensity: 140 mph (220 km/h) (1-min); 943 mbar (hPa)

A tropical wave emerged into the Atlantic on September 20, and quickly organized as its convection consolidated. It developed into Tropical Depression Thirteen at 12:00 UTC on September 21 to the south of Cape Verde. With favorable conditions, the depression intensified into Tropical Storm Isaac on September 22, as its rainbands organized. A ridge steered the storm to the west-northwest. Isaac continued to strengthen and reached hurricane status at 12:00 UTC on September 23. On the following day, it reached an initial peak intensity with winds of 120 mph (205 km/h). An increase in wind shear caused Isaac to weaken to a minimal hurricane, although the shear later dropped and allowed Isaac to restrengthen. After developing a well-defined eye, Isaac attained its peak intensity late on September 28, with winds of 140 mph (220 km/h) and a minimum barometric pressure of 943 mbar (27.8 inHg). Around the time of its peak intensity, Isaac began curving northward as it reached the western periphery of the ridge. The hurricane weakened due to decreasing water temperatures and an eyewall replacement cycle. On September 29, Isaac passed about 500 miles (800 km) east of Bermuda while curving to the east-northeast. Cool, dry air entered the storm on October 1, causing Isaac to fall below hurricane-force as it transitioned into an extratropical cyclone. The extratropical remnants rapidly tracked east-northeastward and affected the British Isles on October 3 and October 4, eventually merging with another extratropical low while north of Scotland early on October 4.

While Isaac made its closest approach to Bermuda on September 29, it produced high waves offshore the island. The hurricane also produced swells that affected the east coast of the United States. In New York, a boat overturned due to high waves in Moriches Inlet, killing one of the passengers. Along the Grand Strand in South Carolina, rough surf and minor coastal flooding were reported. As an extratropical system, Isaac produced winds near gale-force on the British Isles during the day of October 3. After Isaac passed the British Isles, a bird called the blue-winged warbler was seen in Europe for the first time.

=== Hurricane Joyce ===
- Category 1 hurricane (SSHWS)
- Duration: September 25 – October 2
- Peak intensity: 90 mph (150 km/h) (1-min); 975 mbar (hPa)

A poorly organized tropical wave emerged into the Atlantic from the west coast of Africa on September 22. Influenced by a powerful ridge that developed in the wake of Hurricane Isaac, the wave traveled a brisk westward path at 14 to 18 mph (23 to 29 km/h). While in the deep tropics of the open Atlantic, the wave began to show indications of a closed circulation. On September 25, the NHC designated the system as Tropical Depression Fourteen, and a day later upgraded it to Tropical Storm Joyce. Deep convection and outflow improved, and Joyce developed an eye. On September 27, Joyce attained hurricane status, and early on September 28, Joyce reached a peak intensity of 90 mph (140 km/h) and a central pressure of 975 mbar (28.8 inHg). At the time, it was located about midway between Africa and the Lesser Antilles, and had a fleeting pinhole eye. Soon after, wind shear increased, partially exposing Joyce's center of circulation, and the hurricane weakened to a tropical storm on September 29. The storm still produced occasional bursts of convection, although it weakened further due to intrusion of Saharan air layer, causing Joyce to weaken into a tropical depression on October 1 as it crossed the Windward Islands on October 1. Although the NHC expected that the depression would reintensify, Joyce degenerated into an open tropical wave over the southeastern Caribbean Sea on October 2.

The approach of the storm prompted tropical storm warnings and watches for the Windward Islands. While weakening, Joyce passed close to Tobago, producing sustained winds of 30 mph (48 km/h). Barbados experienced sustained winds of 35 mph (56 km/h), with gusts to 45 mph (72 km/h). After degenerating into an open wave, Joyce's remnants passed over the ABC Islands, where locally heavy thunderstorms and light winds were reported on October 2.

=== Hurricane Keith ===
- Category 4 hurricane (SSHWS)
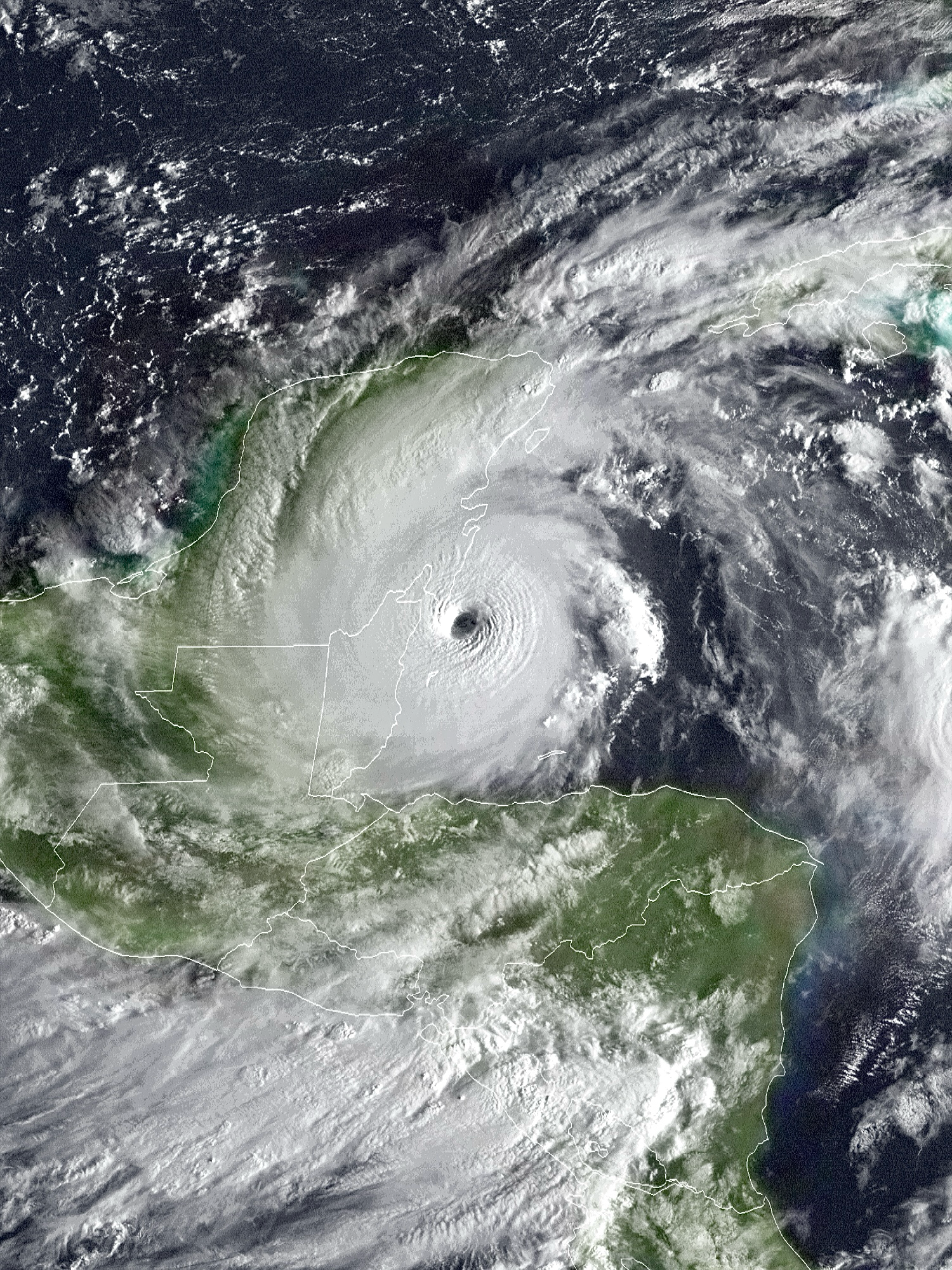
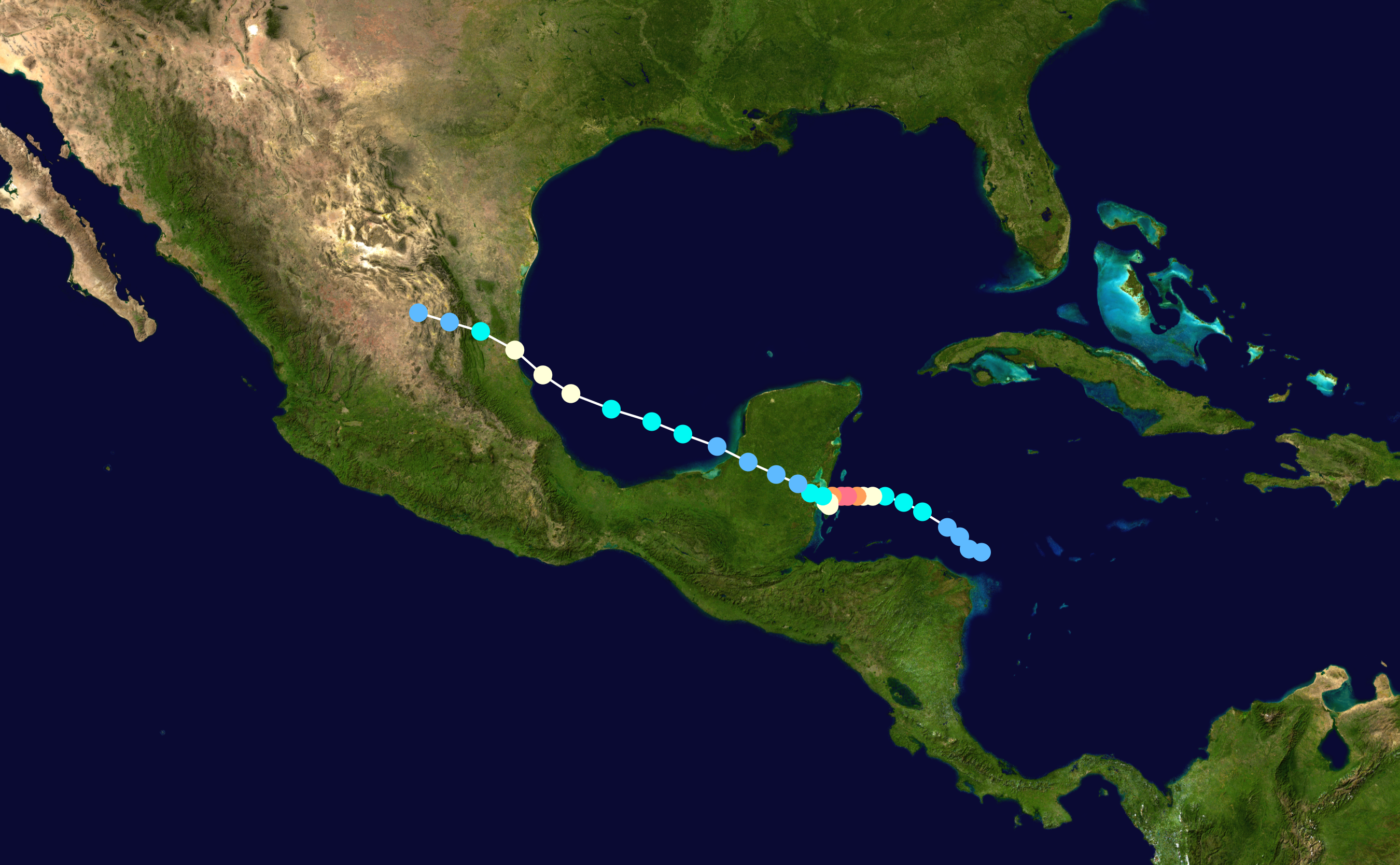
- Duration: September 28 – October 6
- Peak intensity: 140 mph (220 km/h) (1-min); 939 mbar (hPa)

A tropical wave emerged off the west coast of Africa on September 16. The system uneventfully crossed the Atlantic and Caribbean, before developing into Tropical Depression Fifteen while near Honduras on September 28. The depression gradually strengthened, and became Tropical Storm Keith on the following day. As the storm tracked westward, it continued to intensify and was upgraded to a hurricane on September 30. Shortly thereafter, Keith began to rapidly deepen and peaked as a 140 mph (230 km/h) Category 4 hurricane less than 24 hours later. Keith then began to meander erratically offshore of Belize, which significantly weakened the storm due to land interaction. By late on October 2, Keith made landfall in Ambergris Caye, Belize as a minimal hurricane. It quickly weakened to a tropical storm, before another landfall occurred near Belize City early on the following day. While moving inland over the Yucatán Peninsula, Keith weakened further, and was downgraded to a tropical depression before emerging into the Gulf of Mexico on October 4. Once in the Gulf of Mexico, Keith began to re-strengthen and was upgraded to a tropical storm later that day, and a hurricane on the following day. By late on October 5, Keith made its third and final landfall near Tampico, Tamaulipas, Mexico as a moderately strong Category 1 hurricane. The storm quickly weakened inland and dissipated as a tropical cyclone by 24 hours after landfall.

Keith brought heavy rainfall to several countries in Central America, which resulted in extensive flooding, especially in Belize and Mexico. In Guatemala, the storm flooded 10 towns, and caused one fatality. Similarly, one fatality also occurred in El Salvador, and at least 300 people were affected by flooding in that country. Thirteen communities in Nicaragua were completely isolated after Keith made roads impassable. Twelve deaths were reported in Nicaragua, all of which were flood-related. Five people were presumed dead in Honduras after an aircraft disappeared near Roatán; one other fatality occurred due to flooding. The storm brought torrential rainfall to Belize, with many areas reporting at least 10 inches (250 mm) of rain, while highest reported amount of precipitation was 32.67 inches (830 mm) in Belize City. In Belize, a village reported that only 12 houses remained, while elsewhere in the country, at least 60 homes were destroyed or damaged; several houses in Belize City suffered minor roof damage. At least 19 people were killed in Belize and damages totaled to $280 million (2000 USD). Heavy rainfall also occurred in Mexico, especially in the states of Nuevo León and Tamaulipas. Flooding by Keith caused several mudslides and a few rivers reached historic levels. Throughout Mexico, at least 460 houses were damaged or destroyed and other losses in infrastructure occurred. In addition, one person drowned due to heavy rainfall. Damages incurred in associated with Keith in Mexico totaled approximately $365.9 million (2000 MXN, $38.7 million 2000 USD). Overall, Keith was responsible for 40 deaths and $319 million (2000 USD) in damage.

=== Tropical Storm Leslie ===
- Tropical storm (SSHWS)
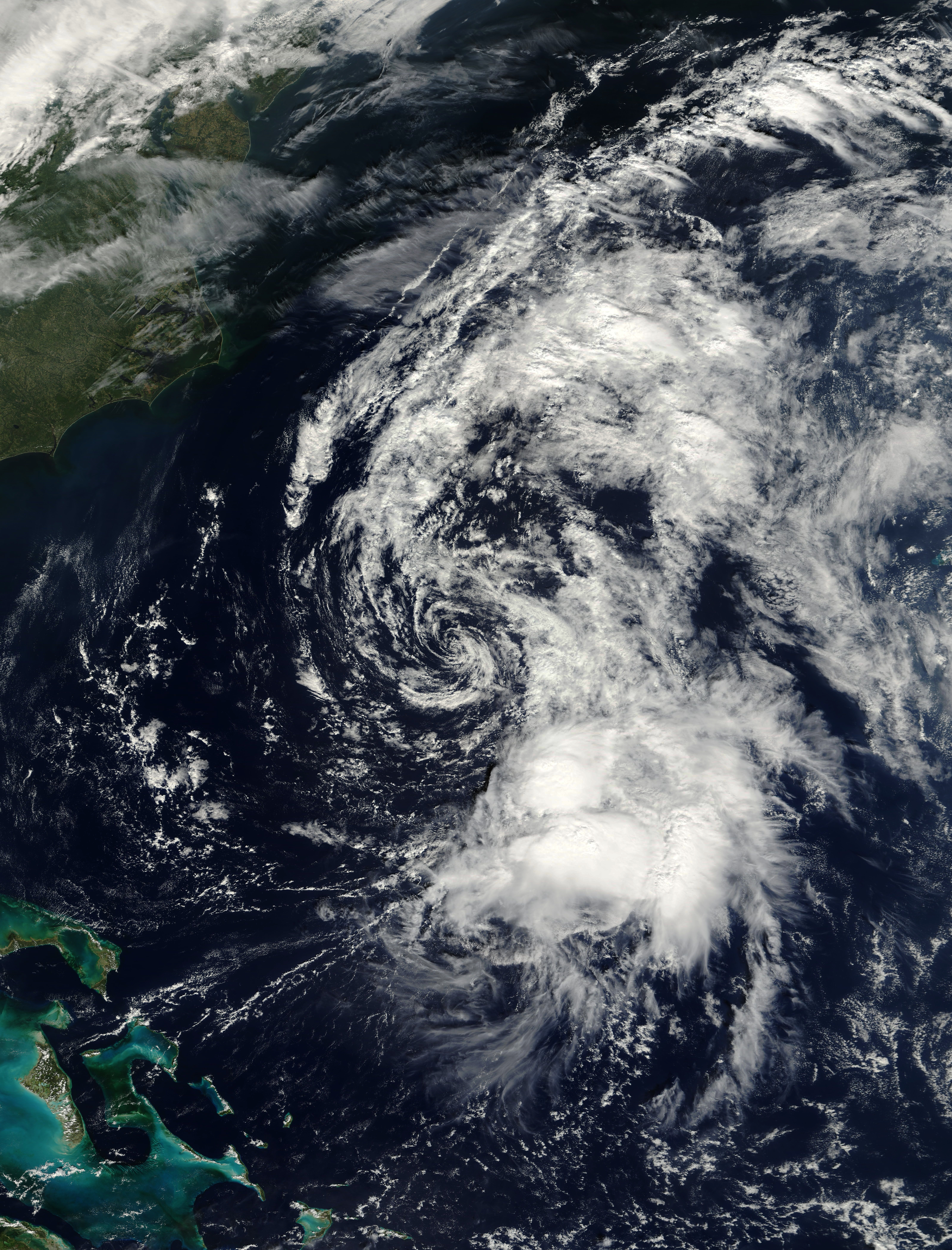
- Duration: October 4 – October 7
- Peak intensity: 45 mph (75 km/h) (1-min); 1006 mbar (hPa)

A tropical wave, which likely spawned Hurricane Isaac, entered the eastern Caribbean Sea on September 27. The system slowly organized while tracking westward and later moved to the north-northwest around Hurricane Keith. Eventually, the system moved northward into the Gulf of Mexico and the Straits of Florida. The system interacted with a frontal boundary while crossing Florida on October 3 and 4, which caused torrential rainfall. Satellite imagery indicated the development of a circulation near Orlando. Because of its structure, the system became a subtropical depression at 1200 UTC on October 4. About six hours later, the subtropical depression emerged into the Atlantic and low-level circulation gradually moved toward the deep convection while tracking eastward. By 1200 UTC on October 5, the subtropical depression was reclassified as Tropical Storm Leslie. While fully tropical, Leslie strengthened slightly and peaked with winds of 45 mph (72 km/h). However, it soon began interacting with a cold front and transitioned into an extratropical cyclone on October 7, while located northwest of Bermuda.

The system dropped heavy rainfall in Cuba, peaking at 8.25 inches (210 mm) in the Havana Province. While the precursor crossed Florida, it produced torrential rainfall across southern Florida, especially in the Miami metropolitan area. In Miami-Dade County alone, 1,005 houses were destroyed, 1,358 were severely damaged, and 3,443 had minor damage. Throughout the state, at least 93,000 homes were flooded. Electrical stations were also damaged by floods, leaving more than 27,000 people without power. Extensive agricultural damage occurred, with 40,000 acres (160 km^{2}) of farmland inundated by water. Overall, the precursor system of Leslie resulted in about $950 million (2000 USD) in damage, slightly more than half of that figure was agriculture related. Additionally, three fatalities occurred, two of which due to drowning, while the third was a man that fell while attempting to unclog a roof drain. The remnants of Leslie caused near tropical storm force winds and waves up to 16 feet (4.9 m) in Newfoundland, though damage in the region was minimal.

=== Hurricane Michael ===
- Category 2 hurricane (SSHWS)
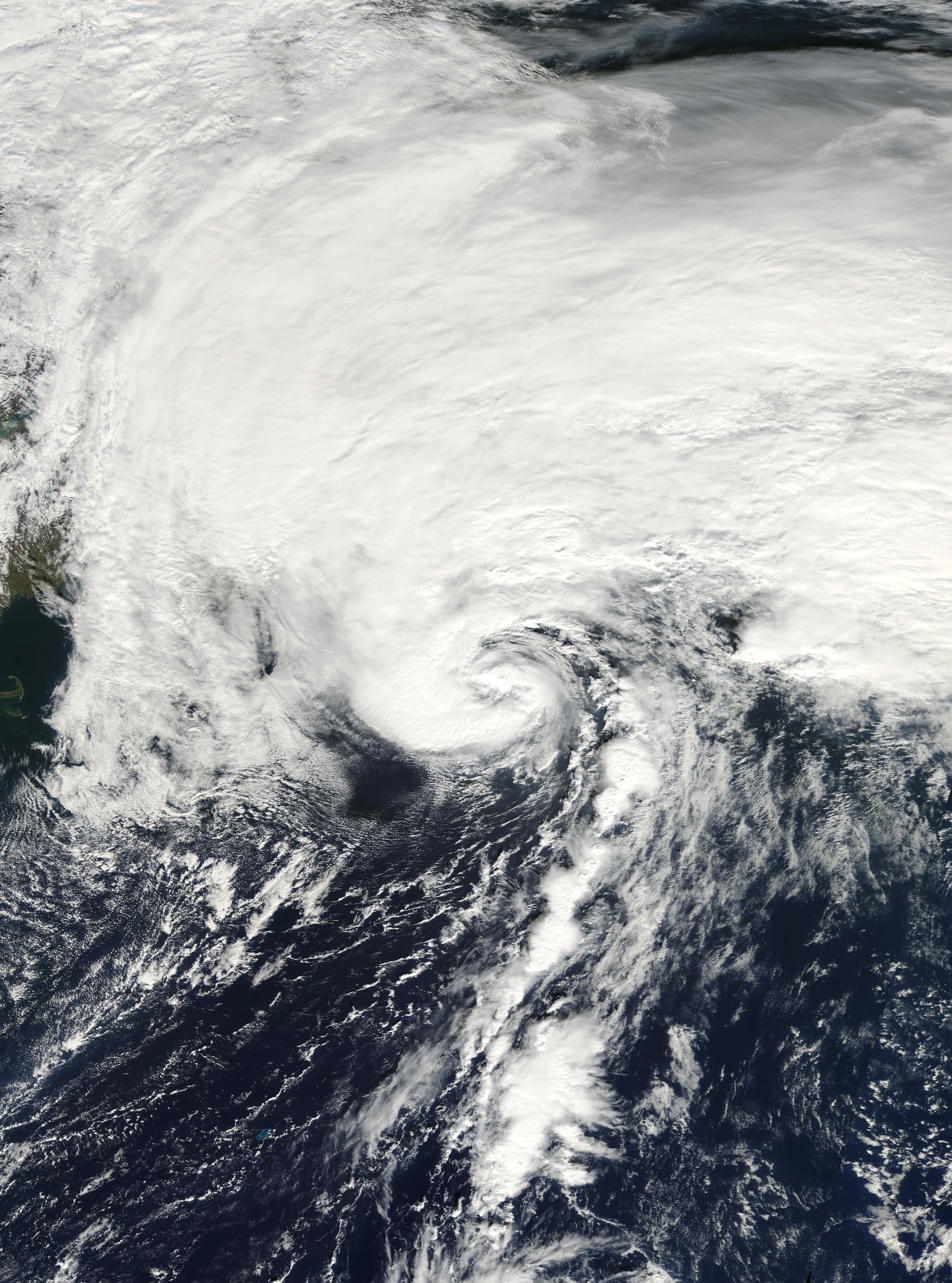
- Duration: October 15 – October 19
- Peak intensity: 100 mph (155 km/h) (1-min); 965 mbar (hPa)

A low-pressure system developed after detaching from a cold front while between Florida and Bermuda. The low-pressure area slowly formed a circulation and began to deepen on October 14 as it drifted north-northeastward. By October 15, the system developed into a subtropical depression while centered about midway between Florida and Bermuda. Later that day, satellite classifications using the Hebert-Poteat technique indicated that the subtropical depression had strengthened into a subtropical storm, and it was upgraded at 0000 UTC on October 16. Due to SST's in excess of 82 °F (28 °C), the subtropical storm developed persistent convection near the low-level center and it slowly acquired tropical characteristics. By 0000 UTC on October 17, the subtropical storm was re-classified as Tropical Storm Michael. Three hours later, the National Hurricane Center began advisories on Michael, though initially it was erroneously classified as Tropical Depression Seventeen.

Although Michael was predicted to intensify only modestly, it rapidly strengthened, and became a hurricane later on October 17. Michael fluctuated slightly in intensity while tracking over an area of decreasing SST's. However, another brief period of rapid intensification occurred due to baroclinic effects, and Michael peaked as a minimal Category 2 hurricane. Shortly thereafter, Michael transitioned into an extratropical cyclone before making landfall near Harbour Breton, Newfoundland. Throughout Newfoundland, Michael and the remnant extratropical cyclone produced high winds, which tore off roofs, ripped off roof shingles, caused sporadic power outages, shattered windows, and uprooted trees in a few communities. Precipitation produced by the storm was light and peaked at 3.77 inches (96 mm) in North Mountain, Nova Scotia. Michael also produced rainfall in Maine and Bermuda. There were no damage figures available, though damage was considered to be relatively light.

=== Tropical Storm Nadine ===
- Tropical storm (SSHWS)
- Duration: October 19 – October 22
- Peak intensity: 60 mph (95 km/h) (1-min); 999 mbar (hPa)

In mid-October, a strong upper-level trough and a tropical wave interacted while located in the central Atlantic. The system moved slowly westward and convection began increasing. By October 19, the system became stationary and developed a surface circulation. Later that day, Tropical Depression Eighteen developed about 690 miles (1,110 km) southeast of Bermuda. Initially, the depression lacked a well-defined center, though a broad circulation was evident. The depression tracked slowly northward and then northeastward around a subtropical ridge and ahead of a cold front. As wind shear decreased, convective activity became better organized on October 20. By 1200 UTC on that day, the depression was upgraded to Tropical Storm Nadine.

At 0000 UTC on October 21, Nadine attained its peak intensity with winds of 60 mph (95 km/h) and a minimum barometric pressure of 999 mbar (29.5 inHg). Around the time of peak intensity, a possible eye-like feature and an impressive outflow were observed on satellite imagery. However, shortly thereafter, wind shear increased and the storm resembled a frontal wave and appeared to possibly be interacting with the cold front. The cloud pattern then became ragged, while the low-level circulation moved toward the southern edge of the deep convection. By 0000 UTC on October 22, Nadine transitioned into an extratropical cyclone and merged with a frontal low about 18 hours later.

=== Unnamed subtropical storm ===
- Subtropical storm (SSHWS)
- Duration: October 25 – October 29
- Peak intensity: 65 mph (100 km/h) (1-min); 976 mbar (hPa)

On October 25, an extratropical low pressure system formed to the east of the Turks and Caicos Islands. It moved northwestward and gradually intensified, and by 1800 UTC the system transitioned into a subtropical storm. It turned to the north and later to the northeast. A burst of convection near the center allowed the storm to attain peak winds of 65 mph (105 km/h); due to its forward motion, it is possible the surface winds reached as high as 85 mph (137 km/h). An approaching cold front caused the storm to become extratropical on October 29, and later that day a larger extratropical storm absorbed the previously subtropical storm near Nova Scotia.

The Marine Prediction Center issued some marine gale and storm warnings offshore, while the National Weather Service issued gale warnings for coastal North Carolina. It was not designated as a subtropical cyclone operationally. The storm produced tropical storm force winds in portions of Atlantic Canada, although it was associated with the larger extratropical storm at the time. Several ships also recorded tropical storm force winds, one of which recorded peak winds of 53 mph (85 km/h).

== Storm names ==
The following list of names was used for named storms that formed in the North Atlantic in 2000. This was the same list used in the 1994 season as no names were retired from that year. Storms were named Joyce (which had replaced Joan in 1988), Leslie, Michael, and Nadine for the first time this year.

- Alberto
- Beryl
- Chris
- Debby
- Ernesto
- Florence
- Gordon
- Helene
- Isaac
- Joyce
- Keith
- Leslie
- Michael
- Nadine
- Oscar (unused)
- Patty (unused)
- Rafael (unused)
- Sandy (unused)
- Tony (unused)
- Valerie (unused)
- William (unused)

=== Retirement ===
In spring of 2001, the World Meteorological Organization retired the name Keith from the Atlantic hurricane name lists due to its high impact. It was replaced with the name Kirk for the 2006 season.

== Season effects ==
This is a table of all of the storms that formed in the 2000 Atlantic hurricane season. It includes their name, duration, peak classification and intensities, areas affected, damage, and death totals. Deaths in parentheses are additional and indirect (an example of an indirect death would be a traffic accident), but were still related to that storm. Damage and deaths include totals while the storm was extratropical, a wave, or a low, and all of the damage figures are in 2000 USD.

Saffir–Simpson scale
TD	TS	C1	C2	C3	C4	C5

2000 North Atlantic tropical cyclone season statistics
Storm name	Dates active	Storm category at peak intensity	Max 1-min wind mph (km/h)	Min. press. (mbar)	Areas affected	Damage (US$)	Deaths	Ref(s).
One	June 7–8	Tropical depression	30 (45)	1008	Mexico, Texas	None	None	
Two	June 23–25	Tropical depression	35 (55)	1008	None	None	None	
Alberto	August 3–23	Category 3 hurricane	125 (205)	950	Senegal, East Coast of the United States, Iceland, Greenland, Jan Mayen	None	None	
Four	August 8–11	Tropical depression	35 (55)	1009	None	None	None	
Beryl	August 13–15	Tropical storm	50 (85)	1007	Mexico, Texas	$27,000	1	
Chris	August 17–19	Tropical storm	40 (65)	1008	None	None	None	
Debby	August 19–24	Category 1 hurricane	85 (140)	991	Lesser Antilles, Greater Antilles, Turks and Caicos, Florida	$735,000	0 (1)	
Ernesto	September 1–3	Tropical storm	40 (65)	1008	None	None	None	
Nine	September 8–9	Tropical depression	35 (55)	1008	Gulf Coast of the United States	None	None	
Florence	September 10–17	Category 1 hurricane	80 (130)	985	Bermuda, North Carolina, Newfoundland	None	0 (3)	
Gordon	September 14–21	Category 1 hurricane	80 (130)	981	Mexico, Southeastern United States, Mid-Atlantic states, New England	$10.8 million	24 (2)	
Helene	September 15–25	Tropical storm	70 (110)	986	Puerto Rico, Southeastern United States	$16 million	1 (1)	
Isaac	September 21 – October 1	Category 4 hurricane	140 (220)	943	Cape Verde, Bermuda, East Coast of the United States, British Isles	Minimal	1	
Joyce	September 25 – October 2	Category 1 hurricane	90 (150)	975	Windward Islands, ABC Islands, Dominican Republic	Minimal	None	
Keith	September 28 – October 6	Category 4 hurricane	140 (220)	939	Central America, Mexico	$319 million	62 (6)	
Leslie	October 4–7	Tropical storm	45 (75)	1006	Cuba, Florida, Bermuda, Newfoundland	$950 million	0 (3)	
Michael	October 15–20	Category 2 hurricane	100 (155)	965	Bermuda, Maine, Atlantic Canada	Unknown	None	
Nadine	October 19–21	Tropical storm	60 (95)	999	None	None	None	
Unnamed	October 25–29	Subtropical storm	65 (100)	976	New England, Atlantic Canada	Unknown	None	
Season aggregates
19 systems	June 7 – October 29		140 (220)	939		$1.296 billion	89 (16)	

== See also ==
- 2000 Pacific hurricane season
- 2000 Pacific typhoon season
- 2000 North Indian Ocean cyclone season
- Australian region cyclone season: 1999–2000, 2000–01
- South Pacific cyclone season: 1999–2000, 2000–01
- South-West Indian Ocean cyclone season: 1999–2000, 2000–01
- South Atlantic tropical cyclone
- Mediterranean tropical-like cyclone
