= Hurricane Michael (2000) =

Category 2 Atlantic hurricane in 2000

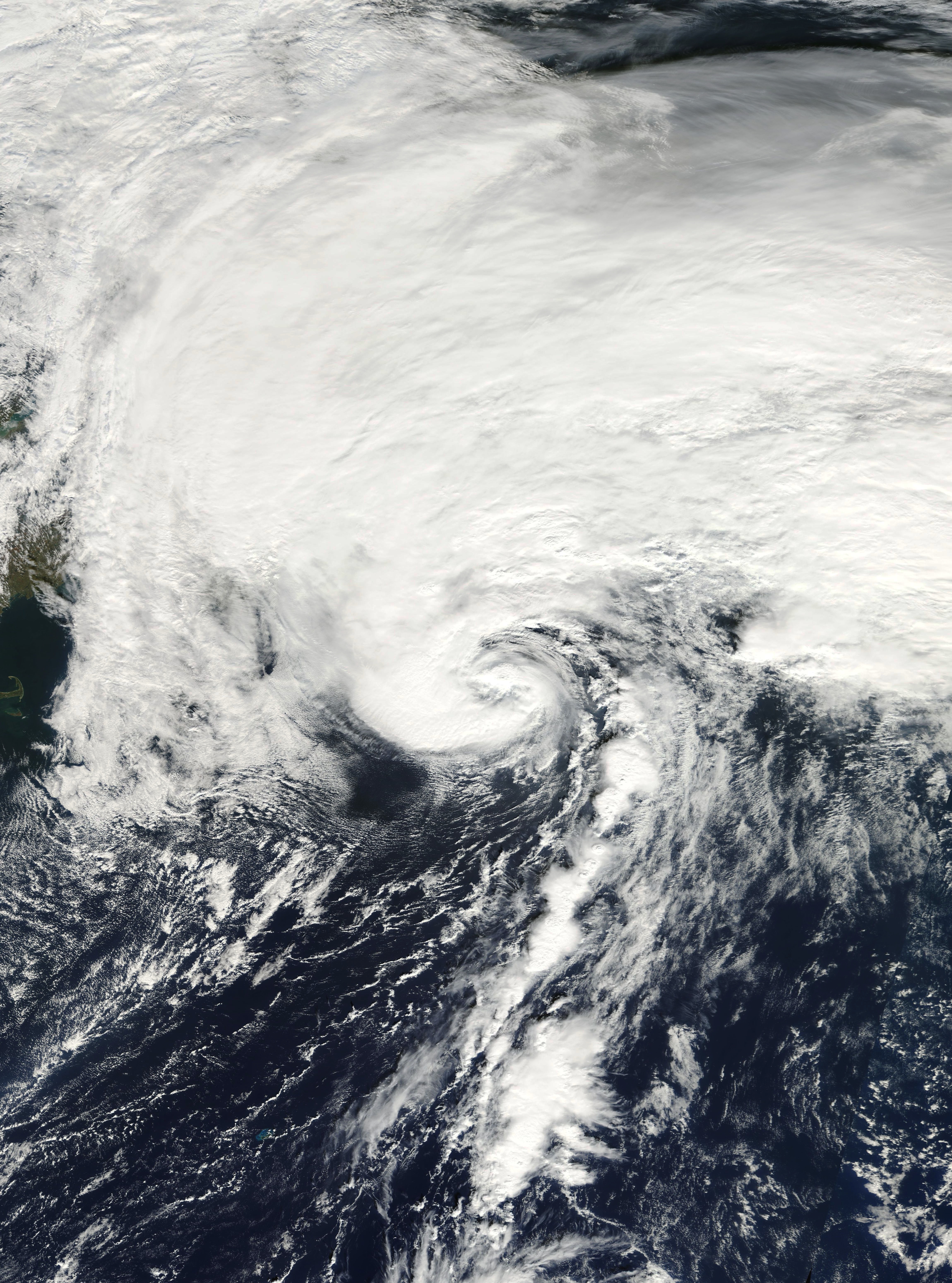
- Hurricane Michael at peak intensity on October 18

Meteorological history
- Formed: October 15, 2000
- Extratropical: October 19, 2000
- Dissipated: October 20, 2000

Category 2 hurricane
- 1-minute sustained (SSHWS/NWS)
- Highest winds: 100 mph (155 km/h)
- Lowest pressure: 965 mbar (hPa); 28.50 inHg

Overall effects
- Fatalities: None reported
- Damage: Unknown
- Areas affected: East Coast of the United States, Bermuda, Atlantic Canada
- IBTrACS
- Part of the 2000 Atlantic hurricane season

Hurricane Michael of the 2000 Atlantic hurricane season caused widespread, but relatively minor damage in Atlantic Canada. The seventeenth tropical cyclone, thirteenth named storm, and eighth hurricane of the season, Michael developed from a non-tropical system to the southwest of Bermuda on October 15. The system was initially subtropical, but rapidly acquired tropical characteristics by October 17. Michael quickly strengthened into a hurricane later that day. By October 20, Michael peaked as a Category 2 hurricane on the Saffir-Simpson hurricane wind scale at a relatively high latitude of 44°N. The storm weakened slightly to a Category 1 hurricane and became extratropical shortly before making landfall in Newfoundland on October 20.

As the intensity of Michael was equivalent to a Category 2 hurricane during landfall, high winds were reported throughout Atlantic Canada, especially in Newfoundland. Winds from the storm peaked at 172 km/h (107 mph) in St. Lawrence, Newfoundland; other locations across the island reported winds of 128 to 150 km/h (80 to 93 mph). High winds caused minor structure damage across Newfoundland, confined to vinyl siding peeled off, shattered windows, and unroofed houses. In addition, sporadic power outages were also reported from Corner Brook to St. John's. Michael also dropped rainfall across Atlantic Canada and in Maine. The rainfall was generally light, with much of the region reporting between 25 and 51 mm (0.98 and 2.01 in) of precipitation. Michael also produced high tides, accompanied by waves reported as high as 16.9 m (55 ft) by a buoy well offshore of Newfoundland.

== Meteorological history ==
Map plotting the storm's track and intensity, according to the Saffir–Simpson scale Map key Saffir–Simpson scale Tropical depression (≤38 mph, ≤62 km/h) Tropical storm (39–73 mph, 63–118 km/h) Category 1 (74–95 mph, 119–153 km/h) Category 2 (96–110 mph, 154–177 km/h) Category 3 (111–129 mph, 178–208 km/h) Category 4 (130–156 mph, 209–251 km/h) Category 5 (≥157 mph, ≥252 km/h) Unknown Storm type Tropical cyclone Subtropical cyclone Extratropical cyclone, remnant low, tropical disturbance, or monsoon depression

The system originated out of a non-tropical cold-core upper level low that drifted southward into the subtropics. The low interacted with a cold front, which resulted in the development of a stationary front over the Bahamas on October 10. As the cold low drifted southward, a surface low developed on October 12. The surface low remained mostly stationary until early on October 15 as it merged with the upper-level low and deepened while north of the Bahamas and east of the coast of Florida. Later that day, the system gained enough tropical characteristics and became organized enough to be classified as a subtropical depression. The storm remained stationary over warm water, with sea surface temperatures around 28 °C (82 °F), while it continued to gain additional tropical characteristics. Around 0000 UTC on October 16, it strengthened into a subtropical storm after satellite classifications showed a stronger storm. Later that day, the cyclone continued to develop as more thunderstorms formed and persisted near the low-level circulation.

Hurricane Michael intensifying over the Gulf Stream on October 18

By 0000 UTC on October 17, the transition was completed and Michael was reclassified as a tropical storm as supported by satellite classifications via the Dvorak technique. Shortly thereafter, the National Hurricane Center initiated advisories on Tropical Depression Seventeen; post-analysis later discovered it was actually a tropical storm. A well-defined eye quickly developed early on October 17 as Michael began to strengthen and continued to organize. That afternoon, Michael rapidly intensified further and was upgraded to a hurricane as Reconnaissance flights found winds of 120 km/h (75 mph). At that point, Michael began to move northward. While Michael was maintaining minimal hurricane status, the eye remained ragged, yet well-defined. Early on October 19, Michael briefly strengthened to 140 km/h (85 mph) before weakening slightly six hours later. Breaking into cooler water, Michael began its extratropical transition while accelerating to the northeast towards Newfoundland, which prevented significant weakening. The acceleration was caused by a shortwave trough embedded within strong southwesterly mid-level flow.

Unexpectedly, Michael began to rapidly intensify on October 19 while in extratropical transition. Later that day, a ship report in the eastern eyewall reported a minimum central pressure of 965 mbar (28.5 inHg) and maximum sustained winds of 155 km/h (100 mph), making Michael a Category 2 hurricane on the Saffir-Simpson hurricane scale. The sudden intensification was determined to have been as a result of baroclinic effects as it interacted with an incoming trough, which provided additional energy to counter the general weakening of hurricanes while in the high latitudes over sea-surface temperatures around 16 °C (61 °F). At 2300 UTC on October 19, shortly after completing its transition to an extratropical cyclone, Michael made landfall near Parsons Harbour, Newfoundland with winds of 155 km/h (100 mph). The extratropical system gradually weakened as it tracked across Newfoundland on October 20, and slowed down considerably with the presence of the trough. The storm was absorbed by another extratropical low just north of Newfoundland that afternoon.

== Impact ==
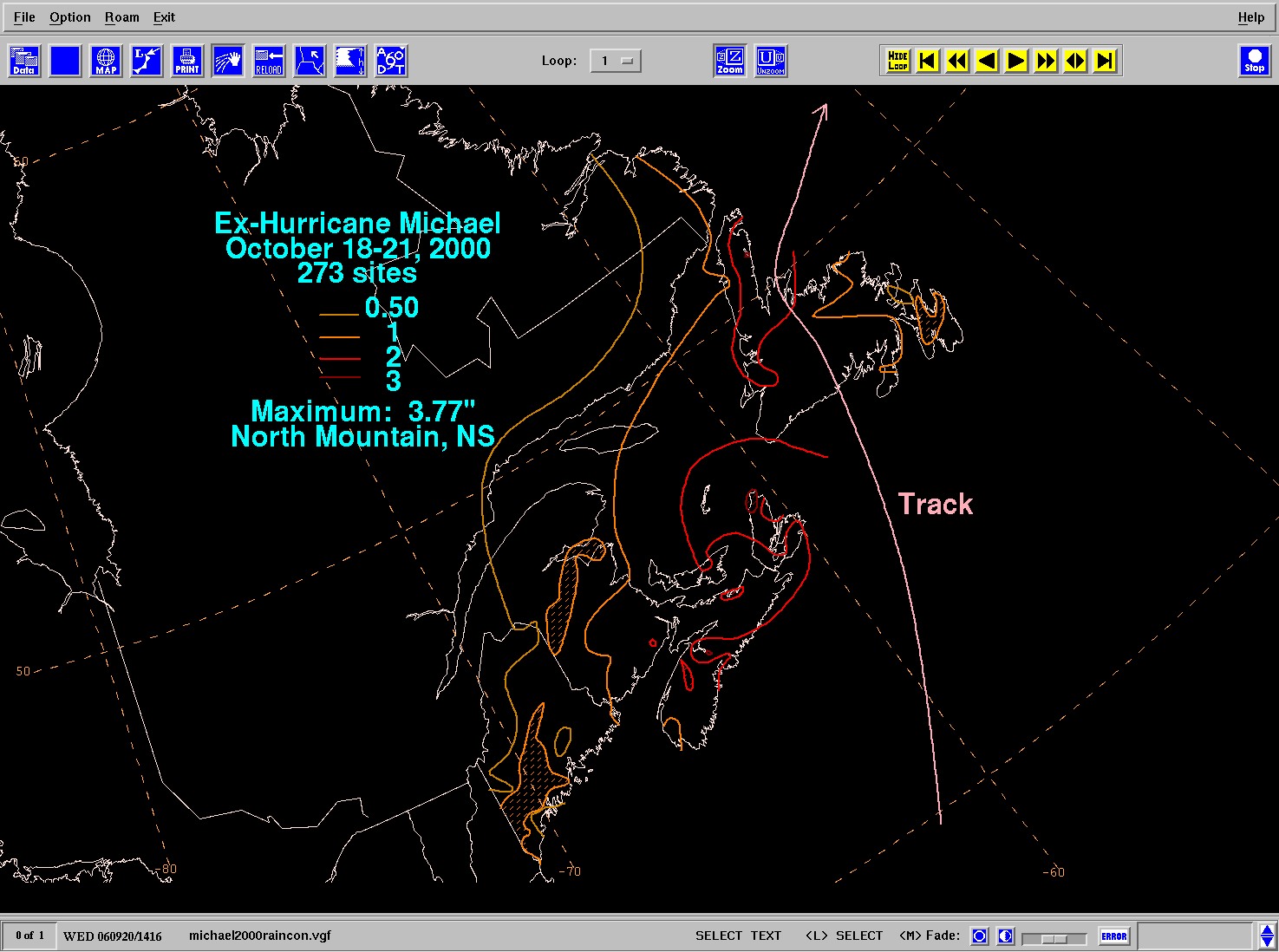
Rain accumulations with Michael

Because it was unknown that Michael became extratropical before landfall, it was initially considered the first tropical cyclone to strike Newfoundland since Hurricane Luis in 1995. Furthermore, Michael was also considered the first hurricane to make landfall in Canada since Hurricane Hortense in 1996. When the Meteorological Service of Canada and the National Research Council flew a Convair research flight into Michael on October 19, it was the first successful research flight made into a tropical cyclone by those agencies. Subsequent flights have been made into Tropical Storm Karen, Hurricane Isabel (while inland), Hurricane Juan, and Hurricane Ophelia.

=== Newfoundland ===
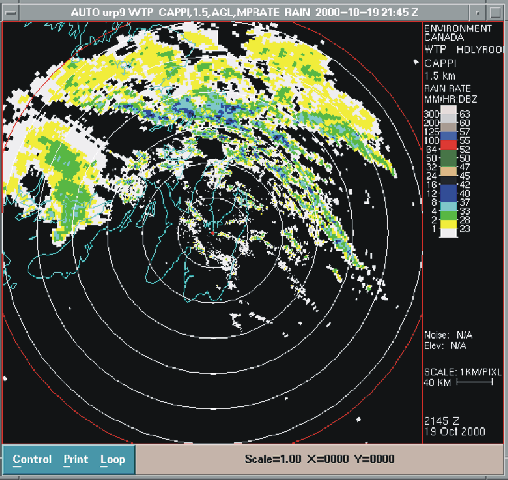
Radar image of Hurricane Michael over Newfoundland.

In advance of the storm, the Newfoundland Weather Centre posted wind warnings, gale warnings, storm warnings, and hurricane warnings throughout Newfoundland. Rainfall advisories were also issued in portions of the East Coast, Central Newfoundland, the South Coast, and the West Coast. Offshore, storm force wind warnings were declared on October 19 for Newfoundland waters. Several Special Weather Statements were also posted.

Light to moderate damage was reported throughout Newfoundland, primarily as a result of the strong winds. The entire region was affected by Michael, though the majority of the damage was confined to small communities east of where the storm made landfall, including Gaultois, Harbour Breton, Hermitage and English Harbour West. These areas reported significant power outages and minor structural damage; vinyl siding was peeled off, windows were shattered, and roof shingles were torn off in some localized locations. The most severe damage was in Gaultois, where several roofs were torn off and trees were uprooted. Wind damage also occurred in the St. John's Metropolitan Area, where a Sobeys store in Conception Bay South had broken windows. Sporadic power outages were reported throughout the island, as far east as St. John's, and as far west as Corner Brook. As the storm struck at low tide, storm surge was insignificant. However, just prior to landfall, waves on the coast of Newfoundland reached heights of 7–8 m (23–26 ft). Rainfall near the storm's track was generally around 30 mm (1.2 in), though further inland, precipitation reached 75 mm (3.0 in). Rainfall from the hurricane amounted to 77 mm (3.0 in) at Englee, a small fishing community on the Great Northern Peninsula. Wind gusts peaked at 172 km/h (107 mph) at St. Lawrence, with other reports varying between 128 km/h (80 mph) and 150 km/h (93 mph). Despite severe winds, damage was relatively light due to high construction standards in Newfoundland, where winter storms routinely result in hurricane-force winds, as well as the sparse population of the area affected.

The tug Atlantic Elm lost its tow to the unmanned barge Portland Star on October 19. The barge was carrying over 18,000 tonnes of cement and diesel fuel and was later reported to have sunk in the Fortune Bay. Damage was reported to numerous pleasure craft around the bay due to the waves; two sailboats were toppled. Also, ferry service between Newfoundland and Nova Scotia was disrupted. Several offshore buoys and ships reported high winds and low barometric pressure, as well as waves of up to 16.9 m (55 ft).

=== Elsewhere ===
On October 14 and October 15, the frontal boundary associated with the hurricane's precursor dropped heavy rainfall on Bermuda, amounting to 76 mm (3.0 in). However, as a tropical cyclone, Michael remained far from the island. Impact outside Newfoundland was generally light. However, rainfall was greater in some areas of Nova Scotia than in Newfoundland, where precipitation reached 95.7 mm (3.77 in) over North Mountain. Light rain was also reported in New Brunswick, Prince Edward Island, and Quebec. Effects from the storm in the United States were minimal, limited to light rainfall in the state of Maine which totaled less than 51 mm (2.0 in).

== See also ==
- List of Canada hurricanes
- Timeline of the 2000 Atlantic hurricane season
