= October 2000 Atlantic Canada storm complex =

October 2000 Canada storm complex
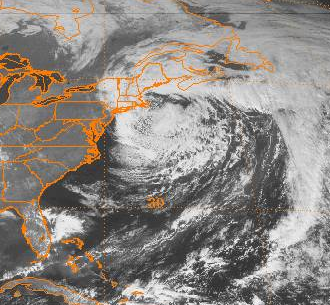
- Satellite image of the storm on October 30

Meteorological history
- Formed: October 28, 2000
- Dissipated: November, 2000a

Extratropical cyclone
- Maximum snowfall or ice accretion: 24 inches (61 cm), Baxter State Park, Maine

Overall effects
- Areas affected: New England, Atlantic Canada

The October 2000 Atlantic Canada storm complex was reported as the worst storm in Prince Edward Island in 30 years. Environment Canada considered as one of the ten most significant weather events in Canada in the year. It moved southeastward from Atlantic Canada in late October 2000, producing high snowfall totals in Maine. It absorbed an unnamed subtropical cyclone, and remained nearly stationary in the Gulf of Maine for over a week. Some locations in Atlantic Canada reported record durations of continuous cloud cover. Daily amounts of rainfall produced flooding in Nova Scotia, while a high storm surge associated with the storm washed out roads in New Brunswick and Prince Edward Island. The storm produced wind gusts that peaked at 104 mph (168 km/h) in Newfoundland, and across the region there were scattered power outages.

== Meteorological history ==
The coastal storm moved southward over southeastern Canada on October 28. Around the same time, a subtropical storm (a storm with both tropical and extratropical characteristics) was moving northeastward in the western Atlantic Ocean. A powerful cold front moved eastward from New England and weakened the subtropical storm. The larger extratropical storm near Canada absorbed the previously subtropical storm on October 29, which remained stationary for over 24 hours near Nova Scotia. It later moved to the southwest before turning to the east in the Gulf of Maine on October 30. The system remained in the region for over a week, producing rainfall and cloudy skies across Atlantic Canada for an extended period of time.

== Impact ==
Before affecting Canada with high winds and waves, the storm system produced heavy early-season snowfall totals in New England and southeastern Canada. In Baxter State Park in northern Maine, snowfall totals reached 24 in (610 mm). The combination of snow and wind gusts of 40 mph (64 km/h) broke tree limbs and caused power outages. Further south, winds of 55 mph (89 km/h) struck eastern Massachusetts, which downed several power poles; about 1,200 people lost power.

Across Atlantic Canada, the extratropical storm produced strong winds, with a peak gust of 104 mph (168 km/h) recorded in Wreckhouse, Newfoundland and Labrador. Heavy rainfall was reported across the region, including over 6.30 in (160 mm) of precipitation in Nova Scotia. Cape Breton Island reported 19 days of rainfall and cloudy skies. Several cities in the region reported a record duration of continuously cloudy skies, as well as daily rainfall records. This prompted Environment Canada to list the storm as one of the top ten weather events in 2000. In addition, the storm produced record storm surges in eastern New Brunswick and northern Prince Edward Island, which caused significant flooding. Wave heights reached 46 ft (14 m) in the Gulf of St. Lawrence. The storm was the most damaging in the year in Atlantic Canada, with a damage total of $3 million (2000 CAD). In Prince Edward Island, fishermen considered the storm the worst in over 30 years.

In Nova Scotia, the high storm surge flooded the Cabot Trail in several locations, and in two cities coastal roads were washed out. Several days of persistent rainfall resulted in house flooding, sinkholes, and sewer backups. In neighboring New Brunswick, high winds left about 7,000 people without power along a 60 mi (100 km) portion of the coastline. High seas damaged wharves in Miramichi Bay. In Escuminac, New Brunswick, the surge reached 7.94 ft (2.43 m), just shy of the record set in November 1988. The nor'easter occurred ten months after a similarly powerful storm struck the region. The October storm produced record river flooding from the combination of strong waves and winds, and likewise damaged coastal structures. The provincial government paid about $2.4 million in insurance claims due to the storm.

Strong wind gusts in Prince Edward Island, reaching 73 mph (118 km/h), downed trees and damaged houses, causing power outages. Roads and bridges were closed across the island, while waves of 36 ft (11 m) in height capsized boats. The waves also caused beach erosion in the island which damaged at least eight highways. In Newfoundland, high winds caused a brief power outage in Corner Brook, and removed a house from its foundation in Stephenville.

== See also ==
- November 2001 Atlantic Canada storm complex
- 1991 Perfect Storm
