= Hurricane Gordon (2000) =

Category 1 Atlantic hurricane in 2000

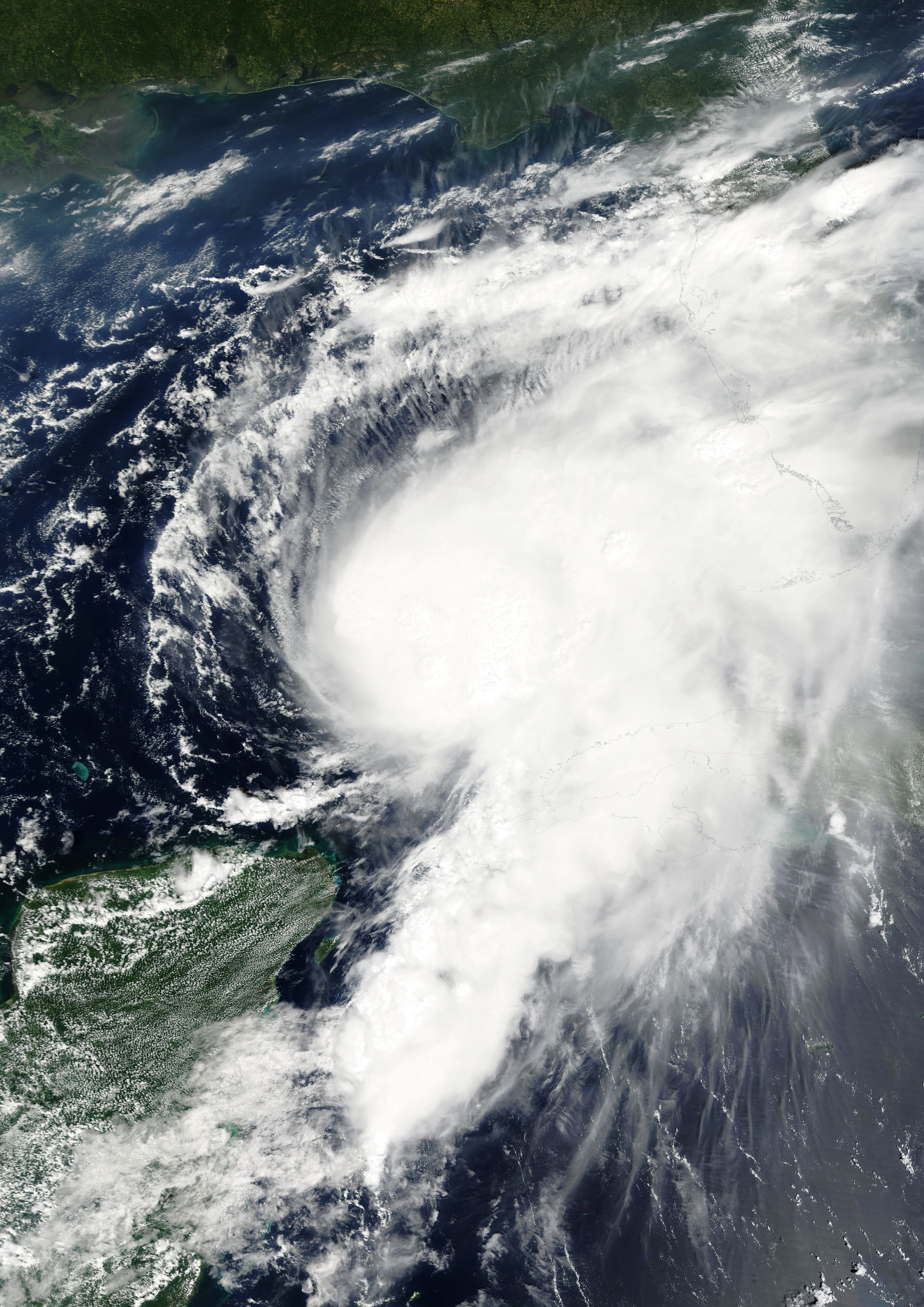
- Gordon shortly before becoming a hurricane on September 16

Meteorological history
- Formed: September 14, 2000
- Extratropical: September 18, 2000
- Dissipated: September 21, 2000

Category 1 hurricane
- 1-minute sustained (SSHWS/NWS)
- Highest winds: 80 mph (130 km/h)
- Lowest pressure: 981 mbar (hPa); 28.97 inHg

Overall effects
- Fatalities: 26
- Damage: $10.8 million (2000 USD)
- Areas affected: Central America (particularly Belize), Yucatán Peninsula, Cuba, East Coast of the United States, Atlantic Canada
- IBTrACS
- Part of the 2000 Atlantic hurricane season

Hurricane Gordon caused minor damage in the Eastern United States. The seventh named storm and fourth hurricane of the 2000 Atlantic hurricane season, Gordon developed in the extreme western Caribbean Sea from a tropical wave on September 14. Shortly thereafter, the depression moved inland over the Yucatán Peninsula and later emerged into the Gulf of Mexico on September 15. The depression began to quickly organize, and by early on September 16, it was upgraded to Tropical Storm Gordon. After becoming a tropical storm, Gordon continued to intensify and was reclassified as a hurricane about 24 hours later; eventually, the storm peaked as an 80 mph (130 km/h) Category 1 hurricane. However, southwesterly upper-level winds caused Gordon to weaken as it approached land, and it was downgraded to a tropical storm by late on September 17. At 0300 UTC on September 18, Gordon made landfall near Cedar Key, Florida as a strong tropical storm. After moving inland, Gordon rapidly weakened and had deteriorated to tropical depression status by nine hours later. Later that day, Gordon merged with a frontal boundary while centered over Georgia.

Prior to becoming a tropical cyclone, the precursor tropical wave caused severe flooding in Guatemala, killing 23 people. While crossing the Yucatán Peninsula, the storm dropped heavy rainfall, with a few areas experiencing more than 10 inches (250 mm) of precipitation. Similarly, portions of western Cuba reported rainfall totals reaching 10 inches (250 mm). Gordon brought moderate storm surge to the west coast of Florida; one person drowned due to rough seas. Numerous trees and power lines sustained damage, which left 120,000 people without electricity. In the Tampa Bay area and Cedar Key, minor roof damage to houses and street flooding occurred. In addition, two tornadoes caused some damage in Cape Coral and Ponce Inlet. Elsewhere, affects were minimal, though two indirect fatalities occurred in North Carolina, and minor flooding was reported in South Carolina, Virginia, West Virginia, Maryland, Delaware, Pennsylvania, New Jersey, and New York. Overall, Gordon caused $10.8 million (2000 USD) (Note: All damage figures are in 2000 USD, unless otherwise noted) in damage and 26 fatalities.

== Meteorological history ==
Map plotting the storm's track and intensity, according to the Saffir–Simpson scale Map key Saffir–Simpson scale Tropical depression (≤38 mph, ≤62 km/h) Tropical storm (39–73 mph, 63–118 km/h) Category 1 (74–95 mph, 119–153 km/h) Category 2 (96–110 mph, 154–177 km/h) Category 3 (111–129 mph, 178–208 km/h) Category 4 (130–156 mph, 209–251 km/h) Category 5 (≥157 mph, ≥252 km/h) Unknown Storm type Tropical cyclone Subtropical cyclone Extratropical cyclone, remnant low, tropical disturbance, or monsoon depression

A tropical wave moved off the coast of Africa on September 4 and tracked westward across the Atlantic Ocean without strengthening. On September 9 and 10, the tropical wave moved through the Lesser Antilles bringing local heavy rainfall and wind gusts reaching 35 mph (56 km/h). The wave then moved west-northwest and developed a well-defined center on September 12 in the central Caribbean Sea. Satellite photos on September 13 indicated that the convective pattern in the system was disorganized. However, later that day, a broad low pressure area had developed along axis of the wave, based on surface observations about 118 mi (190 km) southeast of Cozumel, Mexico. Early on September 14, it was estimated from satellite imagery that the low pressure system was near tropical depression strength, even though the convection was still disorganized.

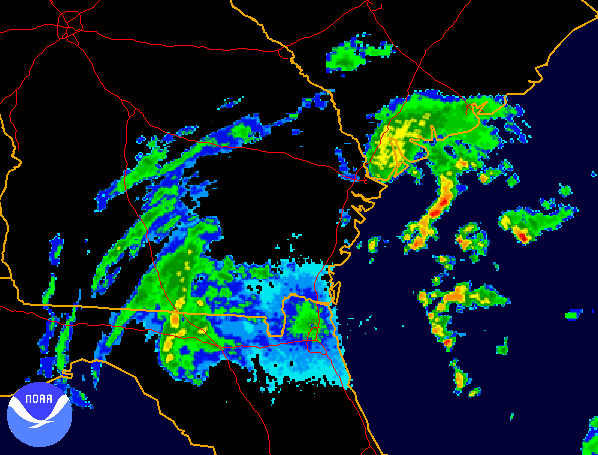
Tropical Storm Gordon as seen by radar over the Southeastern United States

The system was classified as Tropical Depression Eleven at 1200 UTC on September 14, based on reports from reconnaissance aircraft. Later that day, the developing depression moved inland over the Yucatán Peninsula. The depression moved slowly to the northwest without emerging over water, therefore, the depression did not gain intensity. At this time, the predicted track for the system was highly uncertain due to different computer models forecasting different tracks. The official forecast predicted a northwestward movement into the western Gulf of Mexico, but some models predicted the low to move towards northwestern Florida, while another model predicted the low to move southwards into the Bay of Campeche. Late on September 15, the depression moved off the north coast of the Yucatán Peninsula and into the Gulf of Mexico, where it showed signs of better organization. The future track was still very uncertain, though a few computer models forecasted for the depression to move northeastwards towards Florida, resulting in an eastward shift on official forecast. Early on September 16, data from Hurricane Hunter aircraft indicated that the storm had strengthened to about 60 mph (97 km/h) at the surface, and the barometric pressure had fallen to 1,003 mbar (29.6 inHg). Therefore, it was upgraded to Tropical Storm Gordon at 0000 UTC.

Upon being a tropical storm on September 16, Gordon was moving northeastward towards the Big Bend of Florida, continuing to slowly intensify. The official forecast track was shifted further east, forecasting Gordon to track to the northeast. Early on September 17, a ship reported winds of 75 mph (121 km/h), indicating that Gordon had attained hurricane strength. Gordon reached a peak intensity of 80 mph (130 km/h), six hours later while located about 190 mi (310 km) southwest of Tampa, Florida. Later that day, Gordon began to weaken due to entrainment from the south and increasing vertical wind shear. Gordon was downgraded to a tropical storm as it neared the Florida coast. The storm made landfall just northwest of Cedar Key, Florida, at 0300 UTC on September 18 with winds of 60 mph (95 mph). After moving inland, interaction with the land and cool, dry air further weakened the storm. Gordon weakened to a tropical depression nine hours after landfall, and six hours later, it had merged with a frontal system over southeastern Georgia. The storm also transitioned into an extratropical cyclone, as it moved to the northeast. On September 21, the system merged with a large extratropical system over eastern Canada.

== Preparations ==
=== Florida ===
Residents in Florida loaded up supplies on September 16 when the National Hurricane Center issued a hurricane watch along Florida's west coast from Bonita Beach to the Suwannee River. The hurricane watch extended northward and westward later in the day to Apalachicola. Hurricane warnings were initiated on September 17 for areas along the Florida coast from Anna Maria Island to Ochlockonee River. Tropical storm warnings were issued south of Anna Maria Island to Bonita Beach and west of Ochlockonee River to Indian Pass. Tropical storm warnings were also issued along the east coast of the United States from Titusville in Florida to Little River Inlet in South Carolina. The Florida Division of Emergency Management in Tallahassee issued a mandatory evacuation in Hernando County, while voluntary evacuations were called for some of the coastal areas along Florida's west coast. Anticipating that Gordon will make landfall and move inland, two tornado watches were in effect from Sarasota to Naples, and tornado warnings were issued from Orlando to Vero Beach. Flash flood warnings were also in effect in parts of Florida.

On September 17, Governor of Florida Jeb Bush activated emergency response teams. In various areas of Florida, spokesmen for the Emergency Operations Center advised residents to prepare for the storm and monitor the track of the approaching hurricane. At Cape Canaveral, National Aeronautics and Space Administration (NASA) also took precautions against the hurricane, as the storm could force NASA to move Space Shuttle Discovery off its launch pad at the seaside and into the hangar. Many evacuations took place once Gordon crossed the Florida coast. The Emergency Operations Center in Florida said authorities had arranged mandatory evacuations for coastal regions in the Citrus, Franklin, Hernando, Levy and Taylor counties, while also recommending voluntary evacuations for numerous other counties. The Red Cross reported that the storm forced 500 people to seek refuge in shelters. Major League Baseball postponed a baseball game in Tampa against the Oakland Athletics. Also, many flights were canceled at the Tampa International Airport. About 200 National Guardsmen were called to help clean up the damage in flooded areas. Officials forced schools in six counties – Gilchrist, Columbia, Citrus, Taylor, Lafayette and Suwannee to close down for one day.

=== Gulf of Mexico ===
Chevron Corporation and Shell Oil Company evacuated offshore crews from the Gulf of Mexico on September 16 in preparation for a possible hurricane threat from Hurricane Gordon, even though there was little effect on oil and gas production before that day. The Chevron Corporation expected the number of people working in the Gulf to reduce from 1,700 on September 16 to 450 the next day. Gordon also forced the cruise liner Carnival Sensation, consisting of 2,200 passengers and 900 crew members, to remain at sea for one day. Residents in Alabama, Mississippi and Louisiana were also advised by radio to keep track of the approaching hurricane.

== Impact ==
=== Latin America ===
As a tropical wave, Gordon killed 23 people in Guatemala mainly due to flooding and landslides in mountainous regions. While drifting over the Yucatán Peninsula of Mexico, Gordon dropped heavy rainfall peaking at 9 inches (230 mm) in Cancún. The storm also dumped heavy rainfall in western Cuba with totals reaching 10 inches (250 mm). However, no flooding was reported in either the Yucatán Peninsula or Cuba.

=== United States ===
==== Florida ====
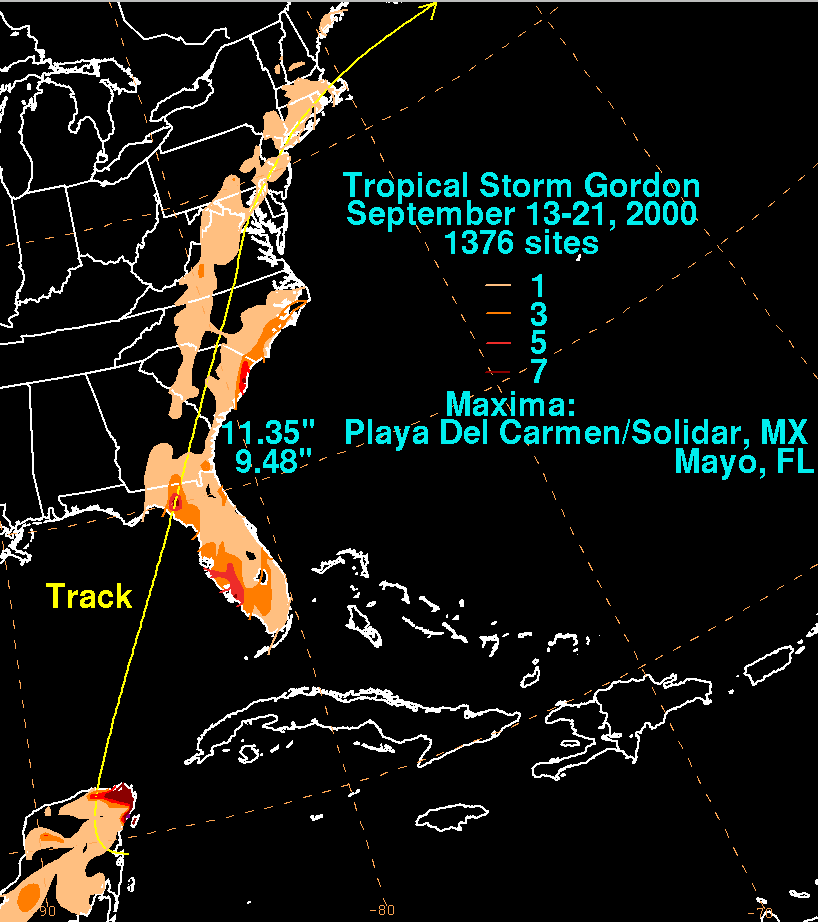
Total rainfall from Gordon

Before Gordon made landfall in Florida, one death occurred when a surfer drowned in the raging seas offshore Pensacola. Other than that, minimal effects occurred to the west of the storm's path. Light rainfall was reported, with 0.71 inches (18 mm) in Tallahassee and 4.83 inches (123 mm) in Cross City recorded. Lying near in the path of the storm, rainfall from the Gordon in the United States peaked at 9.48 inches (241 mm) in Mayo. Winds in the region were also light, with a sustained wind speed of 33 mph (53 km/h) and gusts to 42 mph (68 km/h) reported in Cross City. In Perry, sustained winds reached 28 mph (45 km/h) and gusts of 39 mph (63 km/h) occurred. At the C-MAN Station in nearby Keaton Beach, a wind gust of 41 mph (66 km/h) was reported.

Although the storm made landfall near Cedar Key, no wind observations were taken there, though the offshore Coastal-Marine Automated Network (C-MAN) Station reported winds of 46 mph (74 km/h) and gusts to 68 mph (109 km/h). Tides were also light, reaching 3.9 feet (1.2 m) in Cedar Key. Similarly, precipitation was also light, with 4.8 inches (120 mm) of rain reported at Cedar Key. Minor roof and tree damage occurred in Levy County, totaling to about $100,000. In Citrus County, winds downed a few trees, powerlines, and tree branches between Sulpher Springs and Ozello, though damage was less than $25,000. Ten homes were flooded and a few trees and powerlines were downed, resulting in about $100,000 in losses. Roofs were damaged at 15 villas in Pasco County, while falling trees struck vehicles parked at a subdivision in New Port Richey; damage in that county totaled to $250,000. Winds and minor floods damaged 51 single-family homes, 32 mobile homes, 27 multi-family homes, and 24 businesses in Pinellas County, resulting in nearly $500,000 in losses. In addition, nearly 1 foot (0.30 m) of water inundated coastal roads between St. Pete Beach and Clearwater. Two locations reported sustained tropical storm force winds in St. Petersburg.

Due to high tides, a large portion of the west coast of Florida from Pinellas County southward experienced coastal flooding. On September 17, 1 foot (0.30 m) of water covered Bayshore Boulevard near downtown Tampa. The Courtney Campbell Causeway, which connects Clearwater and Tampa, was closed for almost four hours due to storm surge flooding. 40 houses in low-lying areas between Ruskin and Riverview were damaged by flooding from the storm surge. Several other houses in Hillsborough County were damaged by toppled trees and large falling branches. Winds throughout the state of Florida left 120,000 people without electricity, mostly in the Tampa metropolitan area. Overall, damage in Hillsborough County totaled to nearly $500,000. Further south in Manatee County, storm surge and high tides flooded 25 homes and businesses in Bradenton Beach. 60 mph (97 km/h) wind gusts in Coquina Beach toppled lifeguard towers and destroyed an anemometer. Several homes in Anna Maria suffered light to moderate roof damage due to winds. Losses in Manatee County reached almost $500,000.

In Sarasota County, 8 feet (2.4 m) waves ripped a 20 feet (6.1 m) section and three 50 feet (15 m) concrete pilings off the Venice Municipal Fishing Pier, resulting in nearly $600,000 in damage. Between 1 and 2 feet (0.30 and 0.61 m) of water covered coastal roads on Siesta and Casey Keys. Minor beach erosion occurred in Charlotte County and a sustained wind speed of 37 mph (60 km/h) was reported in Punta Gorda. Despite effects in adjacent counties, there was minimal damage in Charlotte County. In Lee County, tropical storm force winds damaged roofs, awnings, and lanais at nine homes; winds also toppled several large trees and branches, and downed power lines across Cape Coral and Fort Myers. A tornado rated F1 on the Fujita scale touched down near Sanibel. It caused extensive damage to two condominium complexes, and 24 nearby homes. Further along its path, the tornado damaged a few other homes and carports, while also toppling or spanning palm trees. Gordon also spawned two tornadoes that touched down as it made landfall. One tornado touched down near Cape Coral, Florida, damaging three homes, while an F0 tornado touched down near Ponce Inlet in Volusia County, Florida, causing minimal damage, mainly to trees and roofs.

In Citrus and Levy Counties, residents who were evacuated on the day when Gordon struck the coast were allowed early the next day to return to their homes after the storm passed.

==== Georgia, The Carolinas, and Virginia ====
Despite the rain, Gordon did little to relieve an ongoing drought in Georgia. The remnants of Tropical Storm Gordon brought heavy rainfall to South Carolina, with spotter reports and radar estimates indicating over 8 inches (200 mm) in Georgetown. Numerous streets were reported flooded by emergency managers, while according to newspaper accounts, there was standing water of more than 2–3 feet (0.61–0.91 m) in depth in many areas. Many motorists were forced to abandon their cars, several of which sustained water damage. Numerous homes were flooded in the town, especially on Hawkins Street. Additionally, many businesses were forced to close for the day along Front and Fraser Streets. One injury was reported when a policeman had a heart attack after the flood waters entered his home. In Charleston County, 6 to 10 inches (150 to 250 mm) of rain fell. Flooding occurred in the northeastern portions of the county, in combination with more than 8 inches (200 mm) of precipitation that had fallen less than two weeks earlier. Water entered homes and businesses in the McClellanville area and inundated a portion of U.S. Route 17, causing that section to be closed for most of the day on September 18. Sustained winds of 29 mph (47 km/h) and gusts up to 37 mph (60 km/h) in Charleston downed a few trees in coastal areas. Flooding in North Carolina occurred as the storm moved up the East Coast of the United States, indirectly killing two people when a car lost control and struck a tractor trailer during the storm. Two men in a fishing boat were also reported missing. Rainfall in North Carolina peaked at 5.71 inches (145 mm) in Hoffman Forest.

The remnants of Gordon moved across the Virginia on September 19. Rainfall totals throughout the state peaked at 4.38 inches (111 mm) in Rocky Branch. The daily rainfall was broken at Washington Dulles International Airport after 1.24 inches (31 mm) of rain fell. Isaac Creek overflowed its banks near Cross Junction, flooding Route 689. Happy Creek overflowed its banks in Front Royal and flooded Eighth Street. Across Warren County, Ritenour Hollow Road and Oregon Hollow Road were closed by high water. High water was reported on U.S. Route 11 south of Woodstock.

==== Mid-Atlantic and West Virginia ====
By September 19, the remnants of Gordon reached Maryland. In Carroll County, 4 hour rainfall amounts include 2.78 inches (71 mm) in Westminster, 2.48 inches (63 mm) at Piney Run Park, and 2.38 inches (60 mm) Manchester. As a result, a few roads in the county were closed due to water inundation. In other areas, similar precipitation totals were reported, including 2.83 inches (72 mm) near Columbia, 2.16 inches (55 mm) in Emmitsburg, 2.11 inches (54 mm) in Sharpsburg, 2.08 inches (53 mm) in Laurel, 2.05 inches (52 mm) at Brighton Dam, 1.72 inches (44 mm) in Ellicott City and Hagerstown, 1.65 inches (42 mm) in Frederick, and 1.5 inches (38 mm) in Lisbon. Doppler radar estimates indicate that around 3 inches (76 mm) of rain fell in only 3 hours in portions of Cecil, Kent, Queen Anne's County, resulting in minor flooding in poor drainage or low-lying areas. In Delaware, precipitation totals at Newark and New Castle Airport both reached 1.82 inches (46 mm). This resulted in minor flooding along the Christina River in New Castle County and nearby low-lying areas. In West Virginia, the storm produced locally heavy rainfall in the Eastern Panhandle, peaking at 1.82 inches (46 mm) in Berkeley County.

The remnants of Gordon dropped heavy rain across southeast Pennsylvania on September 19, resulting in flooding in low-lying areas. The heaviest rain fell near Willow Grove NAS, located in Horsham Township, Montgomery County. In Bucks County, stream flooding was reported in the Little Neshaminy Creek Basin in Warrington and Warminster Townships. The Pennypack Creek overflowed in Montgomery County and damaged parked cars at an elementary school in Hatboro. Flood waters also entered several rooms of the Old Mill Inn. In Horsham Township, homes on County Line Road were flooded, including one that had 4 feet (1.2 m) of water in its garage. Storm totals included 2.64 inches (67 mm) at the Willow Grove NAS, 2.6 inches (66 mm) in Southampton, 2.46 inches (62 mm) at King of Prussia, 2.22 inches (56 mm) in Reading, 2.18 inches (55 mm) at Northeast Philadelphia Airport, 1.69 inches (43 mm) at Neshaminy Falls, 1.66 inches (42 mm) in Exton, and 1.57 inches (40 mm) in Furlong. Heavy precipitation fell in west central and southwest New Jersey, causing poor drainage flooding in low-lying areas. The heaviest rain fell in Mercer County and caused some minor flooding along the Assunpink Creek. Roadway flooding along U.S. Route 130 was reported in Collingswood. Rainfall totals included 2.14 inches (54 mm) in Trenton, 2.1 inches (53 mm) in Pennsauken, 2 inches (51 mm) in Somerdale and Windsor, 1.74 inches (44 mm) in Mount Laurel, and 1.66 inches (42 mm) in Mount Holly. Rainfall in Orange County, New York of 2 to 3 inches (51 to 76 mm) caused minor stream flooding, such as along New York State Route 132 in Woodbury.

== See also ==
- Other storms of the same name
- List of North Carolina hurricanes (2000–present)
- Timeline of the 2000 Atlantic hurricane season
- Hurricane Hermine
