= Turtle Beach =

Turtle Beach may refer to:

== Places ==
- İztuzu Beach in Dalyan, Turkey, also known as "Turtle Beach"
- Turtle Beach (Florida), south of Sarasota, USA
- Turtle Beach, Northern Territory (also known as Ngumuy), in the Gove Peninsula, Australia

== Other uses ==
- Turtle Beach (novel), a 1981 novel by Australian writer Blanche d'Alpuget
- Turtle Beach (film), a 1992 Australian drama film, based on the novel
- Turtle Beach Corporation, an American sound card and headphone manufacturer, based in San Diego, California
