= List of storms named Gordon =

The name Gordon has been used for eleven tropical cyclones worldwide: six in the Atlantic Ocean, four in the Western Pacific Ocean, and once in the South Pacific Ocean.

In the Atlantic:

- Hurricane Gordon (1994) – killed 1,122 in Haiti, and 23 in other nations. Damage in the United States was $400 million, and damage in Haiti and Cuba was severe.
- Hurricane Gordon (2000) – formed near Guatemala, cut across the Yucatán Peninsula and later hit Florida as a tropical storm; Killed 23 in Guatemala and one in Florida
- Hurricane Gordon (2006) – formed in the central North Atlantic and crossed the Azores; peaked as a Category 3 major hurricane
- Hurricane Gordon (2012) – a strong Category 2 hurricane which passed over the eastern Azores, striking Santa Maria Island as a Category 1.
- Tropical Storm Gordon (2018) – formed near the Florida Keys and affected South Florida, killing two. Then made landfall west of the Alabama-Mississippi border as a strong tropical storm
- Tropical Storm Gordon (2024) – weak storm that formed in the Atlantic and didn't affect land

In the Western Pacific:

- Tropical Storm Gordon (1979) (T7910, 07W, Herming) – Strong tropical storm which made landfall in China.
- Typhoon Gordon (1982) (T8216, 16W) – Category 3 typhoon with no known effects on land.
- Tropical Storm Gordon (1985) (T8527, 24W) – Weak tropical storm which made landfall in Vietnam.
- Typhoon Gordon (1989) (T8908, 08W, Goring) – Powerful Category 5 super typhoon which crossed northern Luzon at peak intensity before making landfall southwest of Hong Kong as a strong tropical storm. 306 people were killed by Gordon, and 120,000 were left homeless in the Philippines.

In the South Pacific:

- Cyclone Gordon (1979)

Following the 1978-79 season, the name Gordon was retired from further use on the rotating South Pacific tropical system naming lists
