= Typhoon Gordon =

Pacific typhoon in 1989

Typhoon Gordon (Goring)
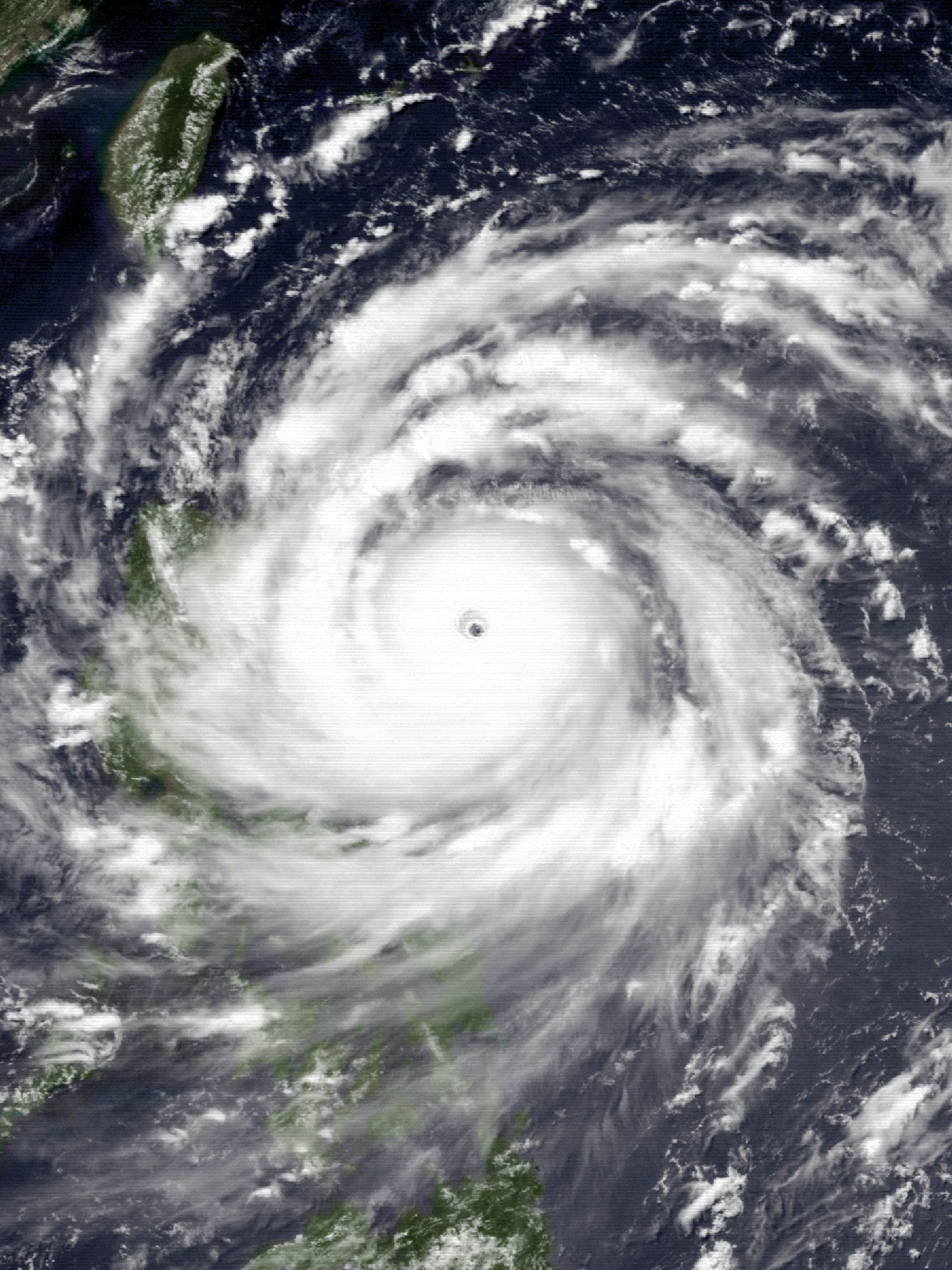
- Gordon approaching Luzon at peak intensity on July 15

Meteorological history
- Formed: July 9, 1989
- Dissipated: July 19, 1989

Very strong typhoon
- 10-minute sustained (JMA)
- Highest winds: 185 km/h (115 mph)
- Lowest pressure: 915 hPa (mbar); 27.02 inHg

Category 5-equivalent super typhoon
- 1-minute sustained (SSHWS/JTWC)
- Highest winds: 260 km/h (160 mph)
- Lowest pressure: 898 hPa (mbar); 26.52 inHg

Overall effects
- Fatalities: 306 total
- Damage: $381 million
- Areas affected: Philippines, Hong Kong, Taiwan, Macao, and China
- IBTrACS
- Part of the 1989 Pacific typhoon season

Typhoon Gordon, known in the Philippines as Super Typhoon Goring, was a powerful tropical cyclone that caused widespread damage and loss of life in the Philippines and Southern China in July 1989. Gordon developed into a tropical depression near the Northern Mariana Islands on July 9 and quickly intensified as it tracked west-southwestward. On July 13, the storm attained typhoon status and subsequently underwent a period of rapid intensification. By July 15, the storm attained its peak strength as a Category 5 equivalent super typhoon with winds estimated at 260 km/h (160 mph). After striking the northern Philippines, Gordon moved through the South China Sea and slowly weakened. On July 18, the storm made landfall in southern China and was last noted the following day as it dissipated over land.

Throughout Gordon's path from the Philippines to China, the storm caused widespread damage and loss of life. Across the Philippines, 90 people were killed by the typhoon and an estimated 120,000 people were left homeless. Though a weaker storm when it struck China, damage was more severe due to extensive flooding. Several coastal cities were completely inundated. Throughout the country, at least 200 people died and losses reached 1.2 billion yuan ($319 million USD). (Note: All monetary values are in 1989 USD, Philippine pesos, or Chinese Yuan) Additionally, 14 people drowned offshore and 2 others died in Hong Kong.

== Meteorological history ==
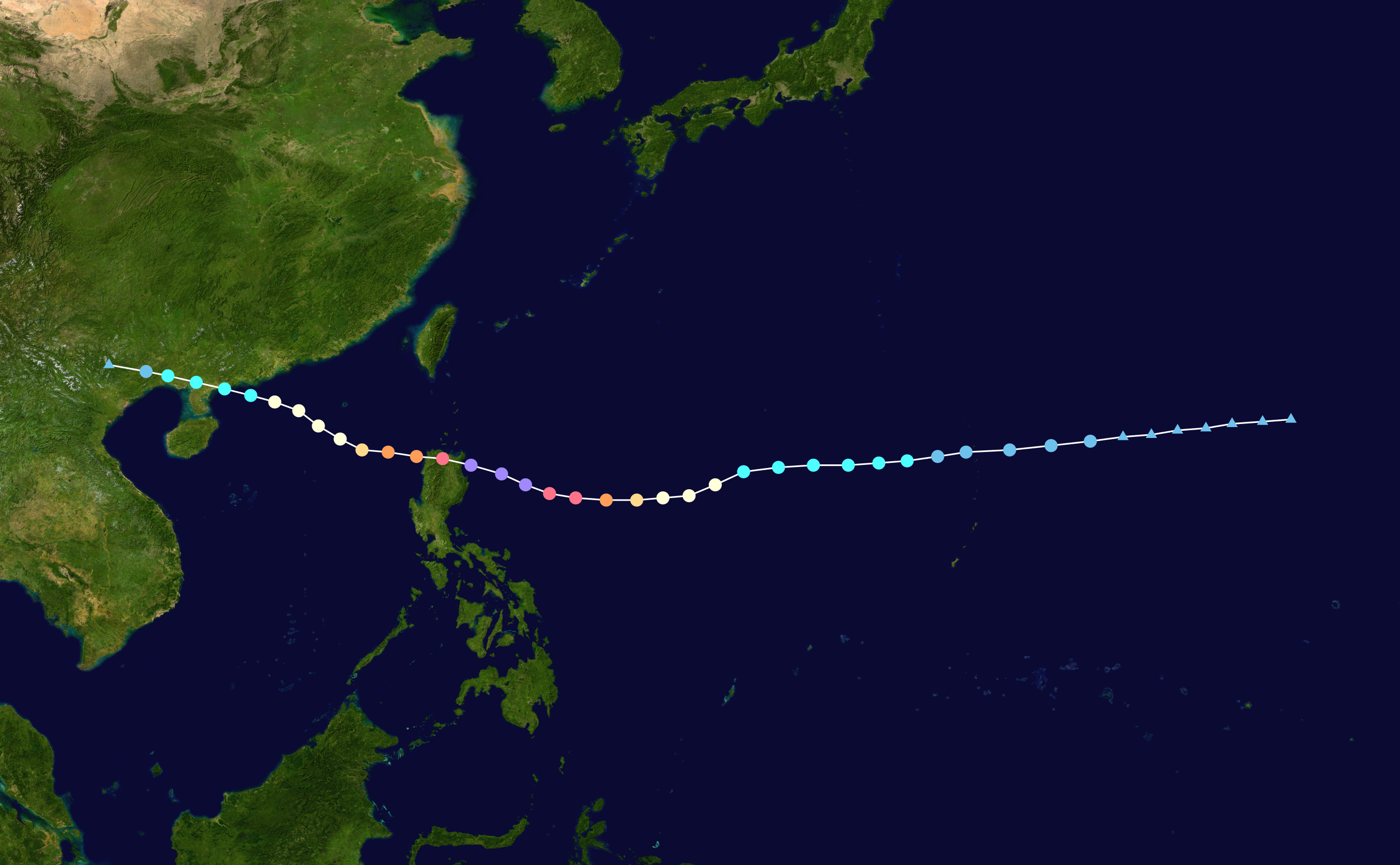
Map plotting the storm's track and intensity, according to the Saffir–Simpson scale Map key Saffir–Simpson scale Tropical depression (≤38 mph, ≤62 km/h) Tropical storm (39–73 mph, 63–118 km/h) Category 1 (74–95 mph, 119–153 km/h) Category 2 (96–110 mph, 154–177 km/h) Category 3 (111–129 mph, 178–208 km/h) Category 4 (130–156 mph, 209–251 km/h) Category 5 (≥157 mph, ≥252 km/h) Unknown Storm type Tropical cyclone Subtropical cyclone Extratropical cyclone, remnant low, tropical disturbance, or monsoon depression

In early July, widespread showers and thunderstorms developed across the Western Pacific underneath a tropical upper tropospheric trough (TUTT). On July 9, a single cumulonimbus cloud west of Wake Island became associated with the TUTT and quickly organized. By July 11, the system featured a small central dense overcast and soon became sufficiently organized for the Joint Typhoon Warning Center (JTWC) to declare it as Tropical Depression 11W. (Note: The Joint Typhoon Warning Center is a joint United States Navy – United States Air Force task force that issues tropical cyclone warnings for the western Pacific Ocean and other regions.) Upon classification, the system was located roughly 320 km (200 mi) east of the Northern Mariana Islands. The development of the depression was unprecedented in two ways: first, a single cloud developed into a tropical cyclone; and second, it became tropical while situated underneath a cold-core low.

Following the system's classification as a tropical cyclone, the depression maintained a west-southwesterly track in response to a subtropical ridge to the north. On July 12, it is estimated that the depression intensified into a tropical storm, at which time it was given the name Gordon by the JTWC. Due to the cyclone's proximity to the Philippines, the Philippine Atmospheric, Geophysical and Astronomical Services Administration also monitored the storm and assigned it with the local name Goring. During the afternoon of July 13, Gordon briefly turned southwestward as it attained typhoon status before returning to a more westerly track later that day.

As the TUTT gradually warmed, Gordon was able to undergo a prolonged period of rapid intensification, despite having restricted outflow. Over a 30-hour period from July 14 to 15, the storm's central pressure decreased by 70 mbar (hPa; 2.07 inHg), just below the threshold for explosive intensification. At the end of this phase, Gordon attained its peak strength as a Category 5 equivalent super typhoon with winds estimated at 260 km/h (160 mph). Around the same time, the Japan Meteorological Agency (JMA) assessed the storm to have attained 10-minute sustained winds of 185 km/h (115 mph) along with a minimum pressure of 915 mbar (hPa; 27.02 inHg). (Note: The Japan Meteorological Agency is the official Regional Specialized Meteorological Center for the western Pacific Ocean.)

Once classified a super typhoon, Gordon acquired a slight northerly component to its track and maintained a general west-northwestward trajectory for the remainder of its existence. Late on July 15, Gordon made landfall in northern Luzon, Philippines, at peak intensity. Remaining over land for several hours, the storm quickly weakened before entering the South China Sea. The system maintained minimal typhoon status as it developed a large, ragged eye by July 17. Slight weakening took place hours before Gordon made landfall as a strong tropical storm near Zhanjiang in Southern China on July 18. Briefly moving over the warm, shallow waters of the Gulf of Tonkin, Gordon's convective structure tripled in size; however, the system continued to weaken. Later that day, the storm made its final landfall in southern Guangxi Province. Once onshore, Gordon quickly weakened and was last noted on July 19 by the JMA over southern Guangxi.

== Preparations and impact ==
=== Philippines ===
Across Luzon, air traffic was temporarily suspended on July 16 until the typhoon's passage. Storm signal three, the highest level of warning, was issued for five provinces while lesser warnings were in place for most of the northern Philippines. The Philippine Coast Guard ordered all vessels in Luzon to remain at port until the storm's passage. Residents along the coast were urged to take "extreme precaution." All activities at the United States' Clark Air Base were canceled on July 16 while emergency rescue and cleanup teams were placed on standby. All non-essential personnel were ordered to remain home.

Striking northern Luzon on July 16, Typhoon Gordon packed sustained winds estimated at 260 km/h (160 mph), though the strongest reported winds reached 186 km/h (116 mph). At Wallace Air Station, wind gusts reached 126 km/h (78 mph). Torrential rains accompanying the storm, measured up to 747 mm (29.4 in) at Clark Air Base, caused widespread flooding and landslides. Across Cagayan Valley, flash flooding prompted thousands of residents to evacuate to higher ground. Travel in much of the region was severely impaired as landslides blocked off roads. Baguio was mostly isolated from surrounding areas as the main roads leading in and out of the city were blocked off. In Paoay, a bridge was washed out and high winds from the typhoon tore the roof off a public market. According to the Philippine Red Cross, nearly 11,000 people were in evacuation shelters by the evening of July 16 in Ilocos Norte. In La Union, three towns were submerged in flood waters up to rooftops of homes after a river burst its banks.

Throughout the country, 90 fatalities resulted from the typhoon. Additionally, 386 people were injured while another 3 were listed as missing. A total of 8,845 homes were destroyed and another 46,269 sustained damage. An estimated 120,000 people were left homeless due to Gordon. Losses from the typhoon amounted to 1.36 billion pesos (US$62 million). By July 18, relief operations began across northern Luzon. Philippine President Corazon Aquino declared a state of calamity for five provinces and three towns by this time.

=== Hong Kong, Taiwan, and Macao ===
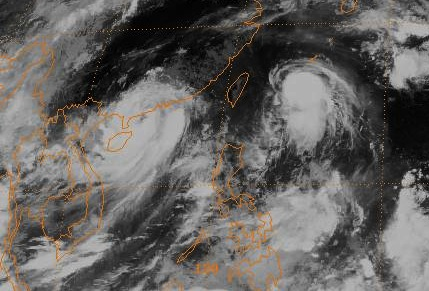
Infrared satellite image of Typhoon Gordon (left) and Tropical Storm Hope (right) on July 18. At the time of this image, Gordon was nearing landfall in southern China while Hope was maintaining a northwesterly course towards eastern China.

On July 15, the Central Weather Bureau issued a sea warning for the Bashi Channel and waters off the southeast coast of Taiwan. Residents were also warned of possible heavy, flooding rains and were urged to take precautions to minimize loss of life.

Regarded as the "fiercest typhoon to threaten Hong Kong in five years," the Hong Kong Observatory began issuing storm signals by July 16 to warn residents of the approaching storm. Early the next day, the signal was raised to three (strong wind signal) before being further increased to signal eight (gale warning) that afternoon. All ferries to and from Macao were halted and all schools were closed. Warnings urging residents to take steps to avoid unnecessary losses were continuously broadcast over radio stations. The normally busy Hong Kong was brought to a standstill as businesses, banks and courts closed for the storm. This included the Hong Kong Stock Exchange and the Chinese Gold and Silver Exchange. Public transport was mostly shut down and the government opened 78 shelters. Thousands of people were evacuated from low-lying areas along the coast. Approximately 11,000 Vietnamese boat people were also moved to emergency shelters.

Winds up to 192 km/h (119 mph) battered parts of Hong Kong, downing numerous trees, snapping power poles and blowing out windows. Driven by the intense winds, airborne debris injured 31, 6 of whom required hospitalization. Two fatalities took place in the territory: one on Lantau Island and another in Tai O. Some flooding took place as a result of Gordon, especially along coastal areas where the typhoon brought a storm surge of 1.36 m (4.5 ft).

In Macao, high winds from the typhoon uprooted trees and broke windows. Flooding triggered by Gordon's heavy rains stranded cars and inundated stores. Five of the colony's six casinoes were temporarily closed. Flooding also caused the Macau-Taipa bridge to collapse.

=== China ===
Striking Guangdong Province as a strong tropical storm, Gordon caused extensive damage in the region. Along the coast, approximately 155 km (96 mi) of dykes were destroyed by storm surge. Already suffering from extensive floods, heavy rains and record tides from Typhoon Gordon caused "massive" flooding in Zhuhai, Guangdong. Flood waters over-topped dams and sea walls and inundated the city. Approximately 11,000 people were forced to seek refuge on the roof of their homes. One of the hardest hit cities was Yangjiang where flood waters caused widespread damage. Roughly 46,000 homes were damaged or destroyed in the city while 252 km (157 mi) of highway and 26 bridges were washed away. Telecommunications in Guangzhou, the capital of Guangdong, was completely lost due to the storm and parts of the city were isolated due to flooding. Across the province, an estimated 140,000 hectares (350,000 acres) of farmland was flooded. High winds in Yangchun caused several structures to collapse. Flooding also caused extensive damage to infrastructure with 22 bridges destroyed and 225 km (140 mi) of roads under water. Offshore in the South China Sea, 24 fishermen were caught in the storm and became stranded. The crew drifted in the sea for 24 days, during which time 14 perished, before the survivors were rescued. Heavy rains also fell in parts of Guangxi Province; however, the rains were mostly beneficial to farmers. Throughout southern China, at least 200 people were killed by the typhoon and damage amounted to 1.2 billion yuan (US$319 million).

== See also ==
- 1989 Pacific typhoon season
- Other tropical cyclones named Gordon
- Typhoon Angela (1989)
- Typhoon Brian (1989)
- Typhoon Dot (1989)
- Typhoon Dan (1989)
- Typhoon Elsie (1989)
- Typhoon Mangkhut (2018) – A storm with a similar track.
