= Siesta Key, Florida =

Siesta Key, Florida Little Sarasota Key, Sarasota Key
- Census-designated place
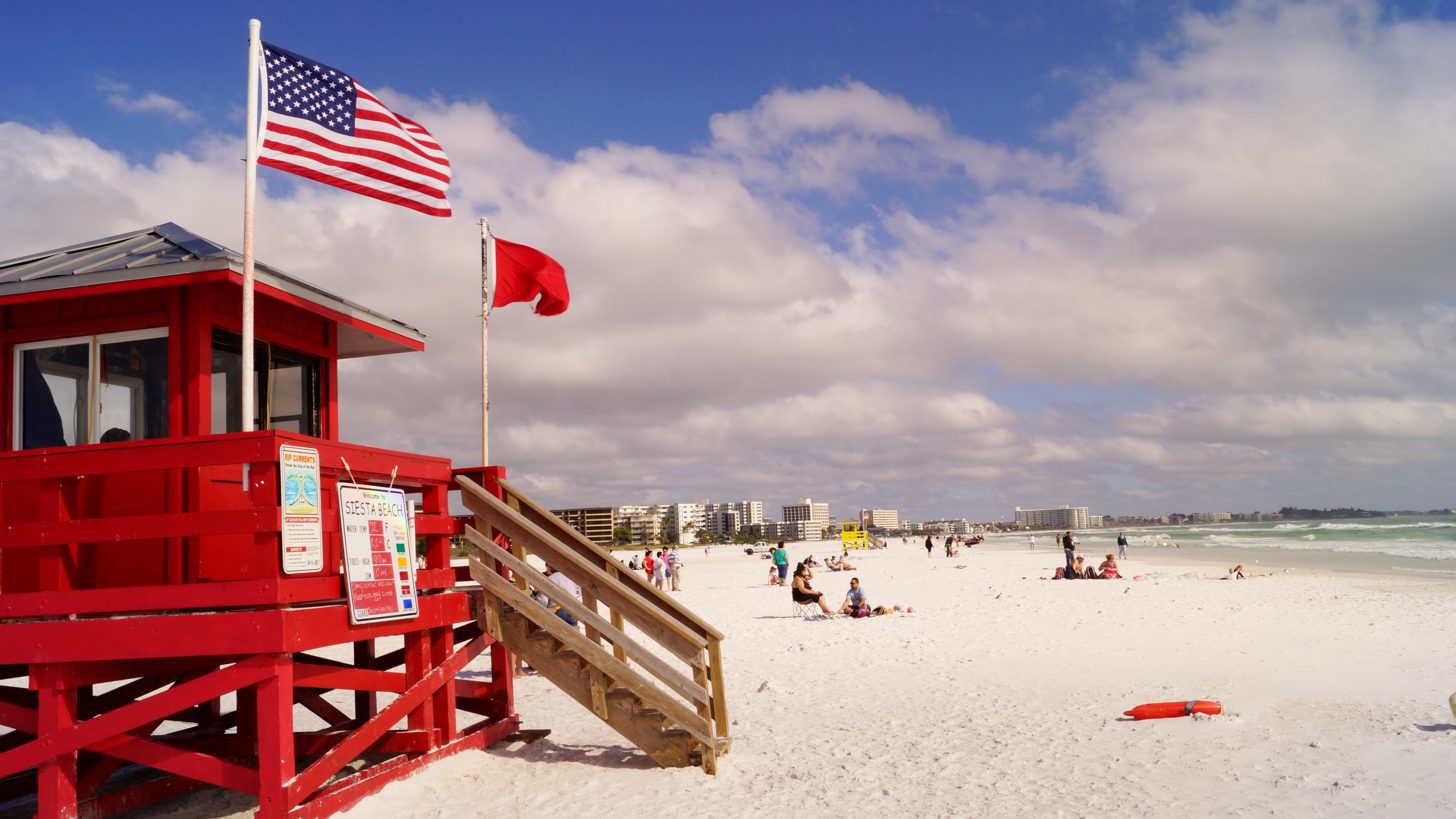
- Lifeguard stand at Siesta Key Beach

- Location in Sarasota County and the state of Florida
- Coordinates: 27°16′41″N 82°33′06″W
- Country: United States
- State: Florida
- County: Sarasota

Area
  - Total: 3.46 sq mi (8.97 km^{2})
  - Land: 2.34 sq mi (6.07 km^{2})
  - Water: 1.12 sq mi (2.90 km^{2})
- Elevation: 7 ft (2.1 m)

Population (2020)
  - Total: 5,454
  - Density: 2,326.4/sq mi (898.23/km^{2})
- Time zone: UTC−05:00 (EST)
  - Summer (DST): UTC−04:00 (EDT)
- ZIP Code: 34242
- Area code: 941
- FIPS code: 12-66000
- GNIS feature ID: 2402852

Siesta Key is a barrier island off the southwest coast of the U.S. state of Florida, located between Roberts Bay and the Gulf of Mexico. A portion of it lies within the city boundary of Sarasota, but the majority of the key is a census-designated place (CDP) in Sarasota County. Siesta Key is part of the North Port–Bradenton–Sarasota, Florida Metropolitan Statistical Area.

As of the 2020 census, Siesta Key had a population of 5,454.

== History ==
From the 19th century to the early 20th century, Siesta Key was known by a variety of names, including Little Sarasota Key and Sarasota Key. The first attempts to develop the key were by the Siesta Land Company in 1907, consisting of Harry Higel, Captain Louis Roberts, and E. M. Arbogast. The company platted the northern end of the key as Siesta on the Gulf of Mexico as well as dredged bayous and built docks.

Access to Siesta Key was by boat or ferry until the first bridge connecting it to the mainland was completed in 1917. The bridge was replaced in 1927 with the addition of a second bridge located on the southern end of the key. The entire key officially was recognized as Siesta Key by 1952.

On October 9, 2024, Hurricane Milton made landfall as a Category 3 hurricane near Siesta Key.

== Geography ==
According to the United States Census Bureau, the CDP has a total area of 3.5 square miles (9.0 km^{2}), of which 2.4 square miles (6.1 km^{2}) is land and 1.1 square miles (2.9 km^{2}), or 32.08%, is water.

Siesta Key is made up of four main districts: Siesta Beach, Crescent Beach, Turtle Beach, and Siesta Key Village. It contains a suburban residential area located on the Siesta Key barrier island on the West coast of Florida, just west of the town of Sarasota. The community on Siesta Key consists of single-family homes, condominiums, retail shops, and art galleries.

=== Beaches ===
Beaches on Siesta Key include Siesta Beach, Crescent Beach, and Turtle Beach.

== Demographics ==
Historical population
Census	Pop.	Note	%±
1970	4,460		—
1980	7,010		57.2%
1990	7,772		10.9%
2000	7,150		−8.0%
2010	6,565		−8.2%
2020	5,454		−16.9%

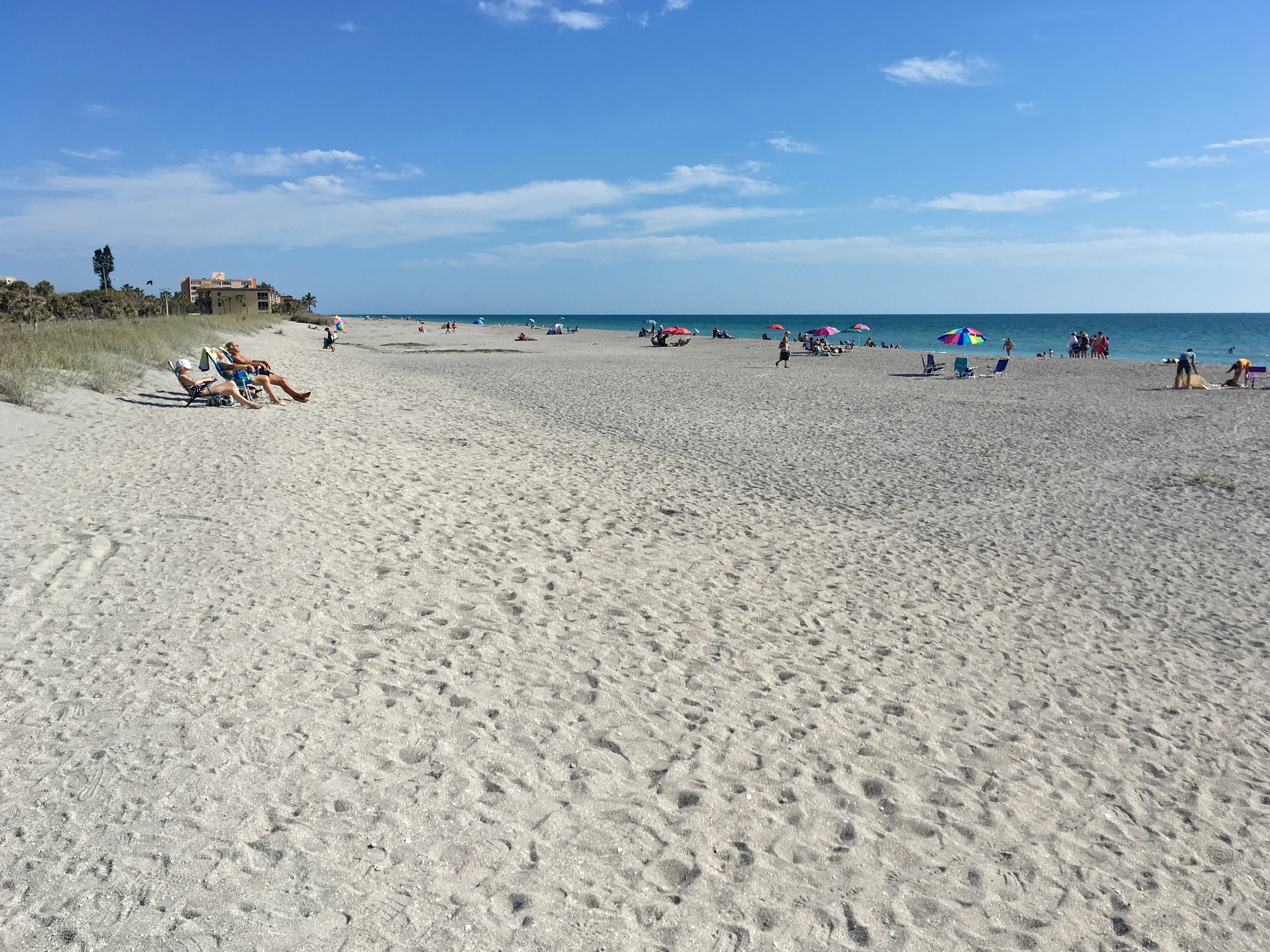
The sand of Turtle Beach

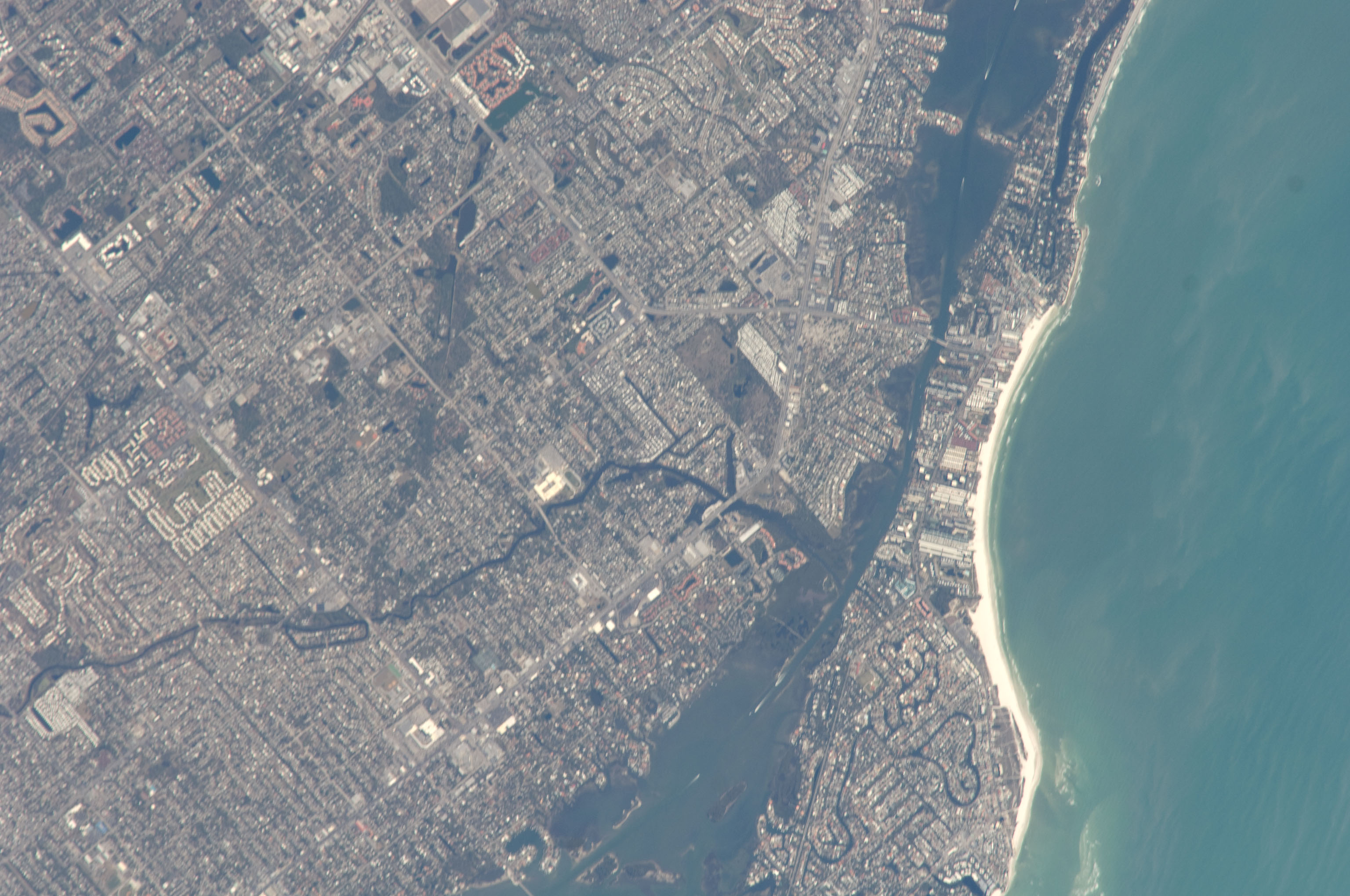
Aerial view of parts of Phillippi Creek connecting to Robert Bay and the intercoastal waterway by Siesta Key taken from ISS Expedition 18

=== 2020 census ===
As of the 2020 census, Siesta Key had a population of 5,454. The median age was 64.6 years. 7.4% of residents were under the age of 18 and 49.0% of residents were 65 years of age or older. For every 100 females there were 93.5 males, and for every 100 females age 18 and over there were 91.4 males age 18 and over.

100.0% of residents lived in urban areas, while 0.0% lived in rural areas.

There were 2,814 households in Siesta Key, of which 10.8% had children under the age of 18 living in them. Of all households, 56.6% were married-couple households, 15.7% were households with a male householder and no spouse or partner present, and 23.7% were households with a female householder and no spouse or partner present. About 32.2% of all households were made up of individuals and 21.6% had someone living alone who was 65 years of age or older.

There were 7,792 housing units, of which 63.9% were vacant. The homeowner vacancy rate was 3.5% and the rental vacancy rate was 79.8%.

Racial composition as of the 2020 census
Race	Number	Percent
White	5,074	93.0%
Black or African American	12	0.2%
American Indian and Alaska Native	6	0.1%
Asian	78	1.4%
Native Hawaiian and Other Pacific Islander	2	0.0%
Some other race	51	0.9%
Two or more races	231	4.2%
Hispanic or Latino (of any race)	157	2.9%

=== Demographic estimates ===
As of 2022, 1.0% of the population was under 5 years old and 51.2% were female persons. 11.8% of the population were foreign-born persons, and there were 483 veterans living in the CDP.

=== Income and poverty ===
The median household income was $108,527. 3.3% of the population lived below the poverty threshold. 98.7% of households had a computer, and 91.3% of households had a broadband internet subscription.

== Notable people ==
- Frederick Fennell (1914-2004), noted band conductor and musical educator.
- John D. MacDonald (1916-1986), author of the Travis McGee series and other works of mid-20th-century fiction
