= Turtle Beach (Florida) =

Public beach in Sarasota, Florida

- Beach
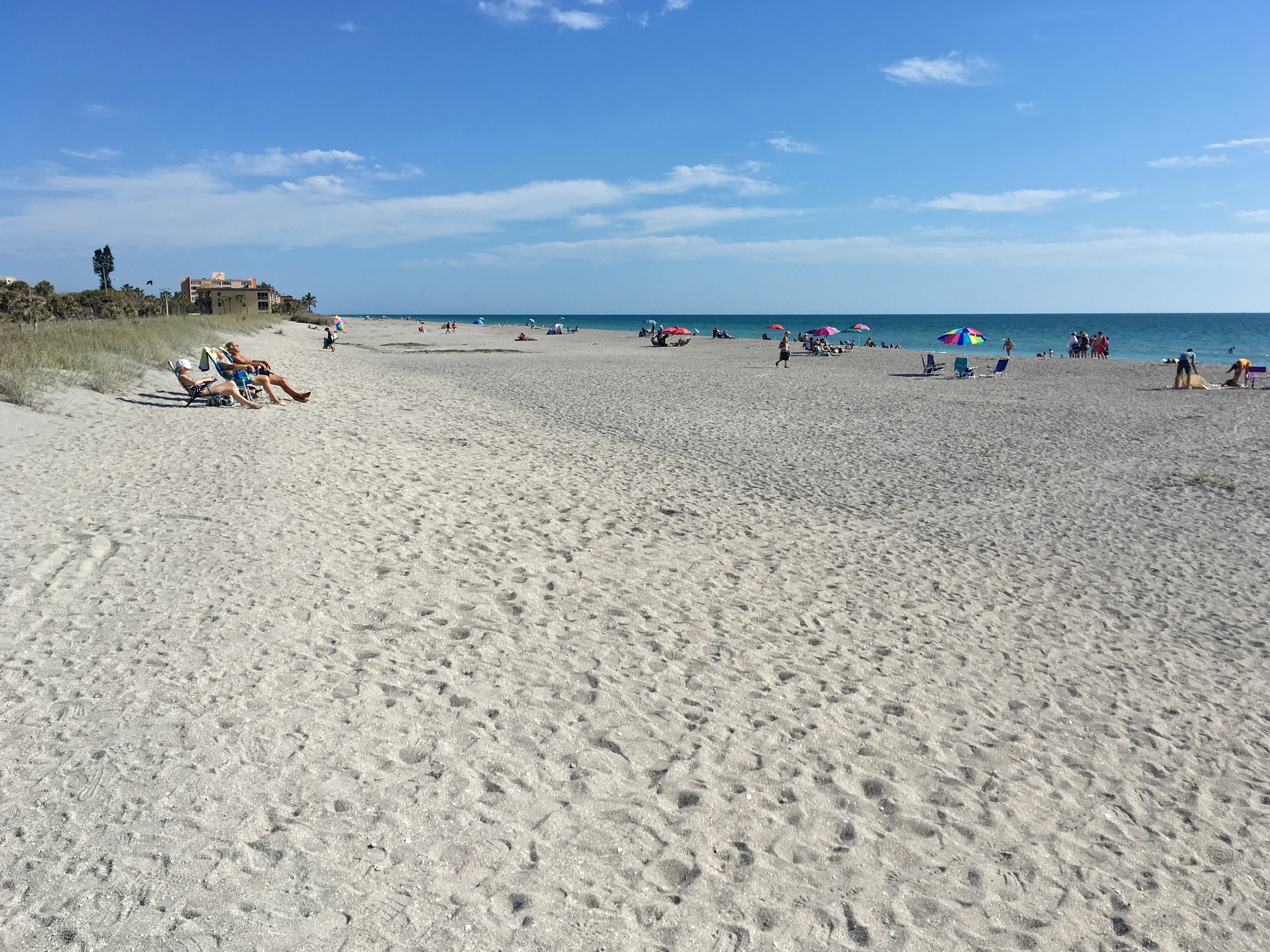
- Turtle Beach

- Coordinates: 27°13′05″N 82°31′02″W
- Location: Siesta Key, Sarasota, Florida

Dimensions
  - Length: 2,600 feet (790 m)

Turtle Beach is a public beach located on South Siesta Key in Sarasota, Florida. Turtle Beach is known for the large number of sea turtles that nest on the shore. It has roughly 1,200 feet of beachfront that is accessible to the public as well as camping, picnic areas, and a children's play area. There are two boat ramps to launch boats on the lagoon side of the property. The beach has had major problems with erosion. Sharks have been present in the ocean near the beach.

Rows of condominiums exist on private property near the beach.

== Camping ==
Turtle Beach Campground sits next to the public park and has access to Turtle Beach. The property has 41 campsites and is open to guests year-round. Fires and pets are not allowed at these grounds.
