= Effects of the 2020 North Indian Ocean cyclone season in India =

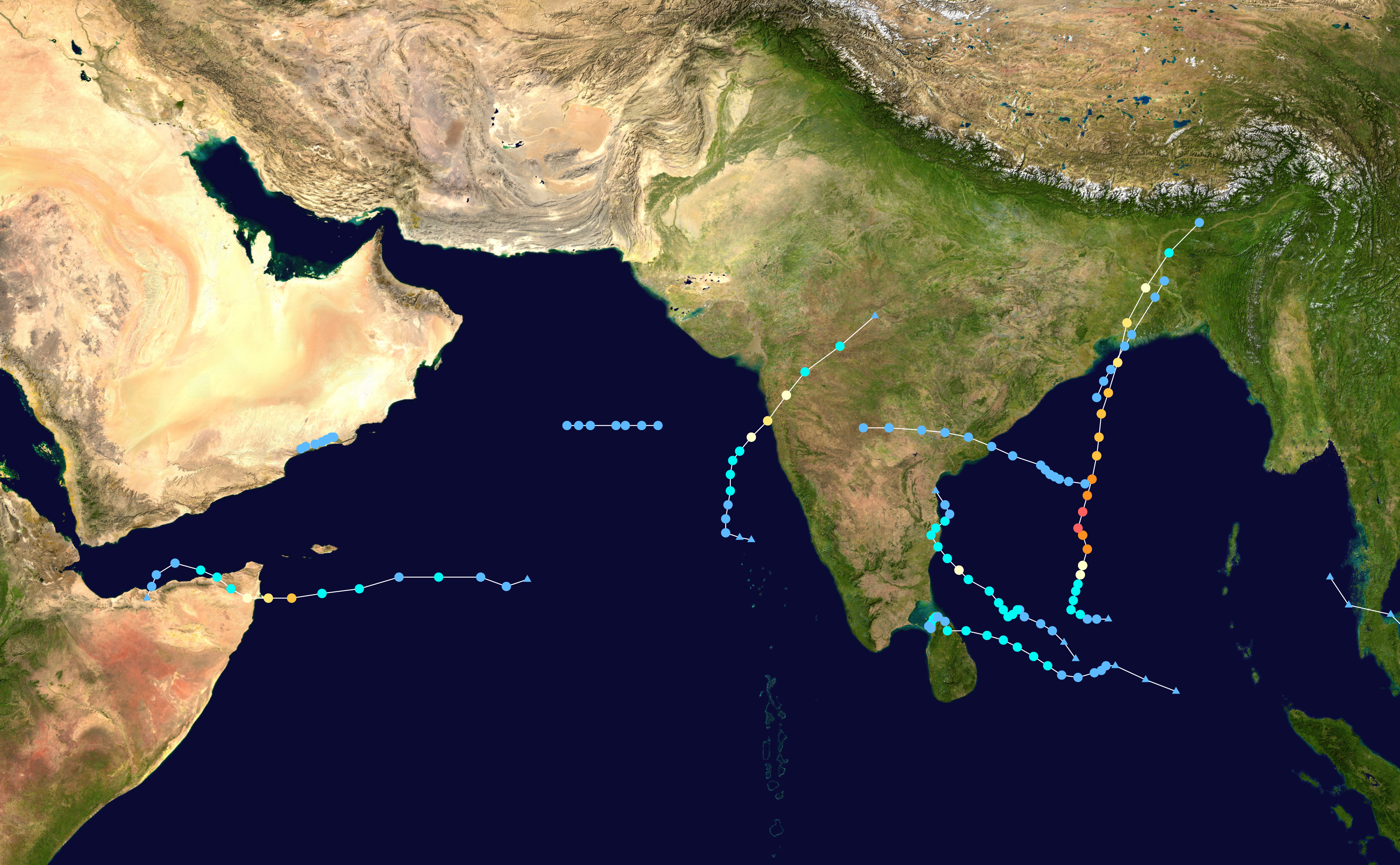
Tracks of all storms during the 2020 season

The 2020 North Indian Ocean cyclone season in India was considered one of the worst in decades, largely due to Super Cyclonic Storm Amphan. Throughout most of the year, a series of cyclones impacted the country, with the worst damage occurring in May, from Cyclone Amphan. The season started with Super Cyclonic Storm Amphan, which affected East India with very severe damages. 98 total people died from the storm. Approximately 1,167 km (725 mi) of power lines of varying voltages, 126,540 transformers, and 448 electrical substations were affected, leaving 3.4 million without power. Damage to the power grid reached ₹3.2 billion (US$42 million). Four people died in Odisha, two from collapsed objects, one due to drowning, and one from head trauma. Across the ten affected districts in Odisha, 4.4 million people were impacted in some way by the cyclone. At least 500 homes were destroyed and a further 15,000 were damaged. Nearly 4,000 livestock, primarily poultry, died. The cyclone was strongest at its northeast section. The next storm was a depression that did not affect India. Then Severe Cyclonic Storm Nisarga hit Maharashtra, with high damages. Nisarga caused 6 deaths and 16 injuries in the state. Over 5,033 ha (12,435 acres) of land were damaged.

Then three depressions, BOB 02, BOB 03, and ARB 03, brought heavy rains to India. Soon after, Cyclone Nivar brought high winds and heavy rain to South India, and it costed $600 million (2020 USD). Cyclone Burevi only brushed Kerala and Tamil Nadu, only bringing rain. Flooding occurred in Tamil Nadu and Puducherry, inundating the Chidambaram Nataraja Temple. Crop damage also occurred in the area. However, the state of Kerala was spared from the worst of the storm. Burevi left 11 people dead with 5 others missing as of December 6, 2020. Burevi was the last storm of the season.

== Seasonal Statistics ==
Name	Dates of impact	Fatalities	Damages (Millions US$)	Maximum intensity during passage
Cyclone Amphan	May 20–21, 2020	98	$13.5 billion	169 kilometres per hour (105 mph)
Cyclone Nisarga	June 3–4, 2020	6	$803 million	110 kilometres per hour (68 mph)
Depression BOB 02 (Note: BOB 02's remnants continued over India to become ARB 03.)	October 13–17, 2020	98	$681 million	55–65 km/h (34–40 mph)
Depression BOB 03	October 23, 2020	None	Minimal	35 mph (56 km/h)
Cyclone Nivar	November 25–27, 2020	14	$600 million	56 kilometres per hour (35 mph)
Cyclone Burevi	December 4–5, 2020	9	N/A	72 kilometres per hour (45 mph)

== Seasonal Activity ==
=== May ===
==== Cyclone Amphan ====
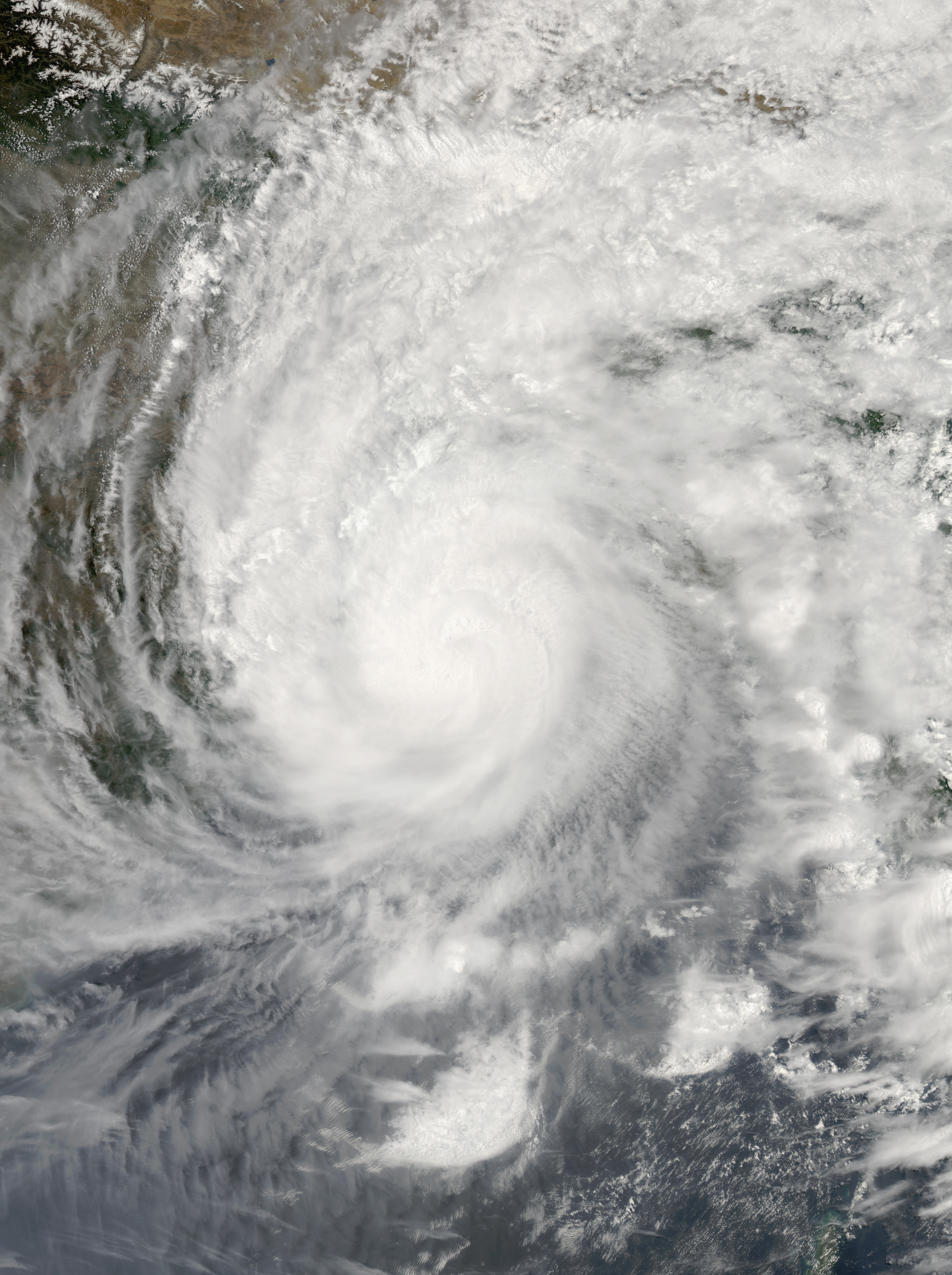
Satellite image of Amphan making landfall on West Bengal on 20 May

The only storm of the month, Amphan caused lots of damage to standing crops, thousands of trees were uprooted, and power and water supply was interrupted in the state capital Kolkata. At least 86 people died in West Bengal; most of the fatalities were due to electrocution or the collapse of homes. The state government estimated that the storm caused at least ₹1.02 trillion (US$13.5 billion) in damage and directly affected 70 percent of the state's population. An estimated storm surge of 5 m (16 ft) inundated a wide swath of coastal communities and communications were severed. The greatest inundations were expected in the Sundarbans, where flooding could extend 15 km (9.3 mi) inland. Embankments in the region were overtaken by the surge, leading to inundation of the islands in the Sundarbans. Bridges linking islands to the Indian mainland were swept away. The cyclone produced sustained winds of 112 km/h (70 mph) and gusts to 190 km/h (120 mph), which were recorded by the Alipore observatory, Kolkata, West Bengal, damaging homes and uprooting trees and electric poles. Wind speed along coastal areas were measured up to 150–160 km/h (93–99 mph). In Canning a wind speed of 157 km/h (98 mph) with gusting up to 185 km/h (115 mph) was recorded, while nearby Nimpith and Sagar Island observed 155 km/h (96 mph) and 111 km/h (69 mph) wind speed. The Netaji Subhas Chandra Bose International Airport recorded wind speeds up to 133 km/h (83 mph) .This overturned vehicles and snapped approximately 10,000 trees. The Calcutta Municipal Corporation stated that Amphan toppled over 4,000 electric poles, leaving much of the city without power for over 14 hours.

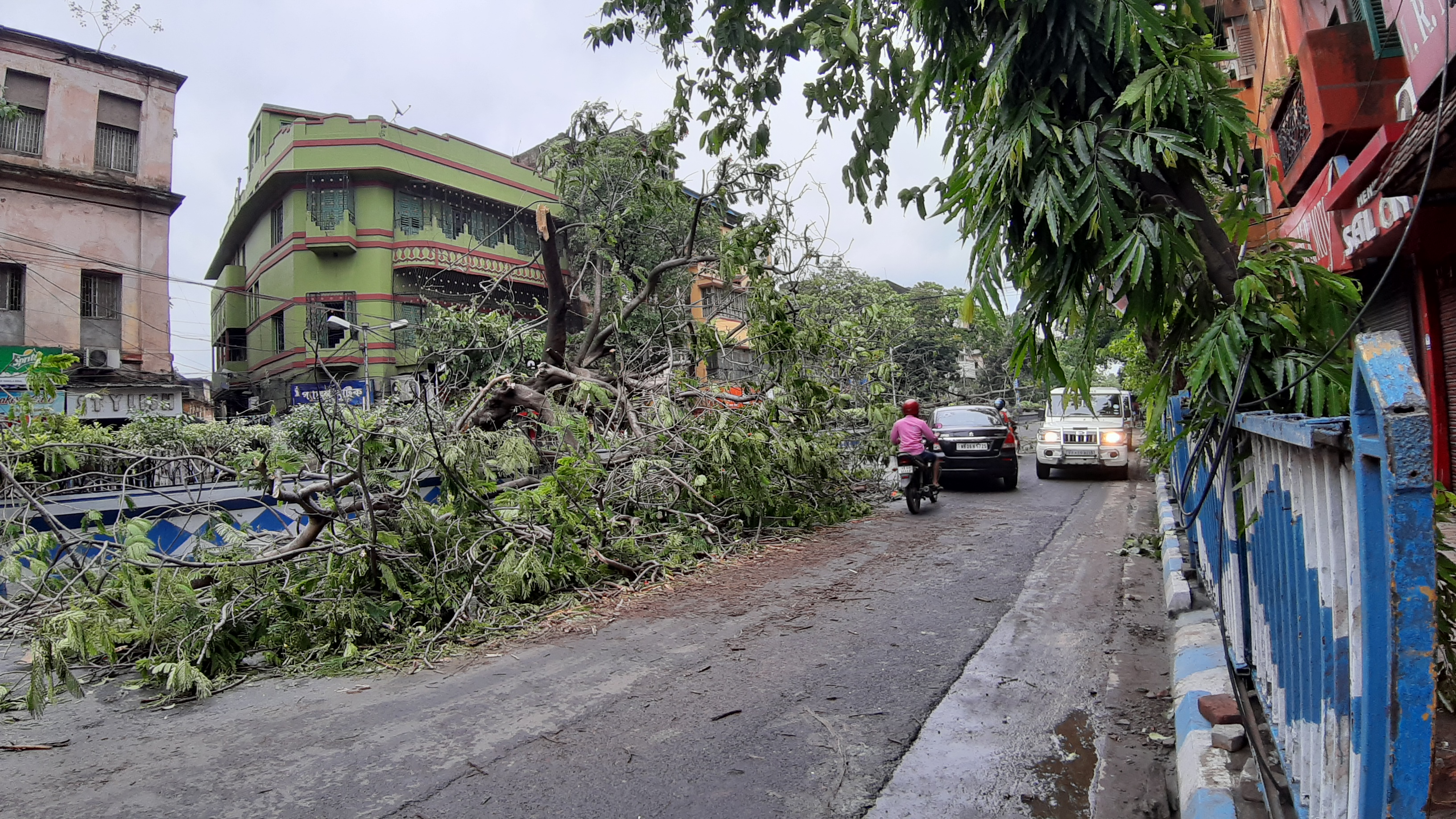
Damage from Cyclone Amphan in Kolkata

At least 19 people were killed in Kolkata. The storm also triggered widespread flooding around the city. 236 mm of rain was recorded in Kolkata. Many in the state have lost their entire homes as well. Also, electricity and telephone lines brought down and houses flattened. Lots of roads were flooded and 14 million were without power. In North 24 Parganas, 2 people were killed and up to 5,500 homes were damaged. Thousands of mud homes were damaged in the neighboring Hooghly district. A million homes were damaged in South 24 Parganas and breached embankments led to the flooding of villages and swaths of cropland. About 26,000 homes were destroyed in Gosaba. Saltwater inundation affected surrounding areas following damage to 19 km (12 mi) of nearby embankments. Around 150 km from the area in Nadia, the storm caused severe damage. Across West Bengal, 88,000 hectares (217,000 acres) of rice paddies and 200,000 hectares (500,000 acres) of vegetable and sesame crops were damaged. 17 people died in the West Bengal State, and 98 total in India. Amphan was the worst in 283 years.

=== June ===
==== Cyclone Nisarga ====
Nisarga caused 6 deaths and 16 injuries in Maharashtra. Over 5,033 ha (12,440 acres) of land were damaged. The Government of Maharashtra put the total damage from Nisarga at Rs.60.48 billion (US$803 million), and the state required Rs11 billion (US$146 million) to recover from the damage caused by Nisarga. In total, Nisarga killed 6 and caused $803 million in damage.

=== October ===
October had three depressions: BOB 02, ARB 03, and BOB 03.

==== BOB 02 and ARB 03 ====
Due to BOB 02, Puducherry, Andhra Pradesh, Telangana, Kerala, Maharashtra, and coastal Karnataka experienced heavy rain on 12 and 13 October with the capital city, with Hyderabad experiencing 32 cm of record breaking torrential rain creating flash floods on the city by 13 October. 2 people died in Vijayawada, and 50 people died on different parts of Telangana, including 19 in Hyderabad. Additionally, twenty seven people died in Maharashtra. Extreme crop loss in north Karnataka, Andhra Pradesh and Telangana occurred due to the system. The Chief Minister of Telangana estimated ₹5,000 crore (US$681 million) worth of damage. On 18 October, a second cyclone killed two more people in Hyderabad. Over 37,000 families were affected by the second flood. Rainfall reached over 110 mm (4.3 in) in parts of Hyderabad, with heavier rainfall amounts outside of the city. With over 80 people having lost their lives and about 40,000 families being displaced, post rain gathering up-to 20,000 tons of waste. The remnants then reintensified into Depression ARB 03.

BOB 03 brought high winds and some rain to West Bengal, a state still reeling from Amphan. There were no deaths during the storm and minimal damage occurred with heavy rainfall.

=== November ===
The month of November contribute with Cyclone Nivar which cause significant damage in Tamil Nadu and Andhra Pradesh.

==== Cyclone Nivar ====
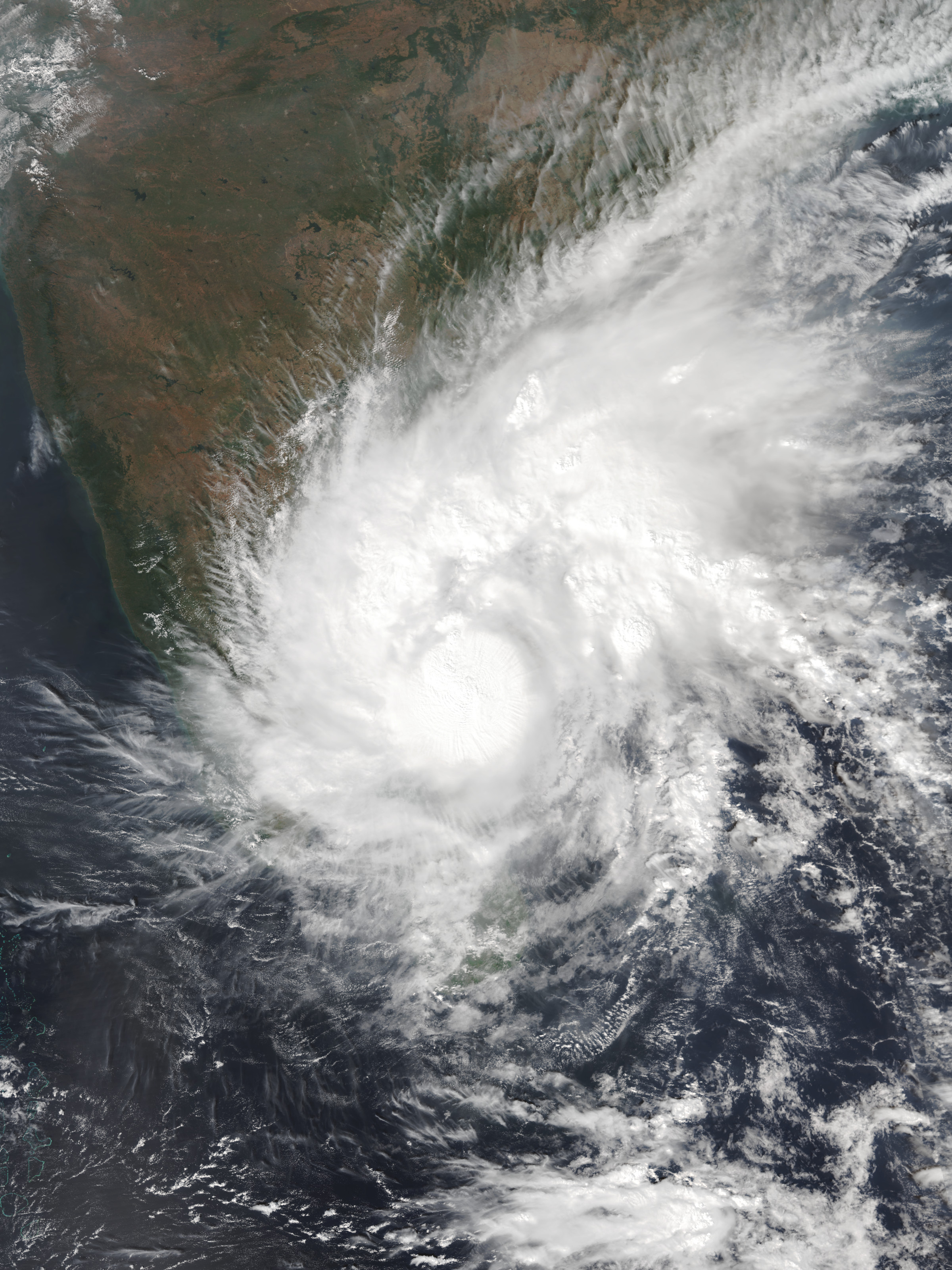
Nivar at peak intensity

The Cyclone brought heavy to very heavy rains over North coastal Tamil Nadu starting 23 November 2020. Chennai received continuous downpours between 23 November and 25 November 2020 with RMC Chennai recording 163 mm (6.4 in) ending 25 November 8:30 AM IST. Chennai and other parts of North Tamil Nadu, saw gusty winds touching up to 60–70 km/h (35–45 mph) from 24 November to 25 November 2020. Several roads were closed in the area of the Greater Chennai Corporation were closed due to waterlogging. Due to intense rainfall, Chembarambakkam lake have released water for the first time after five years. Many areas including Madipakkam, Velachery, Adambakkam and suburbs around Tambaram and low-lying regions along the river Adyar were flooded. Rainwater entering houses was also seen in some places in the western suburbs. The Greater Chennai Corporation removed uprooted trees from 223 roads. The estimates of Chennai civic officials reported that flood water entered around 40,000 homes within the borders of the corporation. Five people were reported dead in Tamil Nadu.

In Puducherry, trees were uprooted, electric poles were damaged and several areas were flooded as of November 26. The Chief Minister of Puducherry V. Narayanasamy reported that the initial loss in agriculture and other sectors was estimated at ₹4 billion (US$54.2 million).

The remnants of Cyclone Nivar caused eight people were reported dead in Andhra Pradesh. The rainfalls made significant impact on the districts of Chittoor, Prakasam, Kadapa and Nellore, 112,000 people were affected, 2,294 houses/huts were damaged, 6,133 homes were left stranded, 2,618 small animals, 88 large animals and 8,130 poultry birds were reported dead based on a preliminary evaluation. In Nellore district, Paddy seedlings in 2,500 ha (6,200 acres) drowned and in Prakasam district, standing crops in 34,000 hectares were damaged.

=== December ===
Burevi was the last storm of the season, and it brought heavy rain and torrential flooding to Southern India.

==== Cyclone Burevi ====
Burevi dropping torrential rainfall over southern India from December 4–5

Burevi caused minimal impacts to India, but Tamil Nadu was not completely spared. In Tamil Nadu, 9 people were killed due to Burevi. The Wellington Dam's water level reached above the highest flood stage. Flooding isolated many villages from the capital, Chennai. The Chidambaram Nataraja Temple in the district of Cuddalore was flooded after receiving 340 mm (13.386 in) of precipitation. In Barathampattam, agricultural land was flooded, causing crop damage.

In Puducherry, precipitation amounts of 138 mm (5.433 in) were recorded as of December 4, 2020. In Pondicherry, the power supply of the city was briefly cut off on December 3. In the area, damage to trees, crops, and huts was reported. Although Burevi brought torrential rainfall to Kerala, the worst of the cyclone missed the state.

== Aftermath ==
The 2020 North Indian Ocean cyclone season was the costliest North Indian Ocean cyclone season in recorded history. The season cost more than $15.78 billion (2020 USD), and a total of 128 people were killed.

== See also ==
- Tropical cyclones in India
- 2020 North Indian Ocean cyclone season
