= 2020 North Indian Ocean cyclone season =

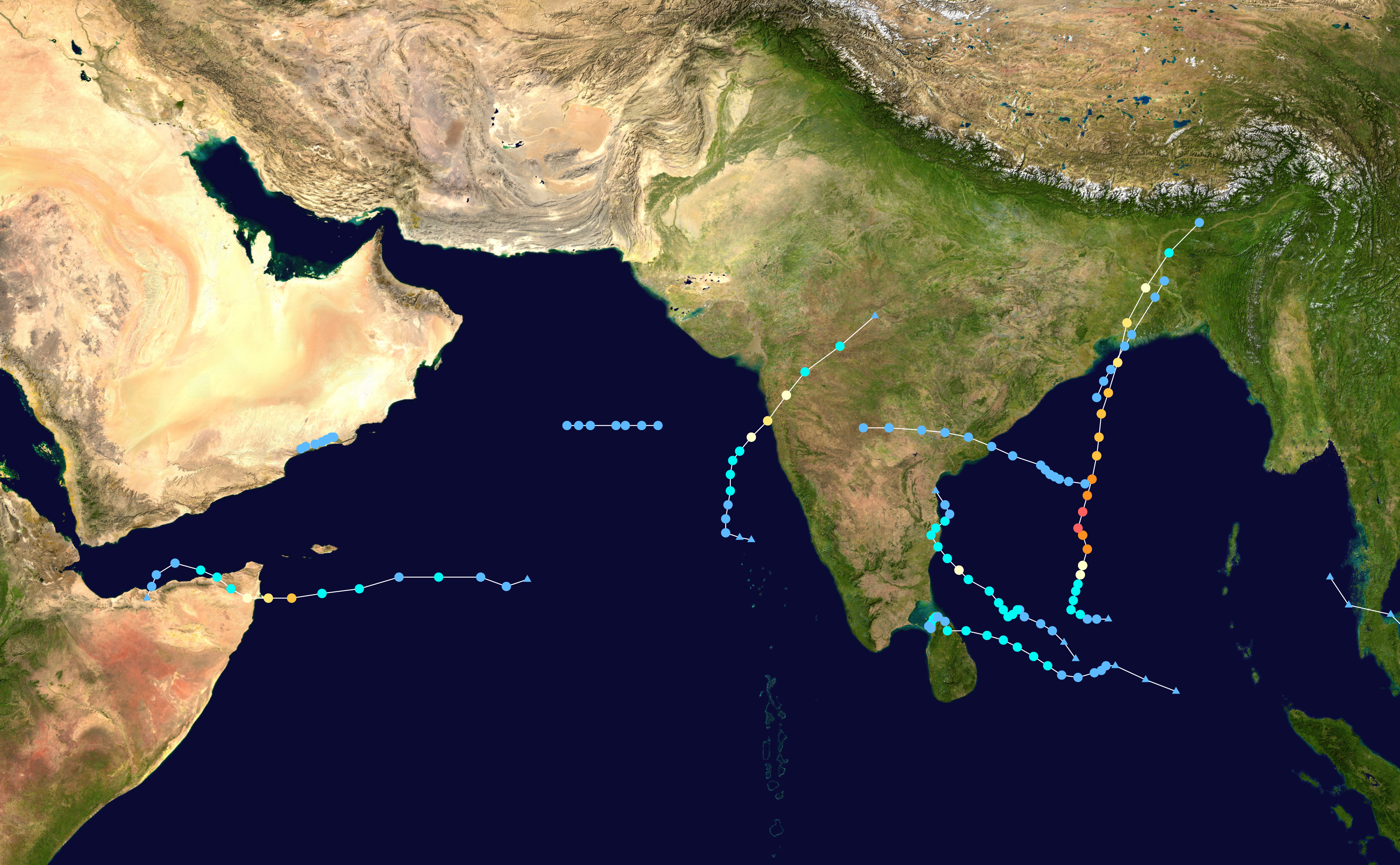
- Season summary map

Seasonal boundaries
- First system formed: May 16, 2020
- Last system dissipated: December 5, 2020

Strongest storm
- Name: Amphan
  - Maximum winds: 240 km/h (150 mph) (3-minute sustained)
  - Lowest pressure: 920 hPa (mbar)

Seasonal statistics
- Depressions: 9
- Deep depressions: 6
- Cyclonic storms: 5
- Severe cyclonic storms: 4
- Very severe cyclonic storms: 3
- Extremely severe cyclonic storms: 1
- Super cyclonic storms: 1
- Total fatalities: 280 total
- Total damage: > $18.14 billion (2020 USD) (Second-costliest North Indian Ocean cyclone season on record)

Related articles
- Effects of the 2020 North Indian Ocean cyclone season in India; 2020 Atlantic hurricane season; 2020 Pacific hurricane season; 2020 Pacific typhoon season

The 2020 North Indian Ocean cyclone season was at that time, the costliest North Indian Ocean cyclone season on record, until it was surpassed 5 years later, mostly due to the devastating Cyclone Amphan. It was an above average season featuring 5 cyclonic storms. The North Indian Ocean cyclone season has no official bounds, but cyclones tend to form between April and November, with peaks in late April to May and October to November. These dates conventionally delimit the period of each year when most tropical cyclones form in the northern Indian Ocean. In 2020, the cyclone season began on May 16 with the designation of Depression BOB 01 in the Bay of Bengal, which later became Amphan. Cyclone Amphan was the strongest storm in the Bay of Bengal in 21 years and broke Nargis of 2008's record as the costliest storm in the North Indian Ocean. The season concluded with the dissipation of Cyclone Burevi on December 5. Overall, the season was slightly above average, seeing the development of five cyclonic storms.

The scope of the season is limited to the Indian Ocean in the Northern Hemisphere, east of the Horn of Africa and west of the Malay Peninsula. There are two main seas in the North Indian Ocean – the Arabian Sea to the west of the Indian subcontinent, abbreviated ARB by the India Meteorological Department (IMD); and the Bay of Bengal to the east, abbreviated BOB by the IMD.

The official Regional Specialized Meteorological Centre in the basin is the India Meteorological Department (IMD), while the United States's Joint Typhoon Warning Center (JTWC) releases unofficial advisories. On average, three to four cyclonic storms form in this basin every season.

== Season summary ==
The season began on May 16 with the designation of Depression BOB 01 in the Bay of Bengal, which later became Cyclone Amphan, the strongest storm in the Bay of Bengal recorded since the 1999 Odisha cyclone and breaking the record of Cyclone Nargis of 2008 as the costliest storm ever recorded in the basin. Two more cyclones formed in the Arabian Sea, ARB 01, affecting Yemen and Oman, and Cyclone Nisarga, which made landfall in Maharashtra. After a four-month pause of activity, BOB 02 formed, causing 98 fatalities. Its remnants formed ARB 03. It was a weak storm. After 2 days, BOB 03 formed, impacting and affecting West Bengal, Bangladesh and Northeast India. It was also a weak storm, lasting for 2 days. After its break, Cyclone Gati formed, leaving 8 confirmed, 30 missing as of today, on Somalia and Yemen, where the cyclone took place. On November 23, a depression formed in the Bay of Bengal, and it strengthened into Very Severe Cyclonic Storm Nivar, two days later. It made landfall between Puducherry and Chennai close to Mahabalipuram in the midnight of November 25. It weakened into a well marked low pressure in the early hours of November 27. On November 28, a low pressure formed off the coast of Tamil Nadu, it gradually intensified into a depression, BOB 05. It later intensified into a deep depression and then into a cyclonic storm, named Cyclone Burevi. It made landfall on Sri Lanka as a weak cyclonic storm before it degenerated to an area of low pressure.

== Systems ==
=== Super Cyclonic Storm Amphan ===
- Super cyclonic storm (IMD)
- Category 5 tropical cyclone (SSHWS)
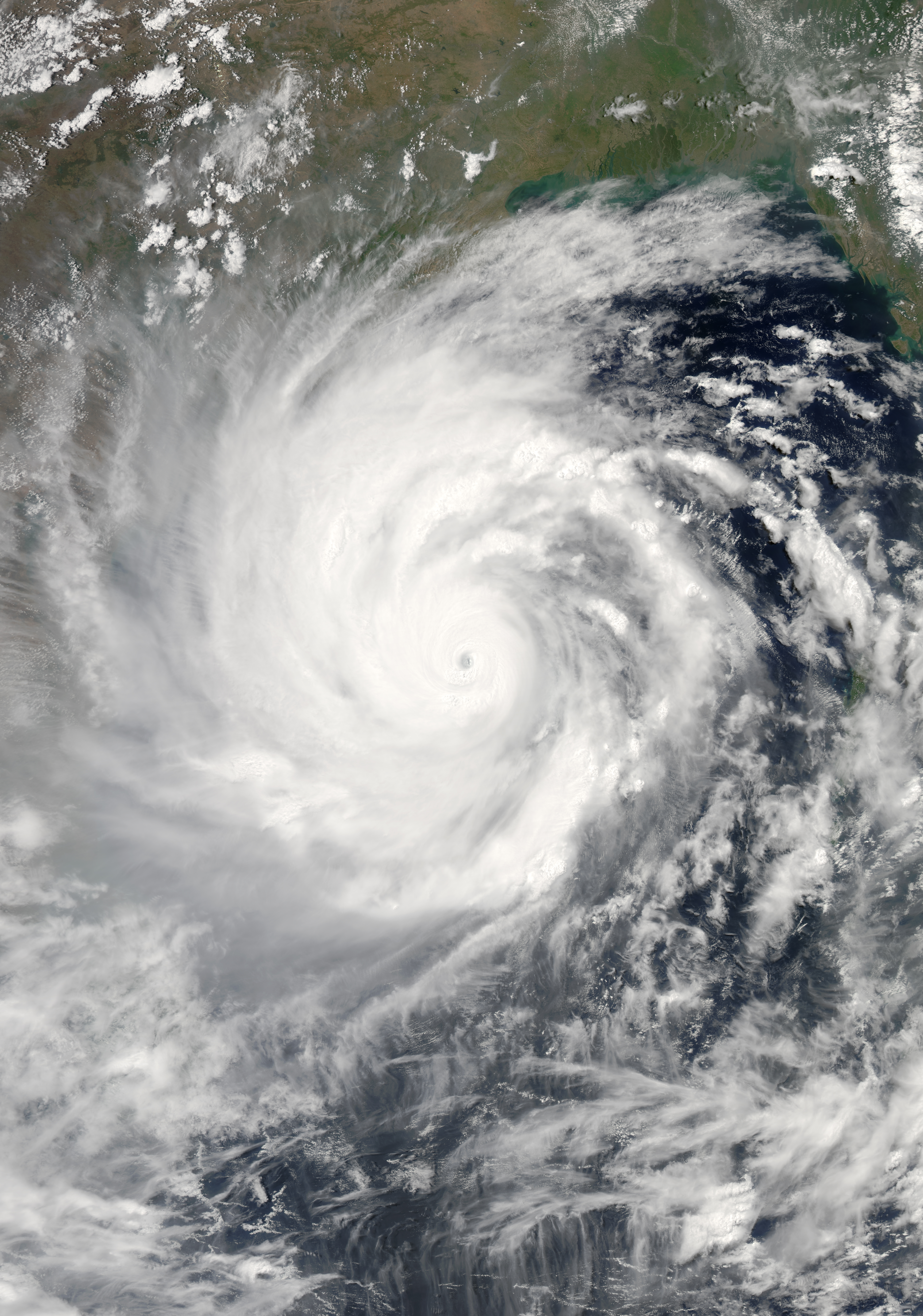
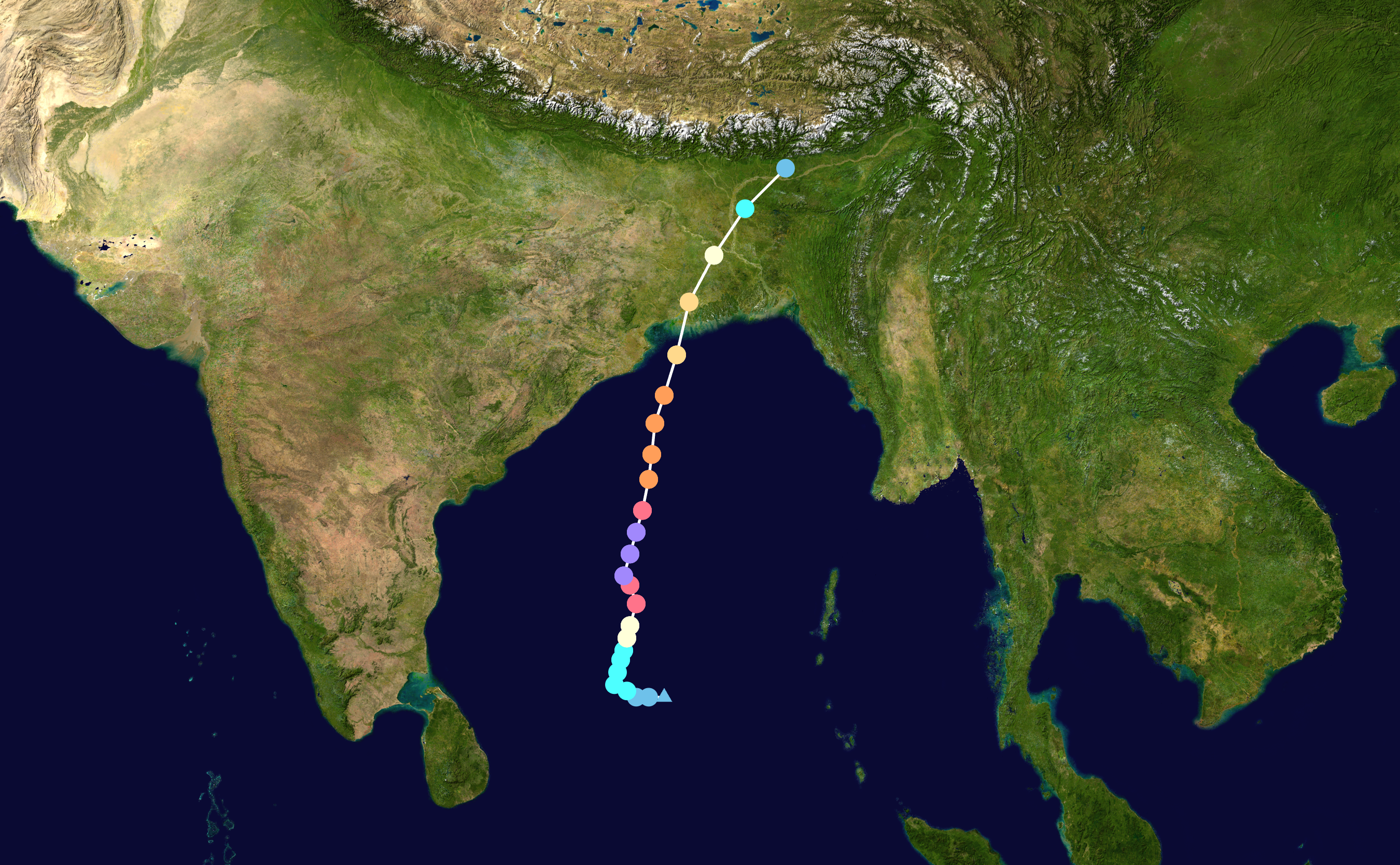
- Duration: May 16 – May 20
- Peak intensity: 240 km/h (150 mph) (3-min); 920 hPa (mbar)

At 00:00 UTC on May 16, a depression formed in the southeast Bay of Bengal and was identified as BOB 01. Six hours later, the India Meteorological Department (IMD) upgraded the system to a deep depression. The system began bringing torrential rainfall to Sri Lanka and Southern India. Around 15:00 UTC, the system further developed into Cyclonic Storm Amphan. (Note: The name Amphan (Thai: อำพัน, [ʔam˧ pʰan˧]) was contributed by Thailand and means "amber" in Thai. The name could also be (Thai: อัมพร, [ʔam˧ pʰɔːn˧]), a poetic word for "sky.") That morning, landslide and flooding warnings were hoisted for parts of eastern Sri Lanka and the Indian state of Kerala were given expectations of torrential rainfall in the coming days. By 09:00 UTC on May 17, Amphan had intensified into a very severe cyclonic storm. Within 12 hours, the storm had developed an eye and started to rapidly intensify, becoming an extremely severe cyclonic storm. According to the JTWC, it explosively intensified from a Category 1-equivalent cyclone to a Category 4-equivalent cyclone in just 6 hours. The following morning around 10:30 UTC, the IMD upgraded Amphan to a super cyclonic storm with 3-minute sustained winds of 240 km/h (150 mph) and a minimum pressure of 920 hectopascals (27.17 inHg). This marked the second year in a row featuring a super cyclonic storm, the previous year seeing Kyarr in the Arabian Sea. On May 20, at approximately 17:30 IST, the cyclone made landfall near Bakkhali, West Bengal after weakening subsequently. It rapidly weakened once inland, and dissipated on the next day. It left behind a trail of catastrophic damage, and was later confirmed to be the costliest storm ever recorded in the basin, until Cyclone Senyar surpassed it in November 2025.

=== Depression ARB 01 ===
- Depression (IMD)
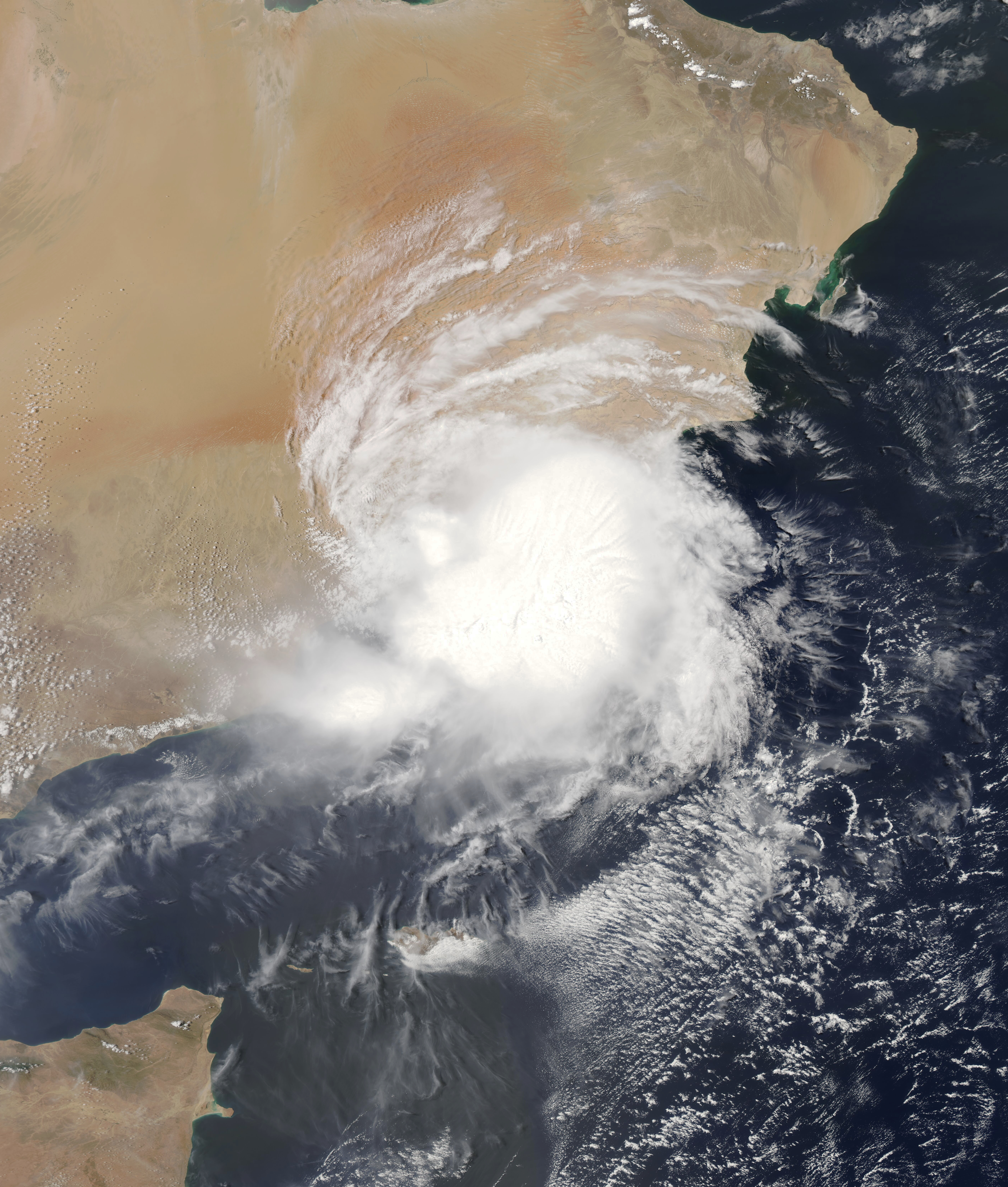
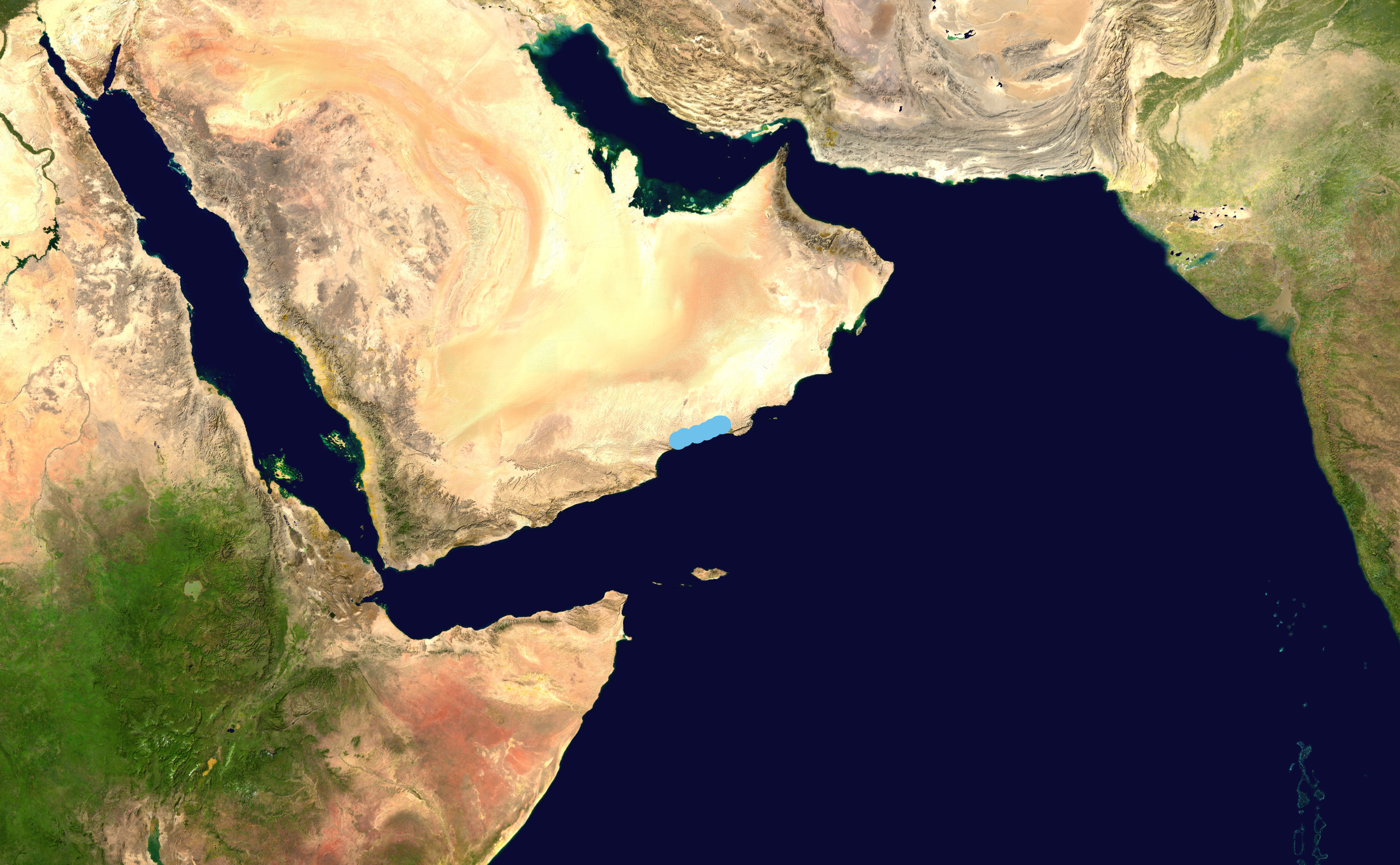
- Duration: May 29 – May 31
- Peak intensity: 45 km/h (30 mph) (3-min); 1000 hPa (mbar)

A depression formed overland near Salalah, Oman on May 29.

The Public Authority for Civil Aviation (PACA) in Oman advised residents to exercise caution and not to venture to low-lying areas or sea. The Supreme Committee asked people to remain at home in non-emergency circumstances. The hospital in Sadah was evacuated as the depression intensified. Over 200 mm (7.9 in) of rain fell in Dhofar Governorate on May 29; some areas received the equivalent of 2 years of rainfall. The highest precipitation total was measured in Mirbat, where 1,055 mm (41.5 in) of rain fell. 2 days of heavy rainfall, accumulating to 260 mm (10 in), caused floods in Salalah. Operations at the port of Salalah were interrupted by the tropical depression. Residents in central Salalah experienced disruptions to power and water services. Military police were dispatched to clear roads and airlift people marooned by the floods. Engineering teams from the Ministry of Defence were deployed to restore utilities and render air where necessary. 2 people were found dead in a wadi due to flash floods, while another person died and three were injured when a building collapsed. More than 50 people were rescued from floods.

=== Severe Cyclonic Storm Nisarga ===
- Severe cyclonic storm (IMD)
- Category 2 tropical cyclone (SSHWS)
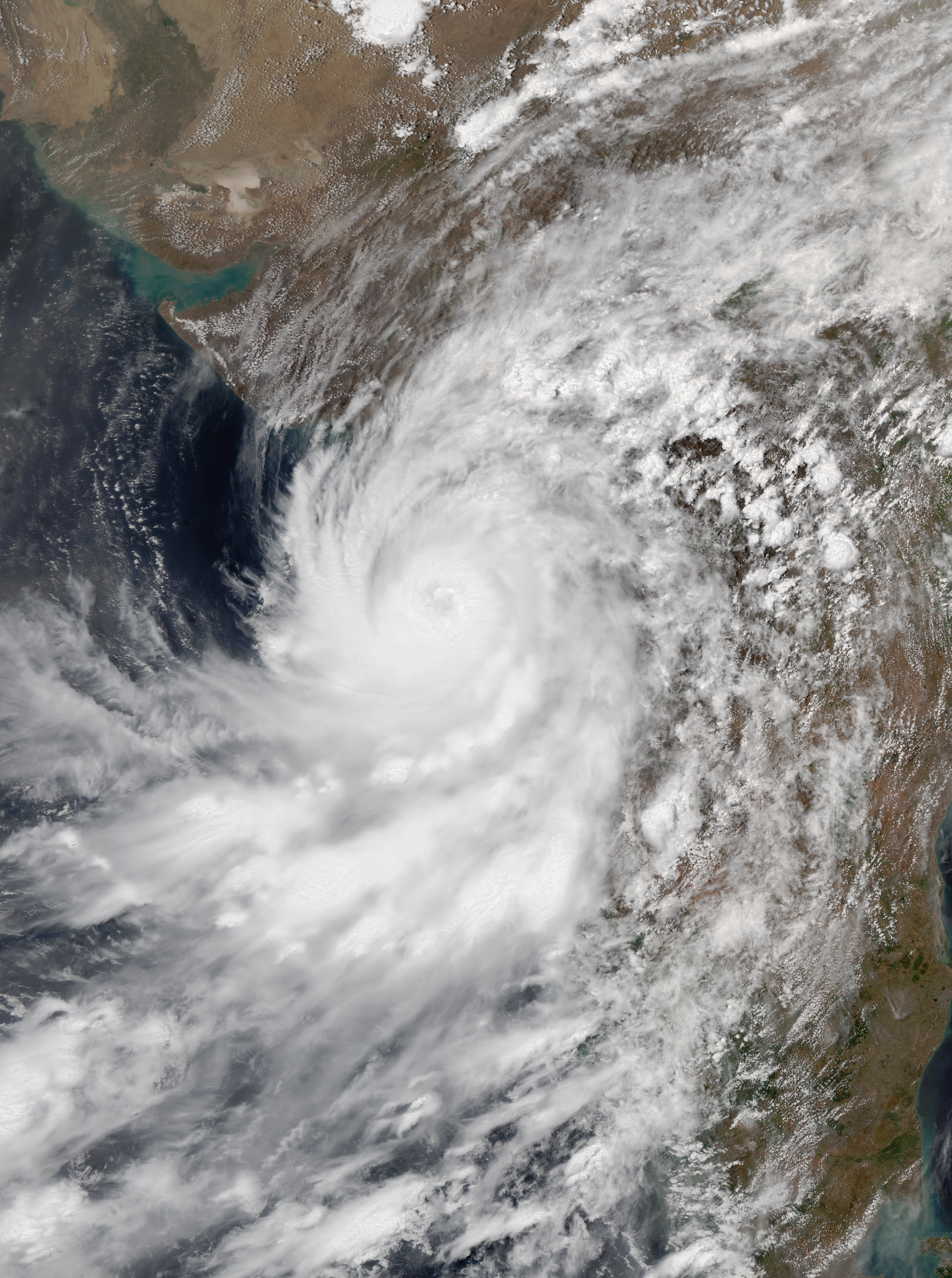
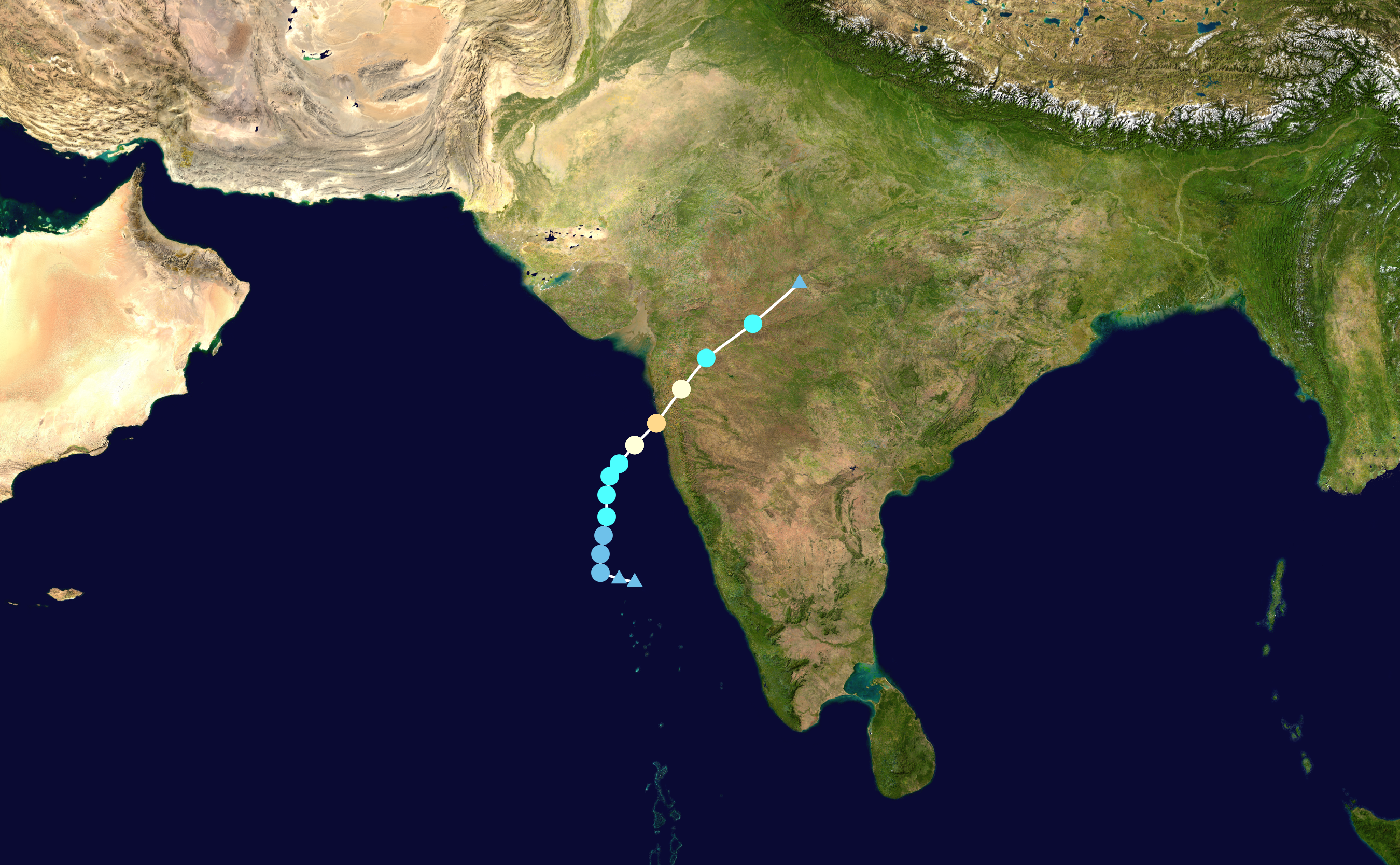
- Duration: June 1 – June 4
- Peak intensity: 110 km/h (70 mph) (3-min); 984 hPa (mbar)

During May 31, an area of low pressure developed over the south-eastern Arabian Sea and remained as a well marked low-pressure area over the same region until the evening. It strengthened into a depression over the east-central and south-east Arabian Sea in the early morning of June 1 when it was centered about 340 km south-west of Goa, 630 km south-southwest of Mumbai and 850 km south-southwest of Gujarat. It gave nearly 400 mm of extremely heavy rain at Kavaratti, Lakshadweep. On June 2, around noon, the prevailing deep depression intensified into a cyclonic storm thereby receiving the name Nisarga. (Note: The name Nisarga (Bengali: নিসর্গ; [nisɔɾgɔ]) was contributed by Bangladesh and means "nature" in Bengali.) Nisarga intensified into a severe cyclonic storm before making landfall near the coastal town of Alibag in Maharashtra at 12:30 (IST) on June 3. At the time, the system was at peak intensity with 3-minute sustained winds of 110 km/h (70 mph) and a central pressure of 984 hPa (29.06 inHg). The cyclone subsequently weakened into a deep depression by June 4.

=== Deep Depression BOB 02 ===
- Deep depression (IMD)
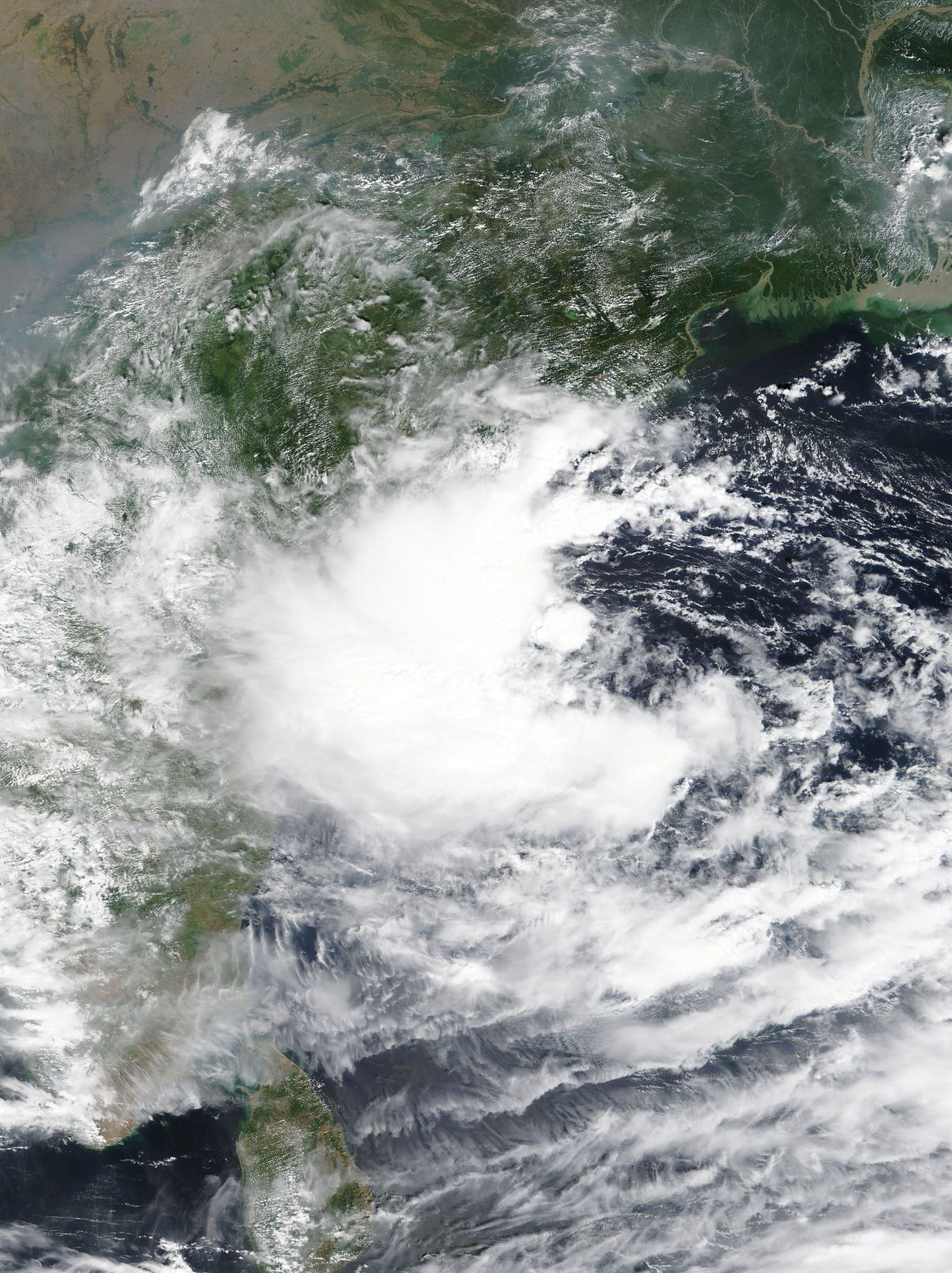
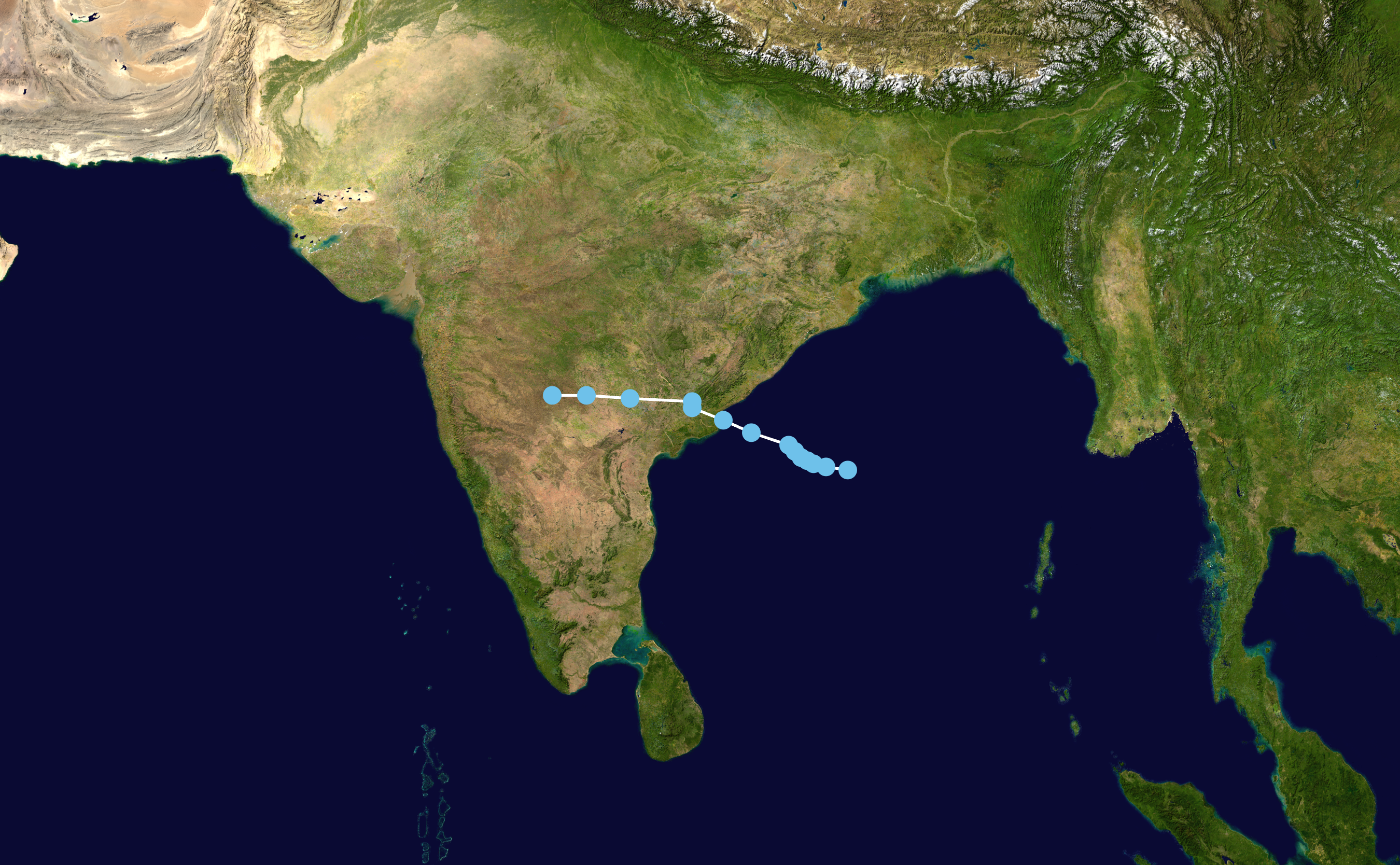
- Duration: October 11 – October 14
- Peak intensity: 55 km/h (35 mph) (3-min); 999 hPa (mbar)

After 3 months of inactivity, on October 11, a depression developed over the west-central Bay of Bengal, though the system was originally observed near the Spratly Islands over the South China Sea on October 6. It continued to move westwards, making landfall in the Khánh Hòa province and further weakened into a low pressure cell while crossing the Indochina Peninsula and re-emerged in the Andaman Sea on October 9. It intensified into a well-marked low-pressure area and then into a depression over the Bay of Bengal on October 10. It further intensified into a deep depression on October 12, remaining practically stationary over the same region. After that, BOB 02 moved west-northwestwards and made landfall in Andhra Pradesh near Kakinada in the early hours of October 13 and weakened again into a depression. The system weakened into a well-marked low-pressure area in south-central Maharashtra on the evening of October 14. Though the system's lower-level circulation was partially exposed due to high vertical wind shear and continuous land interaction, the JTWC re-issued a tropical cyclone advisory on October 15. The IMD also forecasted BOB 02 to reintensify in the Arabian Sea. The low-pressure area intensified into Depression ARB 03 on the early hours of October 17.

Due to BOB 02, Yanam (Puducherry), Andhra Pradesh, Telangana, Kerala, Maharashtra, and coastal Karnataka experienced heavy rain on October 12 and 13, with Hyderabad experiencing 32 cm of record-breaking torrential rain, creating flash floods in the city by October 13. At least 50 people died in different parts of Telangana (of which at least 19 were in the capital city of Hyderabad), 10 in Andhra Pradesh, and 38 in Maharashtra. Extreme crop loss in north Karnataka, Andhra Pradesh and Telangana occurred due to the system. The Telangana CM estimated damage costs to be ₹1,305 crore (US$682 million).

The system delayed the withdrawal of the southwest monsoon season by almost a week, a delay compounded by the formation of Depression ARB 03 and Depression BOB 03.

=== Depression ARB 03 ===
- Depression (IMD)
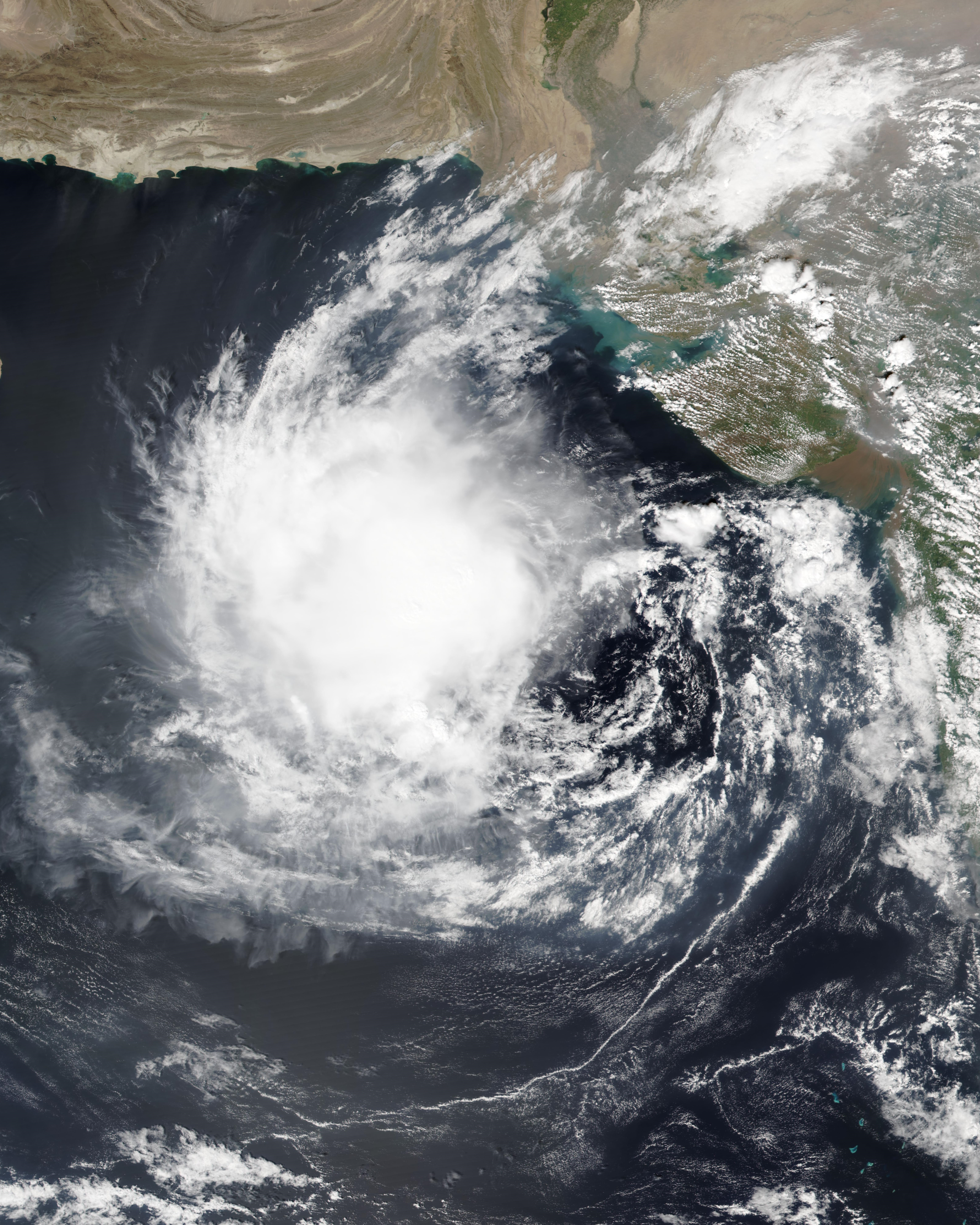
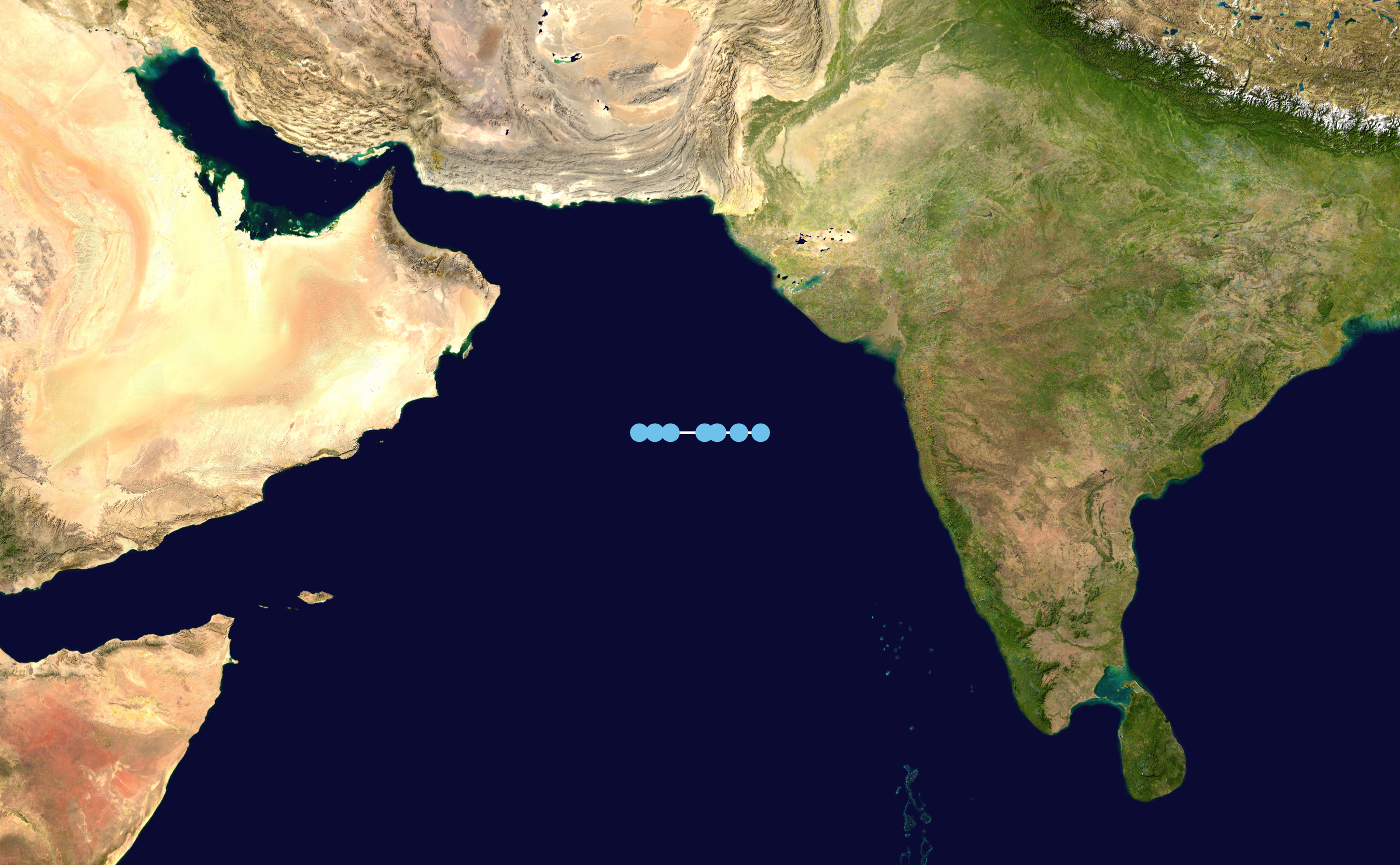
- Duration: October 17 – October 19
- Peak intensity: 45 km/h (30 mph) (3-min); 1000 hPa (mbar)

On October 17, the remnants of Deep Depression BOB 02 intensified into a depression in the East Central Arabian Sea. Moving westwards, the system dissipated into a well marked low pressure on the morning of October 19 over the West Central Arabian Sea due to unfavorable atmospheric conditions.

Fishermen were advised not to go out to sea due to very rough sea conditions. Heavy rainfall occurred off the coast of Mumbai and its surroundings due to the system. No warnings were issued by IMD as no landfall occurred in the Arabian Peninsula.

Monsoon withdrawal was delayed in Maharashtra by a week due to ARB 03.

=== Depression BOB 03 ===
- Depression (IMD)
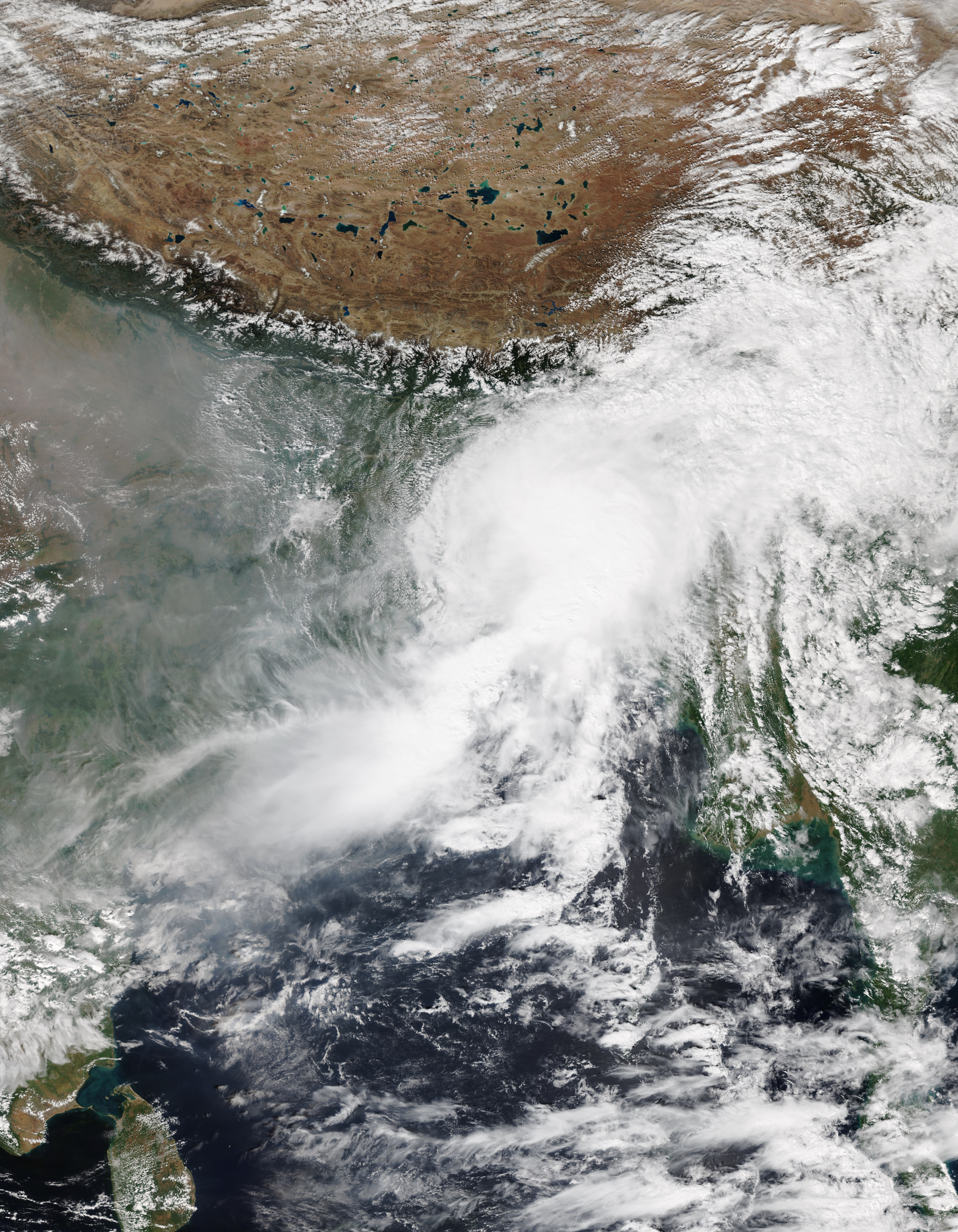
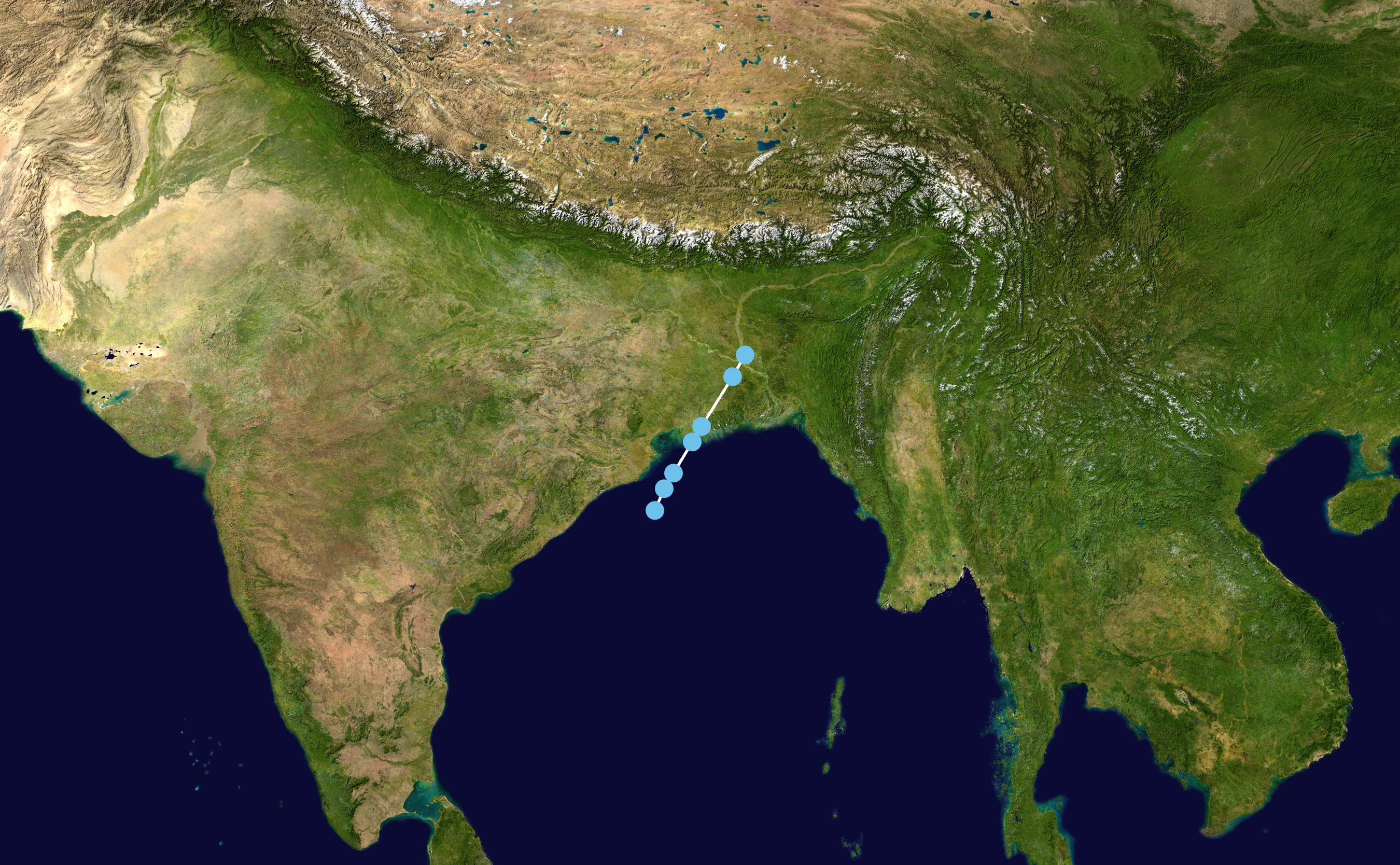
- Duration: October 22 – October 24
- Peak intensity: 45 km/h (30 mph) (3-min); 1000 hPa (mbar)

On October 20, a low pressure formed over Central Bay of Bengal. The system then became more well-marked on October 21 over West Central Bay of Bengal. It further intensified into depression over northwest Bay of Bengal and adjoining Odisha Coast. The system crossed West Bengal's North 24 Parganas and South 24 Parganas and moved over the adjoining Bangladeshi coast on the noon of October 23 with the maximum wind speed of 45 km/h (30 mph). The system weakened into a well marked low-pressure area, 50 km north-northwest of Dhaka on the morning of October 24.

=== Very Severe Cyclonic Storm Gati ===
- Very severe cyclonic storm (IMD)
- Category 3 tropical cyclone (SSHWS)
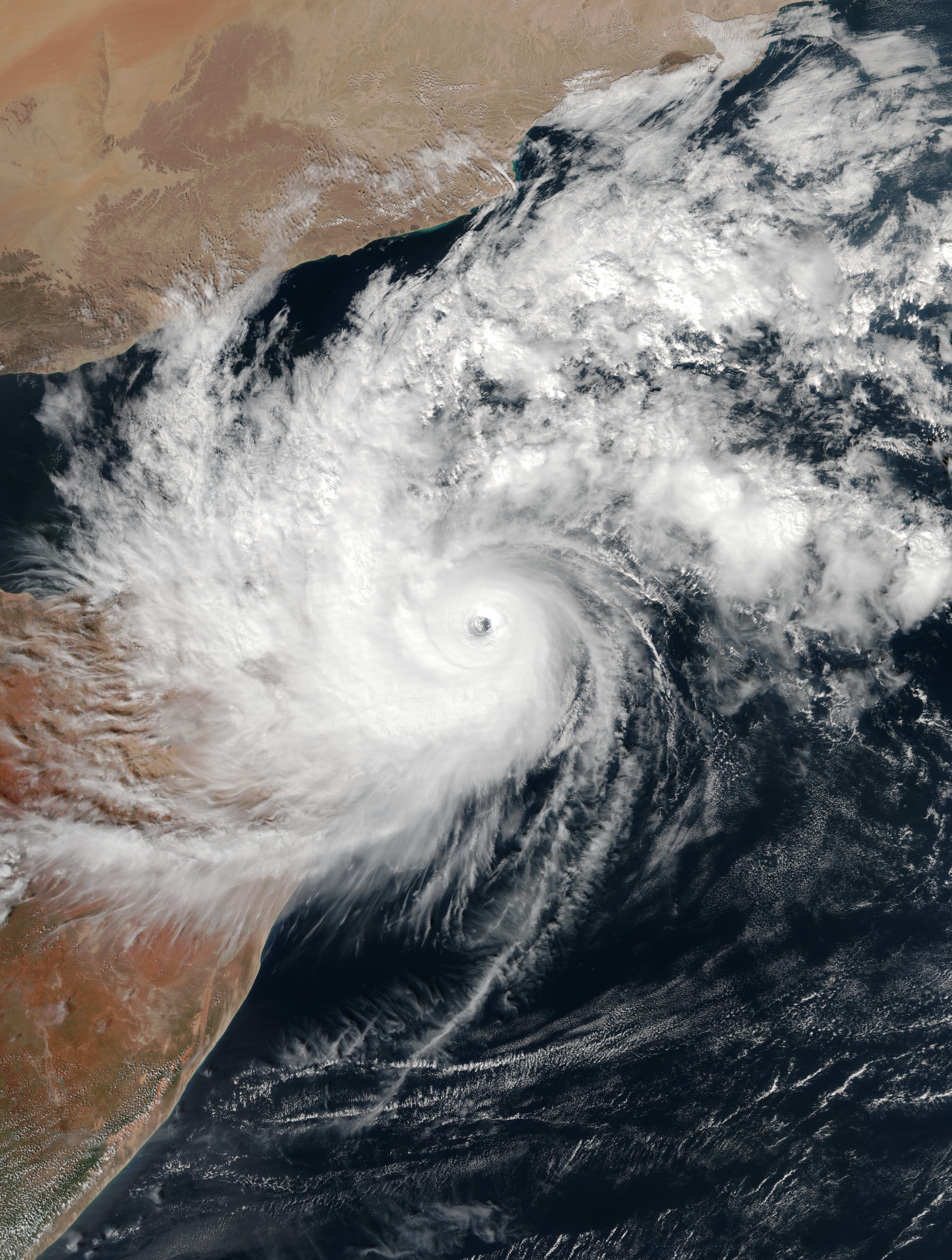
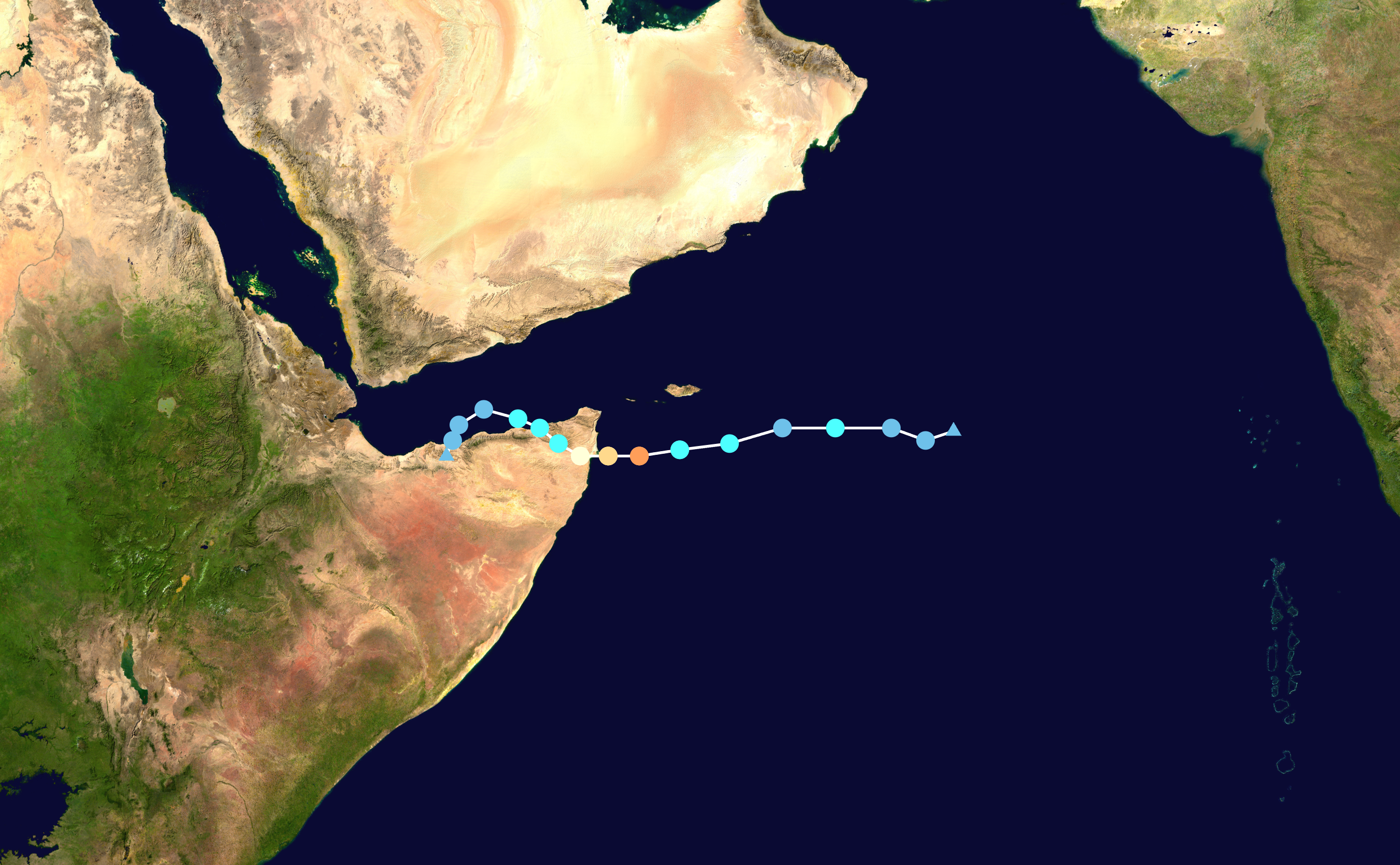
- Duration: November 21 – November 24
- Peak intensity: 140 km/h (85 mph) (3-min); 976 hPa (mbar)

On November 17, the India Meteorological Department (IMD) noted the potential for tropical cyclogenesis over the central Arabian Sea in association with an area of low pressure near the Maldives. Convective activity was enhanced by the Madden–Julian oscillation while sea surface temperatures of 29 to 30 °C (84 to 86 °F) and low wind shear favored additional development. By November 18, a weak low-level circulation developed about 1,185 km (736 mi) east-southeast of Socotra. Organization thereafter was stymied as it became embedded within a monsoon trough. Two additional circulations developed to the east and west of the original low; however, the original low steadily became the dominant system by absorbing the previous two circulations. On November 21, two scatterometer passes revealed a single, well-defined low with gale-force winds underneath an area of flaring convection. At 18:00 UTC, the IMD classified the system as Depression ARB 04 about 410 km (250 mi) east-southeast of Socotra. Similarly, the Joint Typhoon Warning Center (JTWC) initiated advisories on the system as Tropical Cyclone 03A. Steered west by a subtropical ridge to the north, little intensification was expected before the cyclone's forecast landfall in Somalia.

During the overnight of 21 to November 22 the small cyclone quickly organized, with a well-defined eye developing. The IMD upgraded the system to a Deep Depression early on November 21 and a Cyclonic Storm soon after. Upon becoming a cyclonic storm, it was assigned the name Gati. (Note: The name Gati (Hindi: गति; [ɡɐ.tiː]) was contributed by India and means "motion, speed" in Hindi.) Classified as a "midget system" by the JTWC with a core diameter of only 120 km (75 mi) and a 27 km (17 mi) wide eye, Gati explosively intensified that morning. Within a 12-hour period, the JTWC estimated one-minute sustained winds to have increased from 65 km/h (40 mph) to a peak of 185 km/h (115 mph). This was the fastest intensification during such a short period ever observed in the North Indian Ocean basin. The system's small size enabled it to take advantage of low wind shear and high sea surface temperatures. The IMD assessed Gati to have reached its peak intensity as a Very Severe Cyclonic Storm around 12:00 UTC, with three-minute sustained winds of 140 km/h (85 mph) and a minimum pressure of 976 mbar (28.82 inHg). Six hours later, Gati had made landfall near Hafun in northeastern Somalia with estimated one-minute sustained winds of 165 km/h (105 mph). This made Gati the first hurricane-force cyclone to strike the country since reliable records began and by default the nation's strongest.

Once onshore, land friction-based shear caused convection to quickly become displaced from the storm's center. The low-level circulation became completely exposed early on November 23 as it traversed northeastern Somalia; the system's upper-level circulation and associated convection detached and accelerated west ahead of the surface low. The increasingly elongated circulation of Gati emerged over the Gulf of Aden by 12:00 UTC, and the JTWC issued their final advisory on the system shortly thereafter.

=== Very Severe Cyclonic Storm Nivar ===
- Very severe cyclonic storm (IMD)
- Category 1 tropical cyclone (SSHWS)
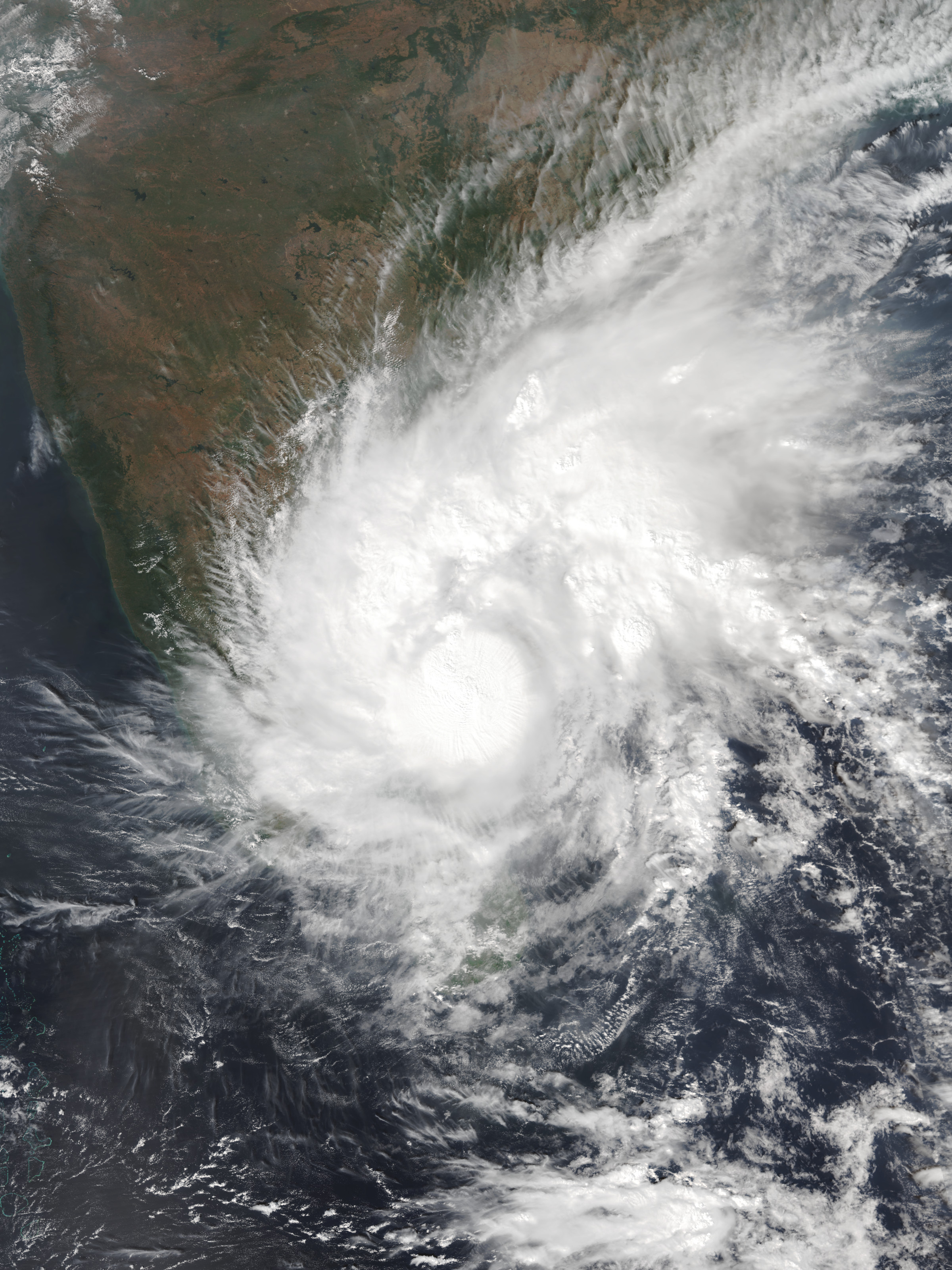
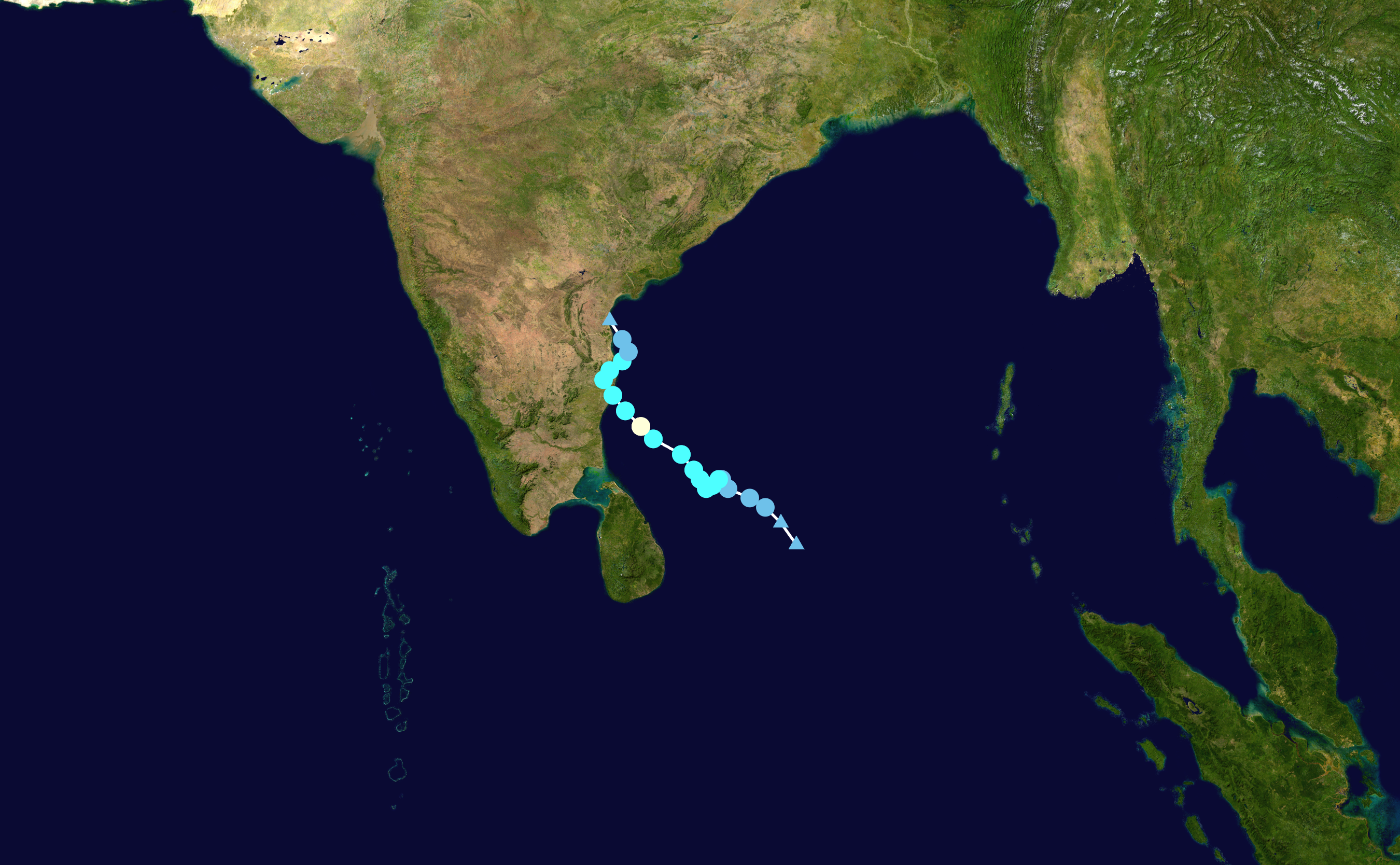
- Duration: November 23 – November 27
- Peak intensity: 120 km/h (75 mph) (3-min); 982 hPa (mbar)

On November 22, an area of low pressure was formed in the Bay of Bengal, off the coast of Tamil Nadu. On the same day, the JTWC issued a Tropical Cyclone Formation Alert on the disturbance. It intensified into a depression on the early hours of November 23, as the JTWC also cited that the disturbance intensified into a tropical storm, designating it as Tropical Cyclone 04B. Early on November 24, it intensified into a cyclonic storm and it was named Nivar. (Note: The name Nivar (Persian: نیوار, [niːˈvæːɾ]) was contributed by Iran and means "air, atmosphere" in Persian.) It gradually intensified into a Very Severe Cyclonic Storm, reaching its peak intensity. Due to the wind shear, it weakened to a Severe cyclonic storm, shortly before making landfall between Karaikal and Mamallapuram around Puducherry(also known as Pondicherry), Wednesday evening. It reemerged on the Bay of Bengal as a strong deep depression before making its last landfall at Andhra Pradesh before weakening to a well marked low pressure on the morning of November 27.

The IMD issued cyclone warnings early on November 24 on Tamil Nadu, Pondicherry and the country of Sri Lanka as the cyclonic storm accelerates and intensifies.

=== Cyclonic Storm Burevi ===
- Cyclonic storm (IMD)
- Tropical storm (SSHWS)
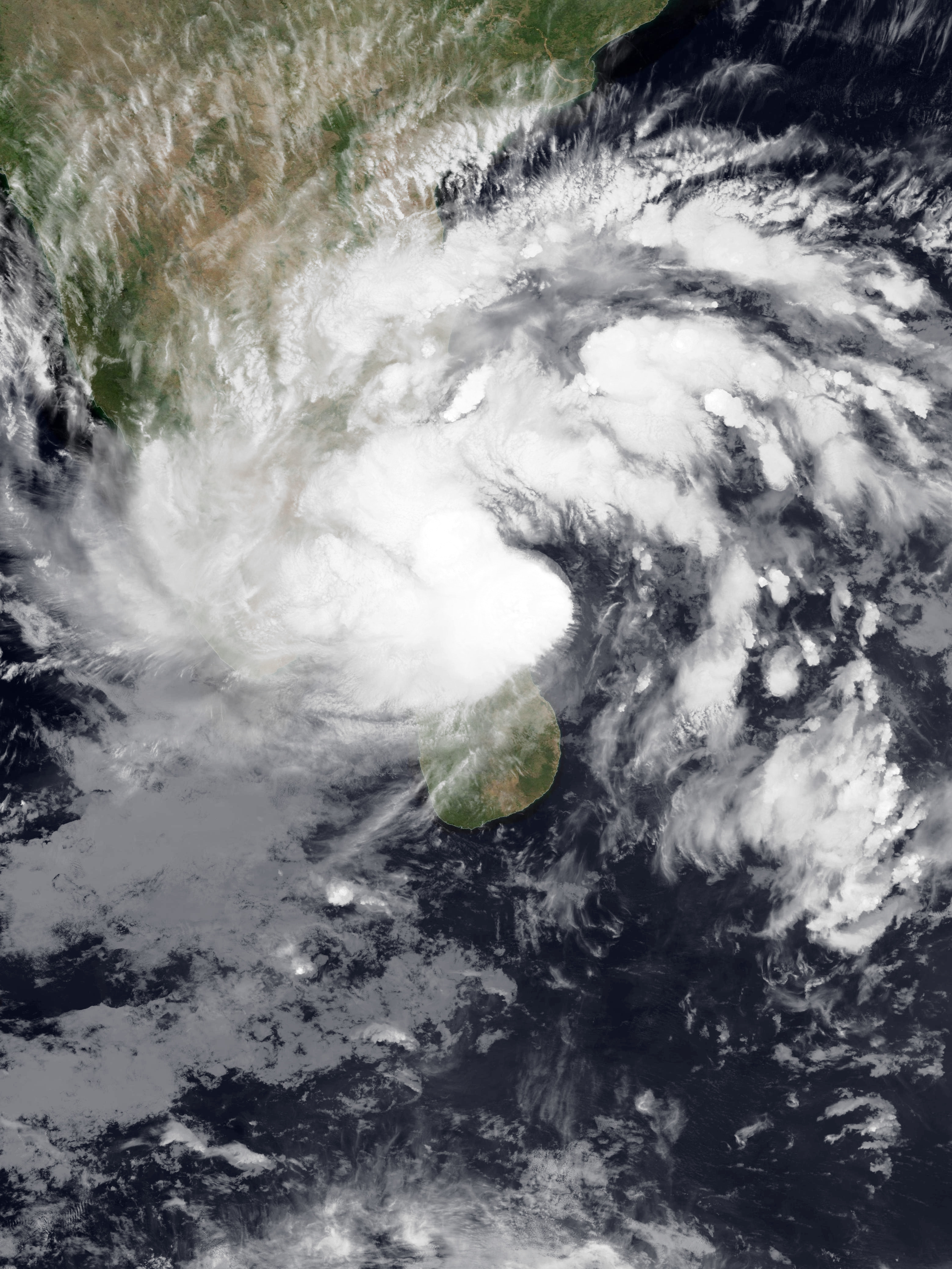
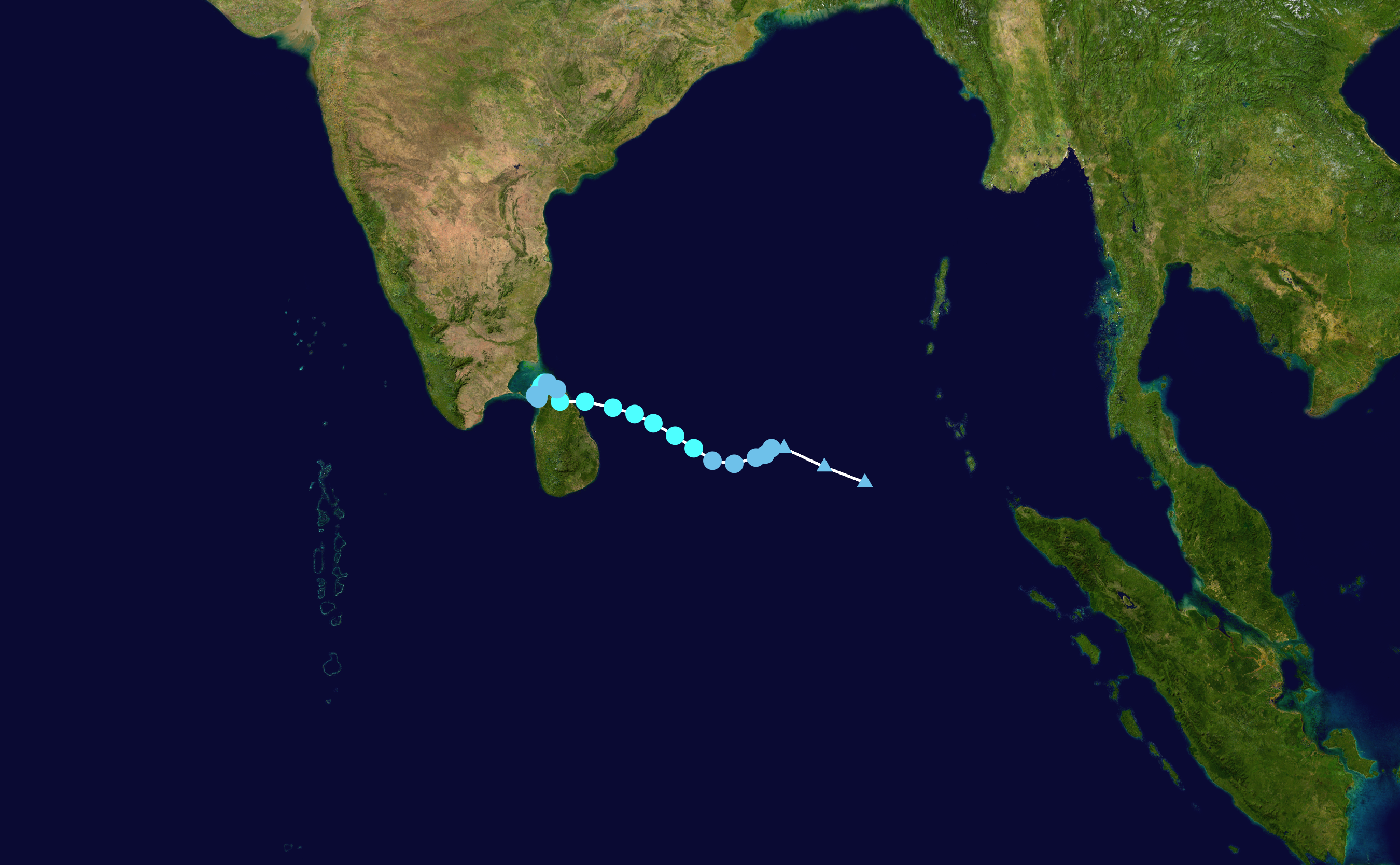
- Duration: November 30 – December 5
- Peak intensity: 85 km/h (50 mph) (3-min); 996 hPa (mbar)

On November 28, a low-pressure area formed off the coast of Aceh. It gradually intensified into a depression on November 30. The JTWC then issued a Tropical Cyclone Formation Alert on the system, that same day. At 03:00 UTC on December 1, the depression was upgraded into a deep depression. At 15:00 UTC, both the IMD and JTWC upgraded it to a cyclonic storm and tropical storm respectively and it was named Burevi. (Note: The name Burevi (Dhivehi: ބުރެވި; [buɾeʋi]) was contributed by the Maldives and refers to the black mangrove (Lumnitzera racemosa) in Dhivehi.) At this time, microwave imagery showed well-defined convective banding wrapping tightly around the low-level circulation (LLCC). At 15:00 UTC on December 2, Burevi reached its peak intensity with 1-minute sustained winds of around 85 km/h (55 mph) and a barometric pressure of 996 mbar (29.4 inHg). Shortly afterwards, Burevi made landfall along the east coast of Sri Lanka according to the Sri Lanka's Department of Meteorology.

After weakening over Sri Lanka, Burevi exited into the Gulf of Mannar, early on December 3. However, Burevi slowed down quickly as it became stuck in a col between two subtropical ridges on December 4; thus it stalled just west of Sri Lanka while it weakened back down to the equivalent of a tropical depression due to increasing vertical wind shear. At 06:00 UTC on December 5, Burevi degenerated into an area of low pressure according to the IMD.

== Storm names ==
Within this basin, a tropical cyclone is assigned a name when it is judged to have reached cyclonic storm intensity with winds of 65 km/h (40 mph). The names were selected by members of the ESCAP/WMO panel on Tropical Cyclones between 2000 and May 2004, before the Regional Specialized Meteorological Center in New Delhi started to assign names in September 2004. There is no retirement of tropical cyclone names in this basin as the list of names is only scheduled to be used once before a new list of names is drawn up. Should a named tropical cyclone move into the basin from the Western Pacific, then it will retain its original name. The next eight names from the list of North Indian Ocean storm names are listed below. Amphan is the last name from the original naming list published in 2004, while Nisarga is the first name from the new naming list published in 2020.

- Amphan
- Nisarga
- Gati
- Nivar
- Burevi

== Season effects ==
This is a table of all storms in the 2020 North Indian Ocean cyclone season. It mentions all of the season's storms and their names, duration, peak intensities (according to the IMD storm scale), damage, and death totals. Damage and death totals include the damage and deaths caused when that storm was a precursor wave or extratropical low, and all of the damage figures are in 2020 USD.

Name	Dates	Peak intensity			Areas affected	Damage (USD)	Deaths	Ref(s).
Name	Dates	Category	Wind speed	Pressure	Areas affected	Damage (USD)	Deaths	Ref(s).
Amphan	May 16 – 21	Super cyclonic storm	240 km/h (150 mph)	920 hPa (27.17 inHg)	West Bengal, Odisha, Bangladesh, Sri Lanka, Bhutan	$15.5 billion	133	
ARB 01	May 29 – 31	Depression	45 km/h (30 mph)	1000 hPa (29.53 inHg)	Oman, Yemen	Unknown	3	
Nisarga	June 1 – 4	Severe cyclonic storm	110 km/h (70 mph)	984 hPa (29.06 inHg)	Maharashtra, Goa	$803 million	6	
BOB 02	October 11 – 14	Deep depression	55 km/h (35 mph)	999 hPa (29.50 inHg)	Andhra Pradesh, Puducherry, Telangana, Kerala, Karnataka, Goa, Maharashtra	$1.23 billion	104	
ARB 03	October 17 – 19	Depression	45 km/h (30 mph)	1000 hPa (29.53 inHg)	Maharashtra	None	None	
BOB 03	October 22 – 24	Depression	45 km/h (30 mph)	1000 hPa (29.53 inHg)	West Bengal, Bangladesh, Northeast India	None	None	
Gati	November 21 – 24	Very severe cyclonic storm	140 km/h (85 mph)	976 hPa (28.82 inHg)	Somalia, Yemen, Djibouti	Unknown	9	
Nivar	November 23 – 27	Very severe cyclonic storm	120 km/h (75 mph)	982 hPa (29.00 inHg)	Sri Lanka, Andhra Pradesh, Tamil Nadu, Puducherry	$600 million	14	
Burevi	November 30 – December 5	Cyclonic storm	85 km/h (55 mph)	996 hPa (29.41 inHg)	Sri Lanka, Tamil Nadu, Kerala	Unknown	11	
Season aggregates
9 systems	May 16 – December 5		240 km/h (150 mph)	920 hPa (27.17 inHg)		$18.1 billion	280	

== See also ==
- Weather of 2020
- Tropical cyclones in 2020
- North Indian Ocean cyclone season
- 2020 Atlantic hurricane season
- 2020 Pacific hurricane season
- 2020 Pacific typhoon season
- South-West Indian Ocean cyclone seasons: 2019–20, 2020–21
- Australian region cyclone seasons: 2019–20, 2020–21
- South Pacific cyclone seasons: 2019–20, 2020–21
