= Cyclone Nisarga =

North Indian Ocean cyclone in 2020

Severe Cyclonic Storm Nisarga
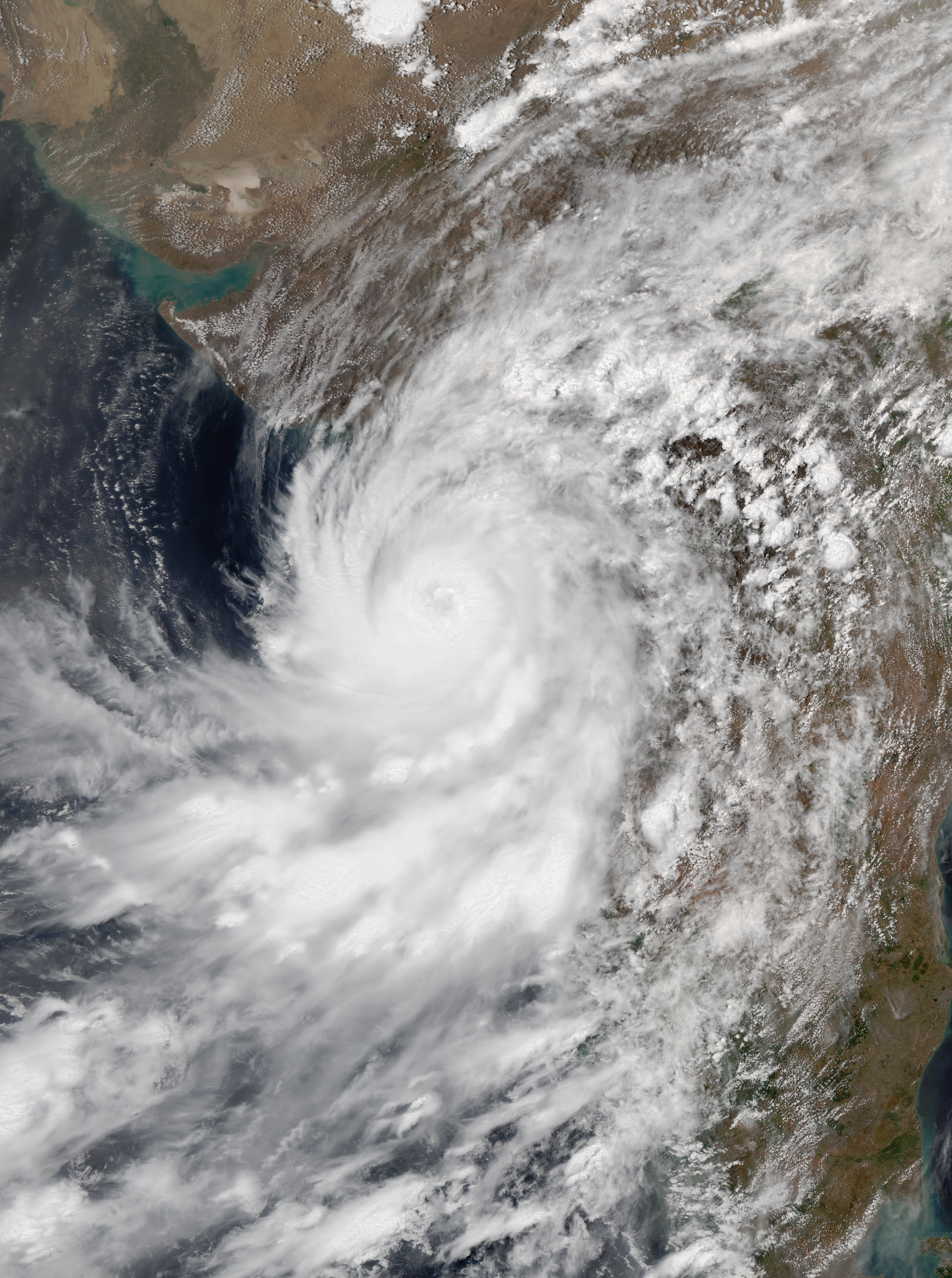
- Nisarga making landfall on Maharashtra on 3 June

Meteorological history
- Formed: 1 June 2020
- Dissipated: 4 June 2020

Severe cyclonic storm
- 3-minute sustained (IMD)
- Highest winds: 110 km/h (70 mph)
- Lowest pressure: 984 hPa (mbar); 29.06 inHg

Category 2-equivalent tropical cyclone
- 1-minute sustained (SSHWS/JTWC)
- Highest winds: 155 km/h (100 mph)
- Lowest pressure: 968 hPa (mbar); 28.59 inHg

Overall effects
- Fatalities: 6 total
- Damage: $803 million (2020 USD)
- Areas affected: India (Maharashtra, Gujarat)
- IBTrACS
- Part of the 2020 North Indian Ocean cyclone season

Severe Cyclonic Storm Nisarga (Note: The name Nisarga (Bengali: নিসর্গ; [nisɔɾgɔ]) was contributed by Bangladesh and means "nature" in Bengali.) was a tropical cyclone that struck the Indian state of Maharashtra in 2020. It was the largest cyclone to strike the state in June since 1891. It was also the first cyclone to impact Raigad and Mumbai since Phyan in 2009.

The third depression and second named cyclone of the 2020 North Indian Ocean cyclone season, Nisarga originated as a low-pressure area in the Arabian Sea and moved generally northward. On 2 June, the India Meteorological Department (IMD) upgraded the system to a cyclonic storm, assigning the name Nisarga. On the next day, Nisarga further intensified into a severe cyclonic storm, turning northeast and making landfall approximately 95 km south of Mumbai on 3 June at peak intensity. Nisarga rapidly weakened once inland and dissipated on 4 June.

Nisarga was the second cyclone to strike the Indian subcontinent within two weeks, following Cyclone Amphan, which devastated West Bengal in May 2020. Making landfall in Maharashtra with winds of 110 km/h (70 mph), Nisarga became the strongest storm to strike the state in June since 1891.

== Meteorological history ==
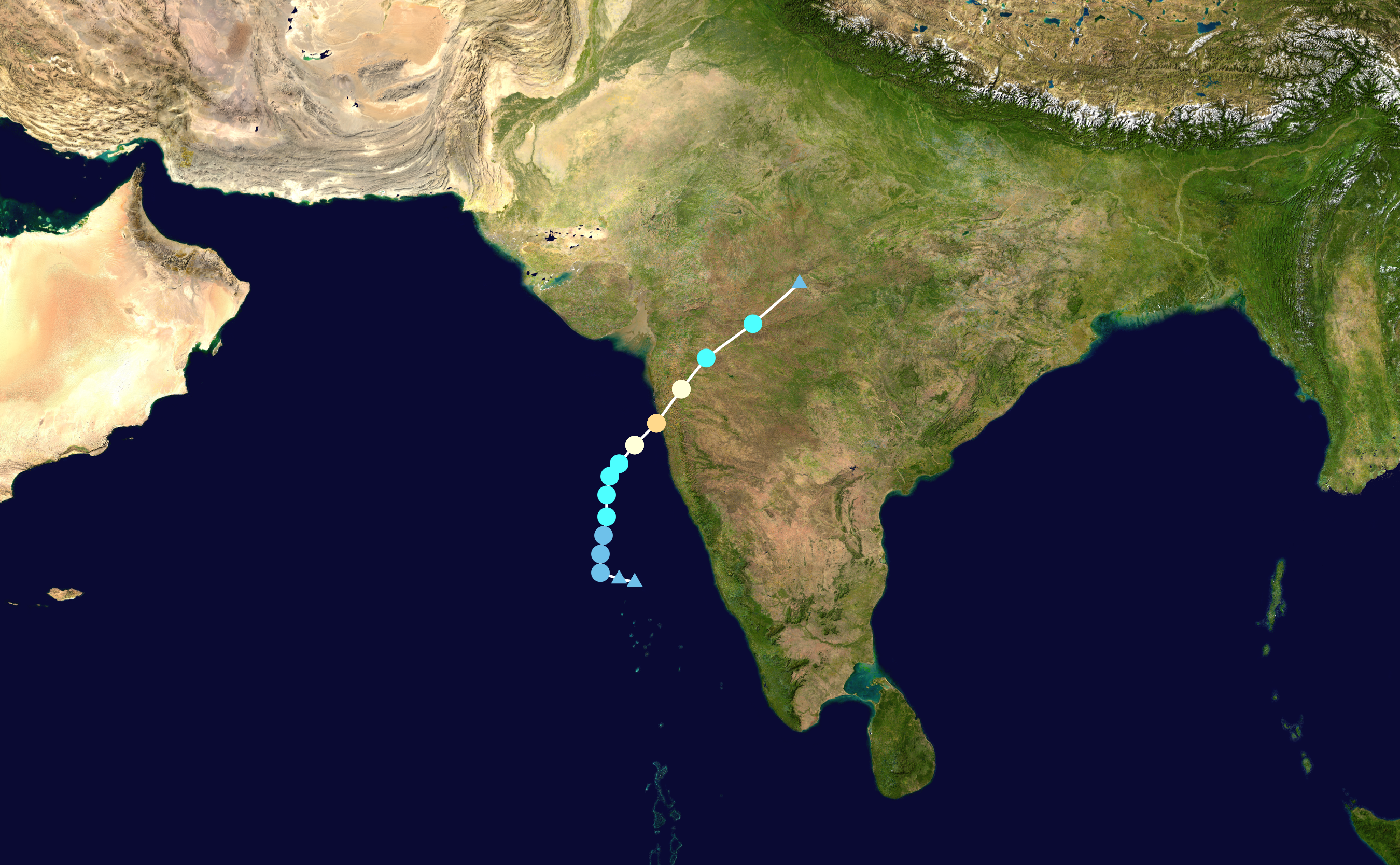
Map plotting the storm's track and intensity, according to the Saffir–Simpson scale Map key Saffir–Simpson scale Tropical depression (≤38 mph, ≤62 km/h) Tropical storm (39–73 mph, 63–118 km/h) Category 1 (74–95 mph, 119–153 km/h) Category 2 (96–110 mph, 154–177 km/h) Category 3 (111–129 mph, 178–208 km/h) Category 4 (130–156 mph, 209–251 km/h) Category 5 (≥157 mph, ≥252 km/h) Unknown Storm type Tropical cyclone Subtropical cyclone Extratropical cyclone, remnant low, tropical disturbance, or monsoon depression

On 31 May, a low-pressure area developed over the eastern Arabian Sea, remaining well-marked throughout the day. It strengthened into a depression early on 1 June, later intensifying into a deep depression.

Around noon on 2 June, the system intensified into a cyclonic storm, receiving the name Nisarga, contributed by Bangladesh.

It reached peak intensity with winds of 110 km/h (70 mph) as a severe cyclonic storm, with one-minute sustained winds estimated at 140 km/h (85 mph) (Category 1 hurricane equivalent). At 12:30 IST (07:00 UTC) on 3 June, Nisarga made landfall near Alibag, Maharashtra. Ratnagiri recorded the highest wind speed of 110 km/h and minimum pressure of 984 hPa. After making landfall, Nisarga moved northeastward and rapidly weakened due to increased wind shear and cooler land temperatures. By the evening of 3 June, the system had weakened to a cyclonic storm, and further degraded to a deep depression overnight. Nisarga fully dissipated on 4 June 2020 over west Vidarbha, having travelled approximately 1,294 km in total.

== Preparations ==
On 1 June, Union Home Minister Amit Shah held a review meeting with the National Disaster Management Authority, National Disaster Response Force (NDRF), India Meteorological Department, and Indian Coast Guard. On the same day, 33 NDRF teams were deployed in the coastal regions of Maharashtra and Gujarat. Fishermen from Maharashtra were alerted to return from the sea.

Indian Prime Minister Narendra Modi, via a tweet on 2 June, updated that he spoke to Chief Minister of Maharashtra, Chief Minister of Gujarat and Administrator of Dadra and Nagar Haveli and Daman and Diu while assuring all possible support and assistance from the Central Government. As a precaution, 100,000 people were evacuated ahead of the storm.

== Impact and aftermath ==
Nisarga caused 6 deaths and 16 injuries in the state. Over 5,033 ha (12,440 acres) of land were damaged. Chief Minister of Maharashtra Uddhav Thackeray announced an immediate aid of ₹400,000 (US$5,000) to the relatives of the deaths. Later, Thackeray announced another Rs1 billion (US$13.3 million) to Raigad district. The Government of Maharashtra put the total damage from Nisarga at Rs.60.48 billion (US$803 million), and the state required Rs11 billion (US$146 million) to recover from the damage caused by Nisarga.

The relief activity of the state government was panned for its effectiveness. The slowdown in providing relief was cited due to the peak moment COVID-19 in the state. A month later, 36,000 households electric supply yet to be restored, mainly due to pandemic followed by torrential monsoon activity early July. Damaged roads slowed down the process of loss evaluation of agricultural land. The ₹100 crore (US$10 million) relief package was criticised for been meagre by the state's opposition leader Devendra Fadnavis.

Government of Maharashtra estimated about ₹1,300 crore (US$130 million) aid for households affected. Slabs was decided for damage and materials lost and compensation was granted depending on the impact. While the compensation ranged from ₹15,000 (US$160) to ₹50,000 (US$520) for partial damage,₹1.5 lakh (US$1,600) was granted to families where houses were totally collapsed. Package of ₹24 crore (US$2.5 million) was allotted for the damaged 1,470 government schools and ₹2 lakh (US$2,100) each for damaged private schools in the affected districts. Cyclone Nisarga destroyed 23 out of 25 houses in Udaywadi village.

Cyclone Nisarga produced heavy rainfall in the states of Maharashtra and Gujarat. 72.5 mm of rain was recorded in Marahashtra, with Jalna receiving the most rainfall (152mm).

== See also ==
- Tropical cyclones in 2020
- Cyclone Phyan (2009)
- Cyclone Vayu (2019)
- Cyclone Amphan (2020)
- Cyclone Tauktae (2021)
