= Cyclone Nivar =

North Indian Ocean cyclone in 2020

Very Severe Cyclonic Storm Nivar
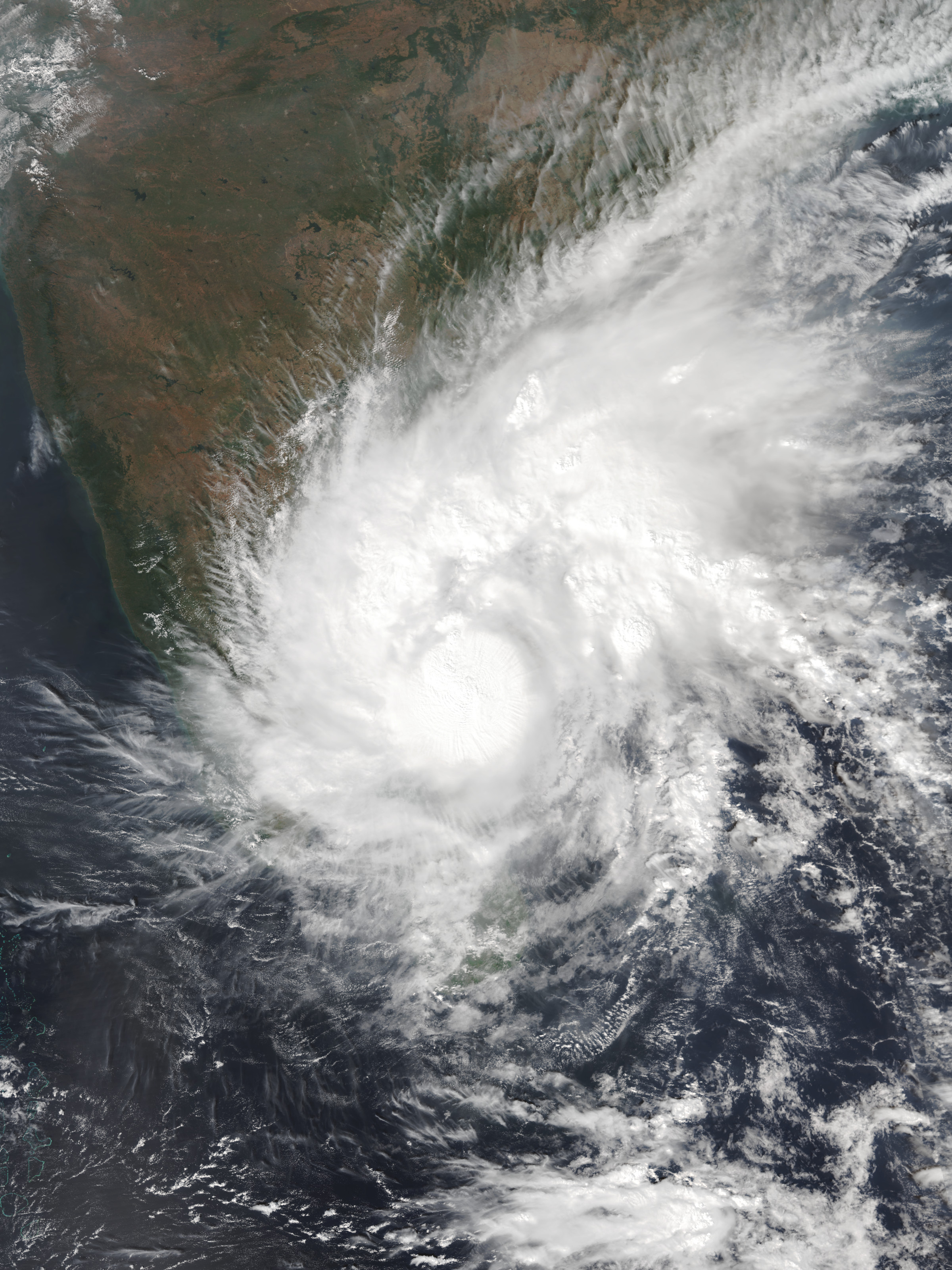
- Cyclone Nivar at peak strength on November 25

Meteorological history
- Formed: 23 November 2020
- Dissipated: 27 November 2020

Very severe cyclonic storm
- 3-minute sustained (IMD)
- Highest winds: 120 km/h (75 mph)
- Lowest pressure: 982 hPa (mbar); 29.00 inHg

Category 1-equivalent tropical cyclone
- 1-minute sustained (SSHWS/JTWC)
- Highest winds: 130 km/h (80 mph)
- Lowest pressure: 982 hPa (mbar); 29.00 inHg

Overall effects
- Fatalities: 14 total
- Damage: $600 million (2020 USD)
- Areas affected: Sri Lanka, Andhra Pradesh, Tamil Nadu, Puducherry
- IBTrACS
- Part of the 2020 North Indian Ocean cyclone season

Very Severe Cyclonic Storm Nivar (Note: The name Nivar (Persian: نیوار, [niːˈvæːɾ]) was contributed by Iran and means "air, atmosphere" in Persian.) was a tropical cyclone which brought severe impacts to portions of Tamil Nadu and Andhra Pradesh in late November 2020. The eighth depression and fourth named storm of the 2020 North Indian Ocean cyclone season, Nivar originated from a disturbance in the Intertropical Convergence Zone. The disturbance gradually organized and on 23 November, both the Joint Typhoon Warning Center (JTWC) and the India Meteorological Department (IMD) reported that a tropical depression had formed. On the next day, both agencies upgraded the system to a tropical storm, with the latter assigning it the name Nivar. Nivar made its landfall over north coastal Tamil Nadu between Puducherry and Chennai close to Marakkanam. Overall, Nivar caused $600 million in damages.

== Meteorological history ==
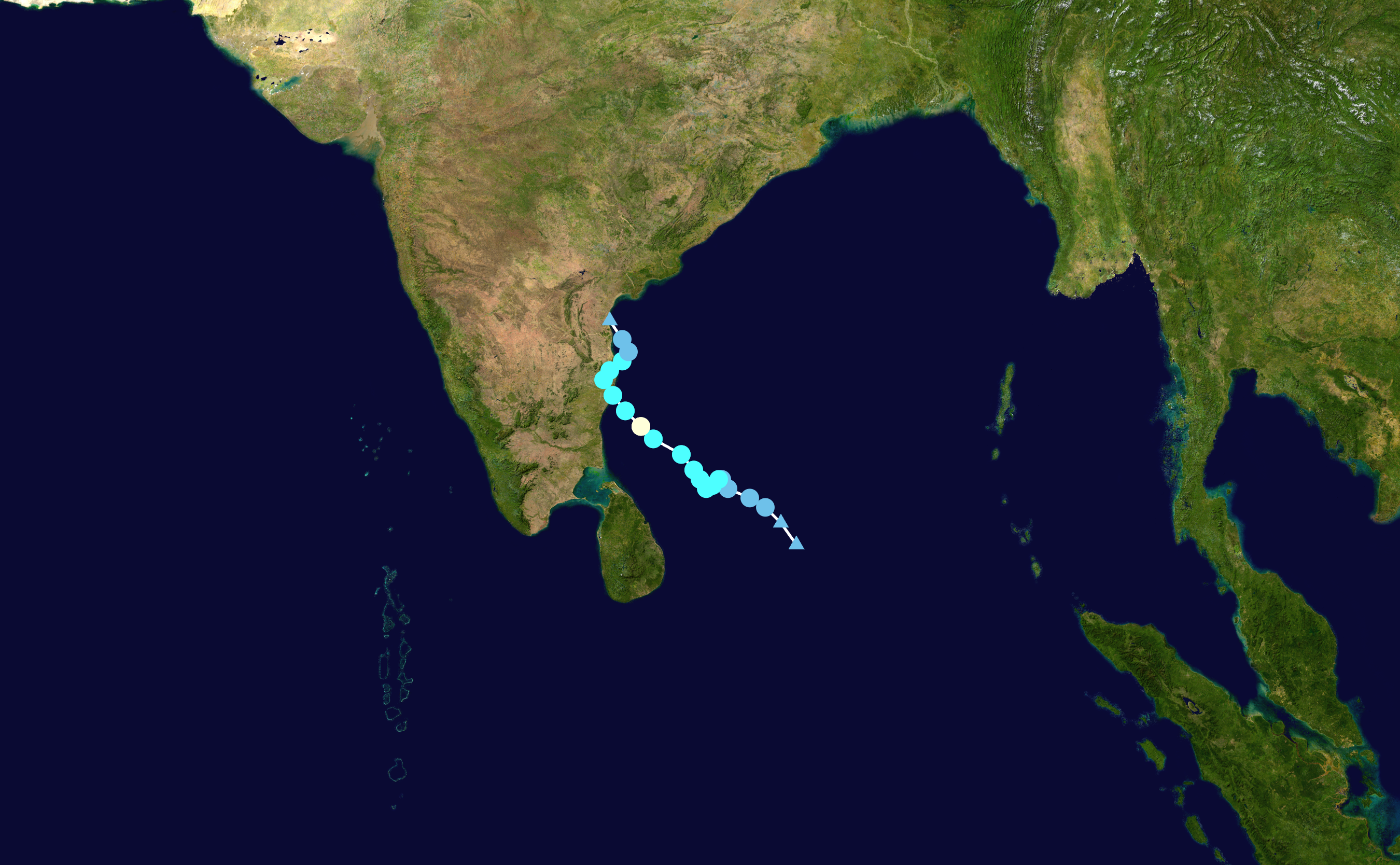
Map plotting the storm's track and intensity, according to the Saffir–Simpson scale Map key Saffir–Simpson scale Tropical depression (≤38 mph, ≤62 km/h) Tropical storm (39–73 mph, 63–118 km/h) Category 1 (74–95 mph, 119–153 km/h) Category 2 (96–110 mph, 154–177 km/h) Category 3 (111–129 mph, 178–208 km/h) Category 4 (130–156 mph, 209–251 km/h) Category 5 (≥157 mph, ≥252 km/h) Unknown Storm type Tropical cyclone Subtropical cyclone Extratropical cyclone, remnant low, tropical disturbance, or monsoon depression

On 22 November, an area of low pressure formed in the Bay of Bengal, off the coast of Tamil Nadu. It intensified into a depression in the early hours of 23 November. In the early hours of 24 November, it further intensified into a cyclonic storm and it was named Nivar. Immediately, the Joint Typhoon Warning Centre gave a TCFA and designated it unofficially as Tropical Cyclone 04B. The IMD issued cyclone warnings off the coast of Tamil Nadu, Pondicherry and Sri Lanka. On 25 November, the cyclone reached its peak intensity of 120 km/h, which classified it as a Very Severe Cyclonic Storm. The JTWC designated it as a category 1 tropical cyclone of 130 km/h. It made a landfall in Marakkanam close to Pondicherry at midnight on 25 November. After that, it gradually weakened into a Deep Depression in the early hours of the 26th and the JTWC issued the final warning on the system at the same time. Afterwards, the system entered back into the Bay of Bengal as a Deep Depression and made its second and final landfall at the Andhra Pradesh coast on the same day. It weakened in the early hours of 27 November at the Rayalaseema region.

== Preparations ==
=== Sri Lanka ===
Red warnings were put in place for northern Sri Lanka, with the threat of heavy rainfall in the region.

=== India ===
On 24 November, six National Disaster Response Force (NDRF) teams have been posted to Cuddalore and two teams will be deployed in Chennai. Tamil Nadu government suspended bus services until further orders in seven districts of Thiruvarur, Nagapattinam, Pudukkottai, Thanjavur, Viluppuram, Chengalpattu and Cuddalore. During a review meeting, Former Chief Minister of Tamil Nadu, K. Palaniswami asked his cabinet members and officials to remain completely vigilant and take necessary precautions ahead of the Cyclone. Officials were also directed to ensure that people in vulnerable areas were evacuated. Measures were taken by the Tamil Nadu government to store dry rations and fuel for the people after the cyclone's impact. The Tamil Nadu government declared a statewide holiday on 25 November. The Tamil Nadu state government reported that more than 100,000 people were evacuated and were sheltered in 1000 relief centers.

The District magistrate of the Nellore district of Andhra Pradesh reported that 3,363 people were sheltered in 115 relief camps.

On 26 November, the IMD issued yellow alert in several parts of Karnataka including Bengaluru.

== Impact ==
=== Sri Lanka ===
Showers and thunderstorms associated with Nivar impacted parts of Sri Lanka as the system moved inland on 26 November.

=== India ===
==== Tamil Nadu ====
The cyclone brought heavy to very heavy rains over north coastal Tamil Nadu starting 23 November 2020. Chennai received continuous downpours on 23,24,25 November 2020 with IMD Chennai recording 163mm ending 25 November 8:30 AM IST. Chennai and other parts of North TN saw gusty winds touching 60-70kmph on 24,25 November. Several roads were closed in the area of the Greater Chennai Corporation were closed due to waterlogging. Due to intense rainfall, Chembarambakkam Lake released water for the first time after five years. Many areas including Madipakkam, Velachery, Adambakkam and suburbs around Tambaram and low-lying regions along the river Adyar were flooded. Rainwater entering houses was also seen in some places in the western suburbs. The Greater Chennai Corporation removed uprooted trees from 223 roads. The estimates of Chennai civic officials reported that flood water entered around 40,000 homes within the borders of the corporation. Five people were reported dead in Tamil Nadu.

==== Puducherry ====
Trees were uprooted, electric poles were damaged and several areas were flooded as of 26 November. The Chief Minister of Puducherry V. Narayanasamy reported that the initial loss in agriculture and other sectors was estimated at ₹4 billion (US$54.2 million).

==== Andhra Pradesh ====
Eight people were reported dead in Andhra Pradesh. The rainfalls made significant impact on the districts of Chittoor, Prakasam, Kadapa and Nellore, 112000 people were affected, 2,294 houses/huts were damaged, 6,133 homes were left stranded, 2,618 small animals, 88 large animals and 8,130 poultry birds were reported dead based on a preliminary evaluation. In Nellore district, Paddy seedlings in 2500 hectares drowned and in Prakasam district, standing crops in 34,000 hectares were damaged. Loss of APSPDCL was amounted to be ₹50.7 million (US$687,000).

== See also ==
- Tropical cyclones in 2020
- 2020 North Indian Ocean cyclone season
- Cyclone Gaja – Another destructive cyclone which hit the similar areas.
- Cyclone Vardah
- Cyclone Thane
- Cyclone Amphan
- Cyclone Burevi
