= Cyclone Steve =

Category 2 Australian region cyclone in 2000

Tropical Cyclone Steve
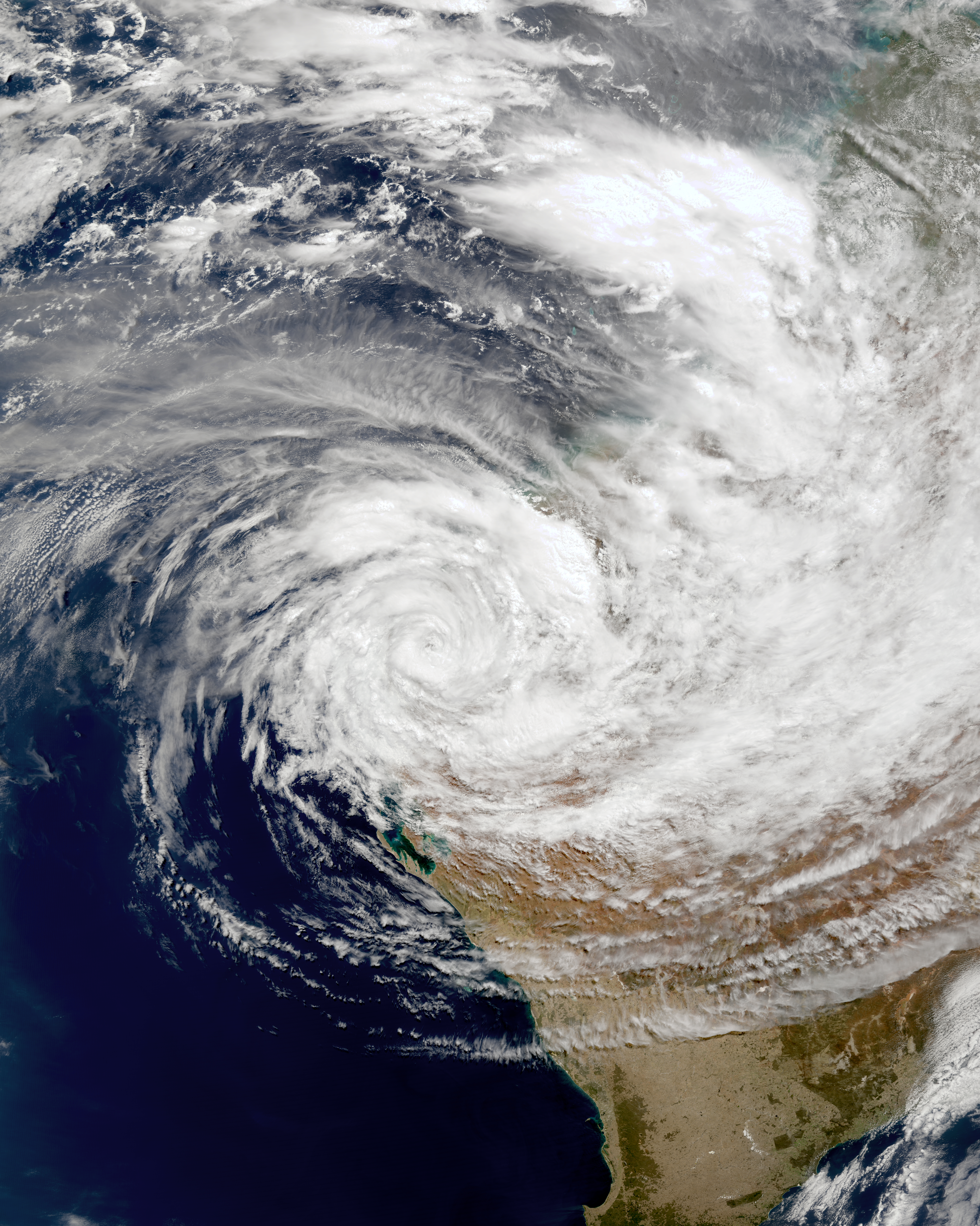
- Steve after peak intensity on 7 March

Meteorological history
- Formed: 27 February 2000
- Extratropical: 11 March 2000
- Dissipated: 11 March 2000

Category 2 tropical cyclone
- 10-minute sustained (Aus)
- Highest winds: 110 km/h (70 mph)
- Lowest pressure: 975 hPa (mbar); 28.79 inHg

Category 1-equivalent tropical cyclone
- 1-minute sustained (SSHWS/JTWC)
- Highest winds: 120 km/h (75 mph)

Overall effects
- Fatalities: None
- Damage: $60.1 million
- Areas affected: Queensland, Northern Territory, Western Australia
- Part of the 1999–2000 Australian region cyclone season

Tropical Cyclone Steve was a tropical cyclone that affected northern Australia from 27 February 2000 until 11 March 2000. Cyclone Steve was noted for its longevity and traversal of northern and western Australia. It impacted on regions of northern Queensland, the Northern Territory and Western Australia before clearing to the south of the continent. Steve is the first known Australian cyclone to make four distinct landfalls in the country.

== Meteorological history ==
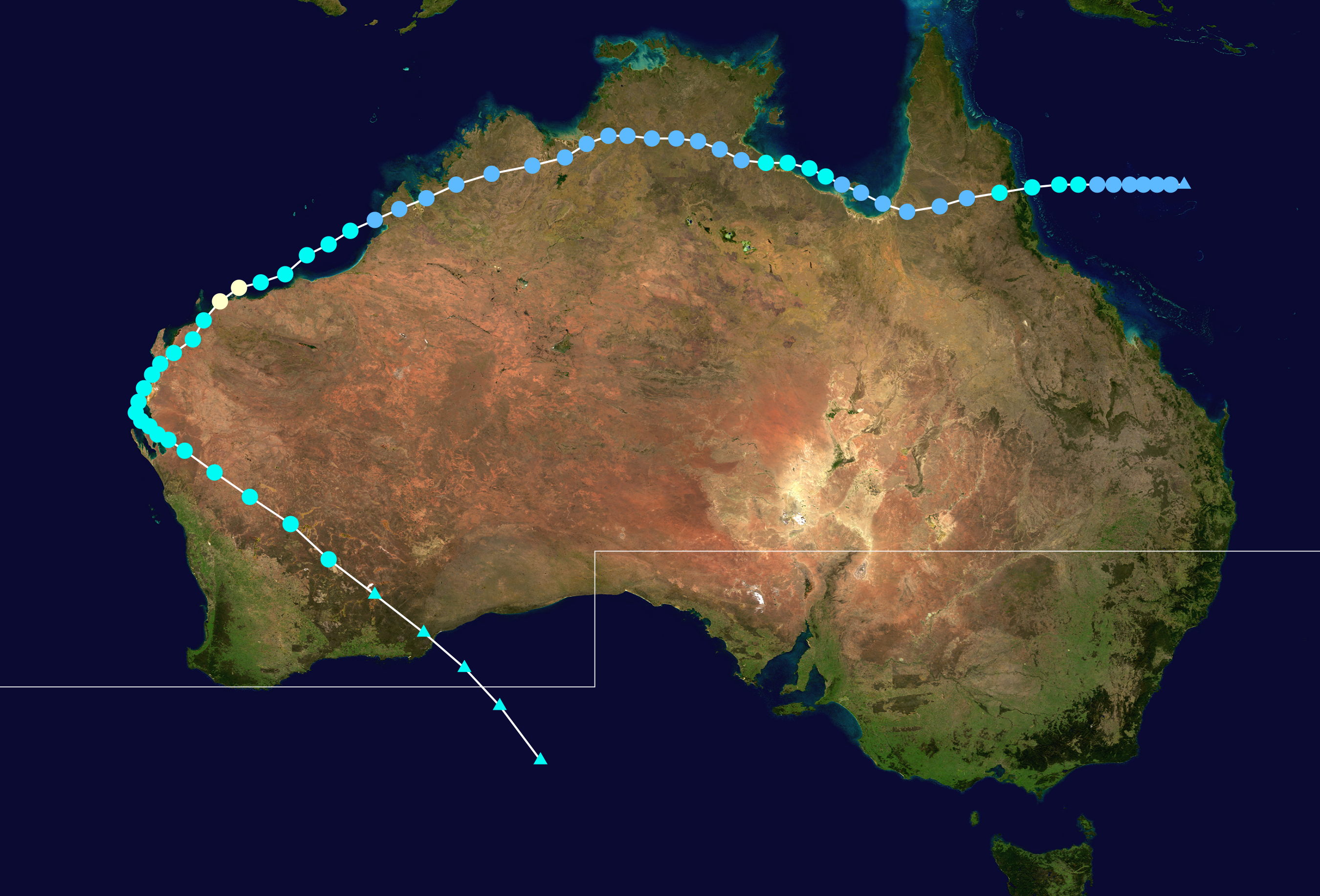
Map plotting the storm's track and intensity, according to the Saffir–Simpson scale Map key Saffir–Simpson scale Tropical depression (≤38 mph, ≤62 km/h) Tropical storm (39–73 mph, 63–118 km/h) Category 1 (74–95 mph, 119–153 km/h) Category 2 (96–110 mph, 154–177 km/h) Category 3 (111–129 mph, 178–208 km/h) Category 4 (130–156 mph, 209–251 km/h) Category 5 (≥157 mph, ≥252 km/h) Unknown Storm type Tropical cyclone Subtropical cyclone Extratropical cyclone, remnant low, tropical disturbance, or monsoon depression

A tropical low formed in the Coral Sea to the east of Willis Island on 25 February 2000. The system rapidly intensified to become Tropical Cyclone Steve at around 7 am Australian Eastern Standard Time (AEST) (UTC+10) on 27 February 2000. The cyclone crossed the Queensland coast as a Category 2 system on 27 February to the north of Cairns at around 7 pm AEST. Steve weakened slowly over land and was downgraded to a tropical low on 28 February.

The low tracked westward and re-intensified to tropical cyclone strength over the Gulf of Carpentaria on the same day at around 10 pm AEST. The cyclone passed over Mornington Island in the southern Gulf of Carpentaria and crossed the Northern Territory coast north of Port McArthur on 1 March as a Category 1. The cyclone weakened back to a tropical low again, but maintained a strong low to middle-level circulation as it crossed the base of the Top End of the Northern Territory. The low moved just south of the Joseph Bonaparte Gulf into the Kimberley region of Western Australia and reformed once again into a tropical cyclone just west of Broome on 5 March at 1 pm Australian Western Standard Time (AWST) (UTC+8).

Cyclone Steve moved in a west southwest direction parallel to the Pilbara coast and strengthened further during the day and was upgraded to a Category 2 system early on 6 March. The cyclone deepened to a pressure of 975 hPa during the day. Continuing on its path to the southwest, Steve passed north of Port Hedland and Karratha on 6 March, before crossing the Pilbara coast near Mardie around midnight on 6 March (Steve's third landfall). The system was again downgraded to Category 1 as it moved inland.

At around midnight on 7 March, Steve again moved offshore about 175 kilometres (109 mi) north of Carnarvon and moved southwards along the coast. However, the system did not intensify further beyond Category 1 and made its final (fourth) landfall at around midnight on 9 March east of Denham. Steve then continued to track to the south-east and increased in speed across southern parts of Western Australia during the 10 and 11 March and becoming extra-tropical, before moving offshore for the final time to the east of Esperance late on 11 March and over the waters of the Great Australian Bight.

== Impact ==
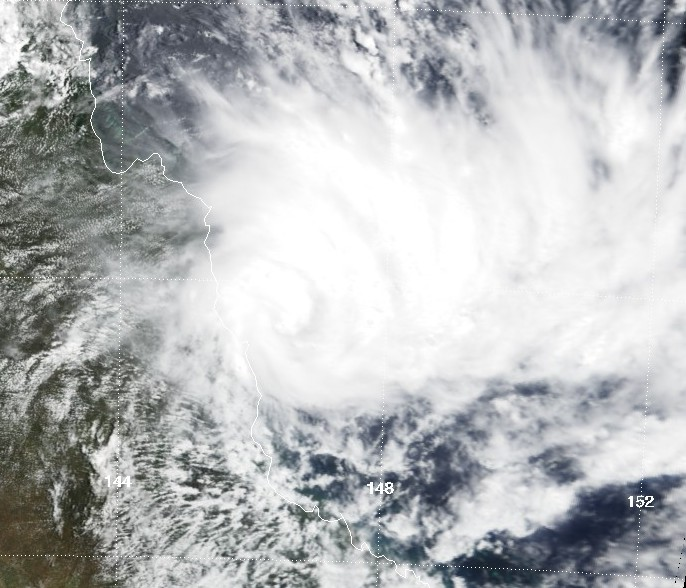
Cyclone Steve made its first landfall on 27 February

=== Queensland ===
As Steve tracked inland on the north Queensland coast, it caused major flooding between Cairns and Mareeba. A record flood level of 12.4 m (41 ft) was reached at Mareeba on 28 February 2000. Many buildings in Cairns suffered severe water damage including the Cairns Hospital. Cairns recorded its wettest February on record with the suburb of Manunda measuring 1,462.7 mm (57.59 in) and Bartle Frere recording 3,376 mm (132.9 in). Wind gusts up to 140 km/h (87 mph) caused several buildings in Cairns and Kuranda to lose their roofs. Hundreds of trees were uprooted and powerlines were brought down throughout the district, disrupting supplies to more than 40,000 residents. In Cairns, a giant fig tree was uprooted with the entire root system out of the ground. Crop damage by floods and winds was severe, with the sugar cane damage alone estimated at A$20 million. Early estimates indicate that the total damage bill in north Queensland associated with Cyclone Steve may exceed A$100 million.

=== Northern Territory ===
Severe winds squalls and heavy rainfall was recorded across the Top End. Several trees were uprooted in Gunbalanya (Oenpelli) which reported winds gusts in excess of 90 km/h (56 mph). Gusts near 90 km/h (56 mph) in Darwin overnight on 2 March brought down trees. Widespread flooding resulted in the Katherine, Daly and Victoria River regions. Water levels in the Katherine River came to within about 3 metres (9.8 feet) of those experienced in the 1998 floods but subsided without inundating the town. Rainfall across the Top End, Victoria River region over a four-day period between 29 February to 4 March was between 200 and 400 millimetres (7.9 and 15.7 inches). Similar totals were recorded over four days in the Kimberley region. Numerous Northern Territory roads and highways were cut with many communities isolated.

=== Western Australia ===
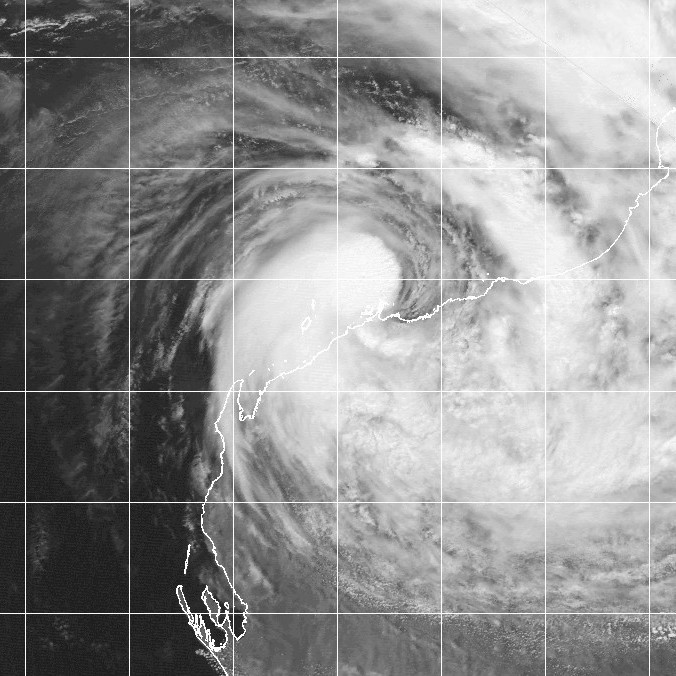
Cyclone Steve near its third landfall on 6 March

Near gale-force winds were experienced at Port Hedland for a period of about 17 hours beginning at midnight AWST on 5 March. The peak hourly average wind speed recorded was 72 km/h (45 mph) and the maximum gust recorded was 104 km/h (65 mph) (between 8 and 9 am AWST 6 March). Winds averaged near 70 km/h (43 mph) at Karratha in the early evening 6 March and the maximum gust recorded was 98 km/h (61 mph) at 6 pm AWST.

The very heavy rainfall associated with Steve produced widespread flooding in northern parts of the state, including the Gascoyne region. Communities in the Kimberley region which remained isolated for more than two weeks required food and supply air-drops. Low-lying areas of the Carnarvon townsite were flooded when the Gascoyne River breached its banks. The Gascoyne River at Carnarvon reached its highest level since 1960.

Parts of the western Pilbara and northern Gascoyne received totals that ranged from 200 to 300 mm. Several sites reported highest on record daily rainfall amounts including Mandora (281.0 mm on 6th) and Mount Narryer (152.0 mm on 10th). Carnarvon (100.6 mm on 9th) reported its highest March daily rainfall since records commenced at the airport in 1945. Rainfall ranging from 50 to 100 mm continued over inland parts extending in a south-easterly direction from the west Gascoyne to the south coast near Esperance. Flooding occurred in the Esperance area and number of roads and bridges were washed away. Salmon Gums Research Station recorded 91 mm of rain on 11 March.

=== Retirement ===
The name Steve was removed from the official list of tropical cyclone names set out by the Tropical Cyclone Warning Centre in Brisbane. It was replaced with the name Stan.

== See also ==
- List of retired Australian region cyclone names
