= Cyclone Connie =

South-West Indian tropical cyclone in 2000

Intense Tropical Cyclone Connie
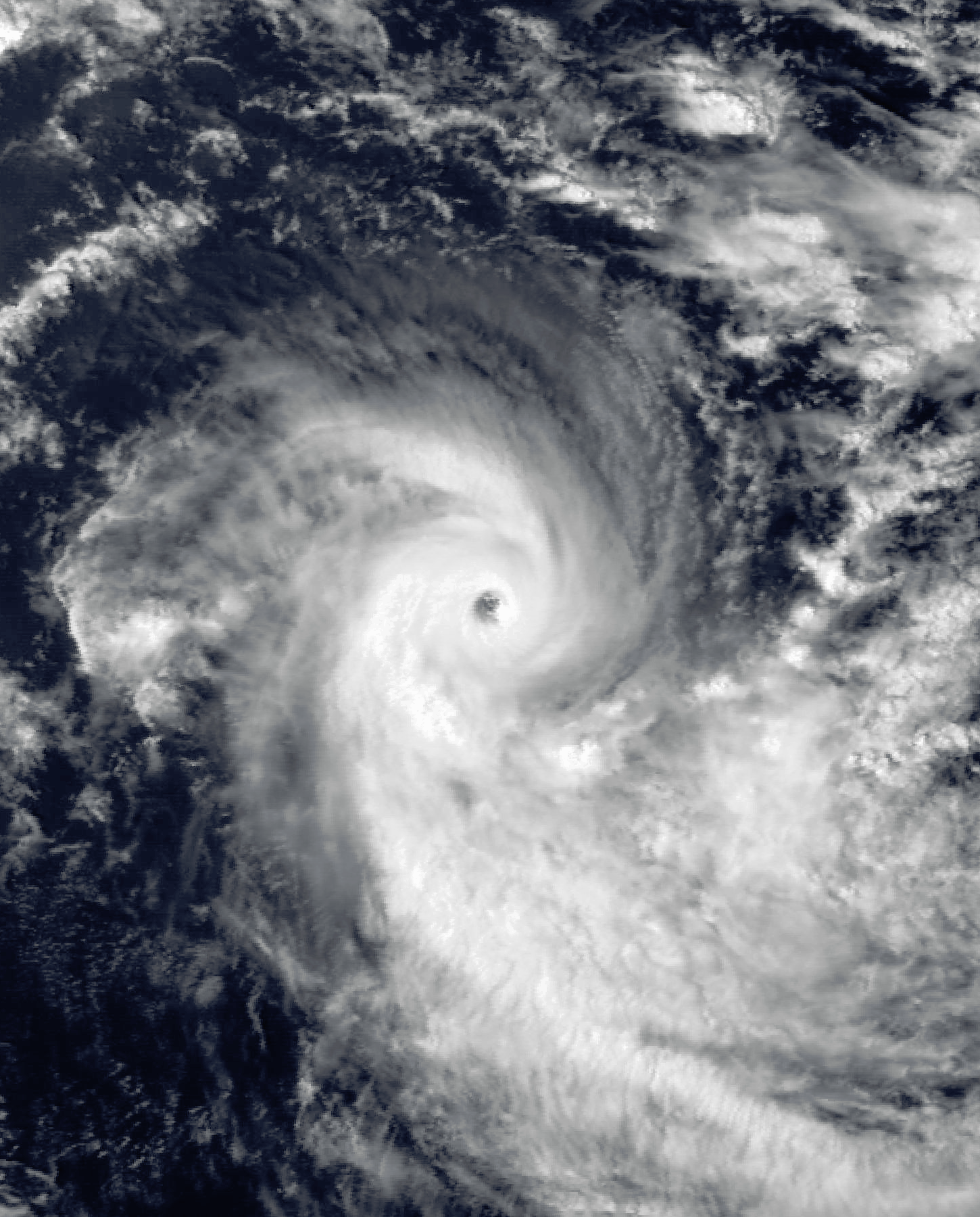
- Cyclone Connie on January 28

Meteorological history
- Formed: January 24, 2000
- Dissipated: February 2, 2000

Intense tropical cyclone
- 10-minute sustained (MFR)
- Highest winds: 185 km/h (115 mph)
- Lowest pressure: 930 hPa (mbar); 27.46 inHg

Category 4-equivalent tropical cyclone
- 1-minute sustained (SSHWS/JTWC)
- Highest winds: 220 km/h (140 mph)

Overall effects
- Fatalities: 3
- Areas affected: Mauritius, Réunion, Mozambique
- IBTrACS
- Part of the 1999–2000 South-West Indian Ocean cyclone season

Intense Tropical Cyclone Connie was a strong tropical cyclone that affected both Mauritius and Réunion in late January 2000. On January 24, 2000, a tropical disturbance developed well east of Madagascar. Despite moderate wind shear, it gradually strengthened while stalling offshore, and late on January 25, was believed to have attained tropical storm status. After turning generally southeast, Connie attained cyclone intensity on January 27. Rapid intensification ensued. Shortly after developing a well-defined eye, Connie attained peak intensity at 0000 UTC on January 28 as an intense tropical cyclone. Thereafter, Connie slowly weakened due to increased wind shear as thunderstorm activity quickly diminished around the eye. After threatening Mauritius, Connie then turned southwest, passing very close to Réunion late on January 28. After briefly leveling off in intensity that evening, Connie soon became less organized, and midday on January 29, the eye became less defined. The next day, Connie weakened to a severe tropical storm. Despite forecasts of additional weakening, Connie maintained its intensity for most of January 31. However, weakening resumed on February 1 and the storm transitioned to an extratropical cyclone on February 2. Two days later, Connie merged with another low-pressure area.

Despite passing well offshore Mauritius, both the airport and the port were closed due to lack of certainty in the storm's path. Connie brought several days of heavy rains and gusty winds to the island. One person was killed there and power was briefly disconnected. Overall, damage on Mauritius was minor. While passing near Reunion, Cyclone Connie brought heavy rains to the island nation. Power was knocked out to around 40,000 individuals. Roughly 100 homes were destroyed, leaving 600 people were homeless. Another 300 sought shelter. Two people were killed, but damage in Reunion was minimal. The extratropical remnants of the system later brought flooding to Mozambique, where 20,000 people were listed as homeless.

== Meteorological history ==
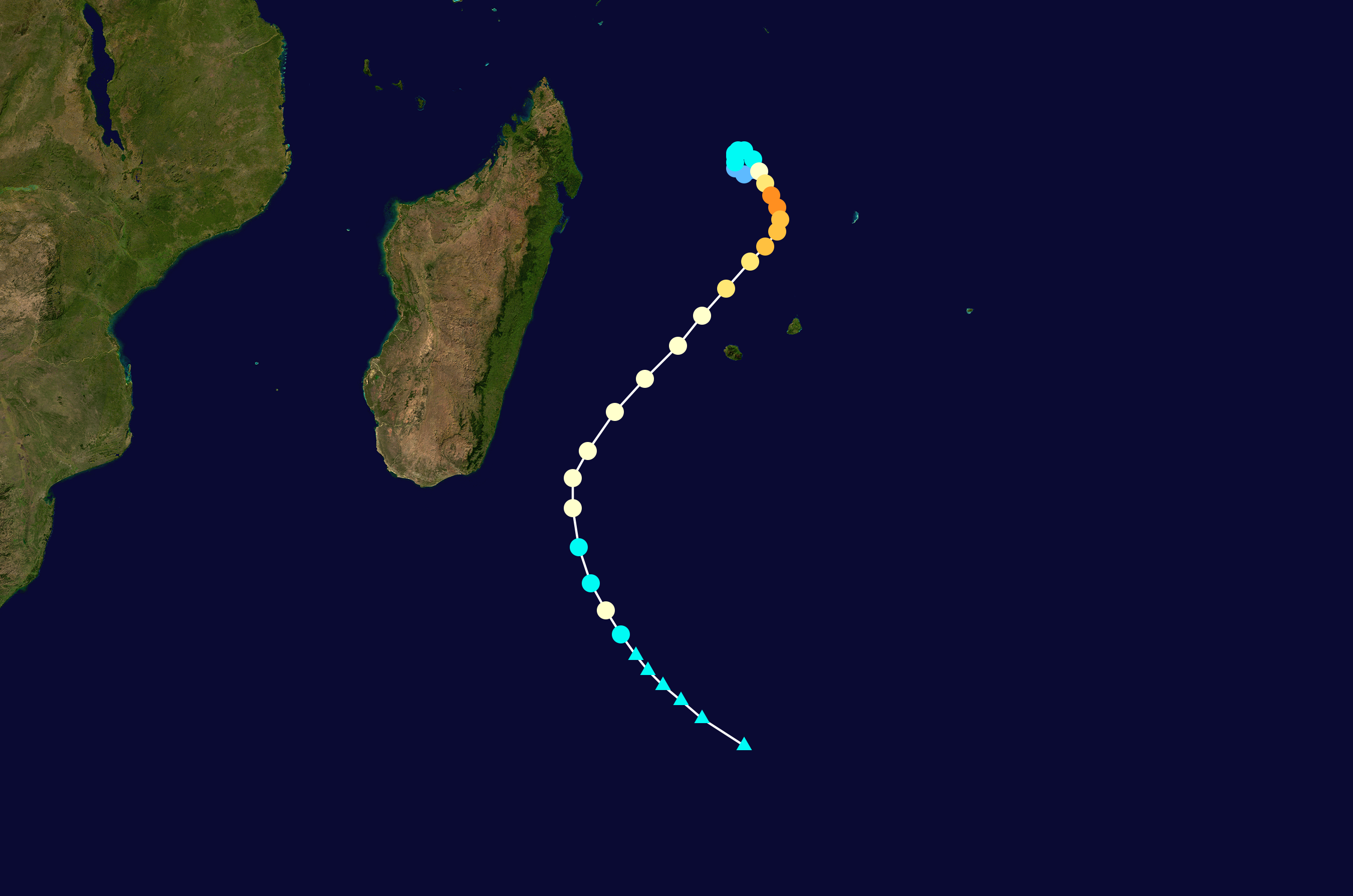
Map plotting the storm's track and intensity, according to the Saffir–Simpson scale Map key Saffir–Simpson scale Tropical depression (≤38 mph, ≤62 km/h) Tropical storm (39–73 mph, 63–118 km/h) Category 1 (74–95 mph, 119–153 km/h) Category 2 (96–110 mph, 154–177 km/h) Category 3 (111–129 mph, 178–208 km/h) Category 4 (130–156 mph, 209–251 km/h) Category 5 (≥157 mph, ≥252 km/h) Unknown Storm type Tropical cyclone Subtropical cyclone Extratropical cyclone, remnant low, tropical disturbance, or monsoon depression

On January 22, an area of disturbed weather developed around 10°S to 15°S, a prime location for tropical cyclone formation within the basin. Although the system gradually became better organized, moderate easterly wind shear prevented significant development. By January 24 this area was located approximately 600 km (375 mi) east of the northern tip of Madagascar. Following a significant increase in organization due to decreased wind shear, the Météo-France office in Reunion (MFR) (Note: The Météo-France office in Réunion is the official Regional Specialized Meteorological Center for the basin.) upgraded the system into Tropical Disturbance 4. At 1100 UTC on January 25, MFR upgraded the disturbance into a tropical depression while the Joint Typhoon Warning Center (JTWC) issued a Tropical Cyclone Formation Alert (TCFA) for the system. At 1800 UTC that day, the MFR upgraded the system into Moderate Tropical Storm Connie while the JTWC also upgraded Connie into a tropical storm. (Note: Wind estimates from MFR and most other basins throughout the world are sustained over 10 minutes, while estimates from the United States-based Joint Typhoon Warning Center are sustained over 1 minute. 10 minute winds are about 1.14 times the amount of 1 minute winds.)

Situated in an environment of favorable wind shear, Connie steadily became better organized. It quickly developed rainbands and good outflow. At first, Connie was nearly stationary but on January 26, moved northeastward under the influence of a subtropical ridge. Tropical Cyclone Connie slowly strengthened, although this process was slowed due to upwelling of cold ocean waters. That morning, the JTWC upgraded Connie to a 120 km/h (75 mph) hurricane. At 0703 UTC, satellite imagery dedicated a 50 km (30 mi) wide eye. Despite the eye feature, MFR assessed the intensity at 80 km/h (50 mph). Early the next day, however, MFR classified Connie as a severe tropical storm following satellite data, which suggested that Connie had developed an 80% closed eyewall. Moving east-southeast, Connie was upgraded to cyclone intensity at noon on January 27. Meanwhile, the JTWC revised the storms intensity to 160 km/h (100 mph), equivalent to a low-end Category 2 hurricane on the Saffir–Simpson hurricane wind scale (SSHWS) roughly 780 km (485 mi) north-northwest of Mauritius.

With an upper-level high located near the cyclone, the tropical cyclone steadily became better organized and thus Connie began to strengthen rapidly, as previously indicated by many tropical cyclone forecast models. The system then began to slowly turn southeast in the general direction of Mauritius and Réunion. By 1800 UTC on January 27, Tropical Cyclone Connie developed a very well defined eye; based on this, MFR upgraded Connie to a very intense tropical cyclone. Around this time, the JTWC raised the intensity of Connie to 215 km/h (135 mph), equal to a borderline Category 4 hurricane on the SSHWS, based on Dvorak intensity estimates of T5.5 and T6.0. After passing around 500 km (310 mi) north-northwest of Mauritius, Connie then decelerated east-southeast. At 0000 UTC on January 28, MFR estimated that Connie attained its peak intensity of 185 km/h (115 mph). Despite this cloud tops associated with Connie began to warm, even though the eye remained well-defined. Thus, the JTWC lowered the intensity of Connie to 190 km/h (120 mph), based on a blend of satellite intensity estimates.

Early on January 28, Connie made its closest approach to St. Brandon and initially appeared to be approaching Mauritius. However, many computer models correctly predicted Connie to turn southwest and threaten Reunion. Throughout the day, Connie maintained its intensity, but by the evening on January 28, thunderstorm activity diminished and the cloud structure became less organized, though the storm maintained a small eye. Increased southerly wind shear from a tropical upper tropospheric trough (TUTT) took toll on the system. During the morning hours of January 29 both agencies reduced the intensity to 145 km/h (90 mph) as the storm began to encounter dry air. By the afternoon, MFR downgraded Connie to tropical cyclone status; the eye had become cloud-filled, although it was still visible on radar. That night, the storm passed 130 km (80 mi) northwest of Reunion. Early on January 30, MFR downgraded Connie to a severe tropical storm. Later that day, the JTWC estimated that Connie lost hurricane-force winds roughly 500 km (310 mi) east of the southern tip of Madagascar; all of the storm's deep convection by this time was displaced to the south.

After moving away from Reunion, Connie accelerated towards the south around a subtropical ridge situated near Amsterdam Island. On January 31, Connie turned southeast, steered about a trough to the southeast. Contrary to forecasts which predicted continued weakening, MFR kept the intensity at 105 km/h (65 mph) for most of January 31. Based on satellite derived intensity estimates, the JTWC briefly re-upgraded Connie to a Category 1 hurricane equivalent on the SSHWS at 1800 UTC. However, the re-strengthening trend was short lived due to increased northwesterly wind shear. Satellite imagery early on February 1 revealed an exposed circulation and a rapid decreased of thunderstorm activity in bothy coverage and intensity. Based on this and the fact that the storm appeared to be losing tropical characteristics, MFR issued its final advisory on Connie. However, the JTWC continued to track Connie until February 2, when it merged with an extratropical low. At the time of dissipation, the JTWC assessed the intensity of Connie at 50 km/h (30 mph).

== Impact ==
Despite large uncertainty in the storm's path, the international airport on the eastern side of Mauritius and all ships within the Port Louis harbor had departed. A cyclone warning was declared and 165 shelters were opened. As a precaution, power was turned off. However, on the afternoon of January 29 all sea and airports were re-opened and power was turned back on as the storm moved away.

While making its closet approach to Mauritius on January 28, Connie brought heavy rains and strong winds to the archipelago. Winds greater than 100 km/h (62 mph) were recorded through much of the island, including a peak of 134 km/h (83 mph) in Médine. During a six-day period from January 26 to January 31, many locations along the eastern portion of the island received 600 mm (25 in), equivalent to approximately a month's worth of rainfall, including a maximum rainfall of 647 mm (25.5 in). These rains helped relieve extreme drought conditions. Offshore, waves up to 7.95 m (26.1 ft) in height were reported. One man perished on his roof while trying to fix his antenna. Two rivers were flooded but all in all, damage was minimal.

Due to its slow motion, Intense Tropical cyclone Connie deluged Reunion with heavy rains for several days before suddenly tampering off on January 29. Throughout the passage of the cyclone, many locations recorded wind gusts in excess of 100 km/h (62 mph), highlighted by 133 km/h (83 mph) in Le Port, 155 km/h (95 mph) in Peite France, and 216 km/h (134 mph) in Maida. Moreover, a peak rainfall total of 1,752 mm (69.0 in) was measured in Commerson, 1,296 mm (51.0 in) of which occurred in a 24-hour time frame. Many roads across Reunion were damaged. Power was knocked out to 40,000 customers while more than 100 homes were demolished. Two persons were killed, including a young man that fell while trying to observe the cyclone. A total of 600 people were reported homeless; roughly 300 people were evacuated. Although the agriculture sector suffered the most significant damages, overall, damage was minor. However, the French government later provided relief aid to Reunion as a result of the damage.

The non-tropical remnants of Connie brought flooding to Southern Africa for several days. In Maputo, 328 mm (12.9 in) of rain fell within a day. Large sections of many neighborhoods were inundated. Roughly 20,000 people were rendered homeless. The road that linked Maputo to South Africa was cut. The Ministry of Education was forced to delay the start of the school year. Following the floods, roughly 20 emergency shelters were opened. These rains help set the stage for additional flooding caused by Cyclone Leon–Eline and Cyclone Hudah.

== See also ==
- Tropical cyclones in 2000
- Tropical cyclones in the Mascarene Islands
- Cyclone Dina (2002) – a tropical cyclone which had a similar track to Connie.
