= Cyclone Sam =

Category 5 Australian region cyclone in 2000

Severe Tropical Cyclone Sam
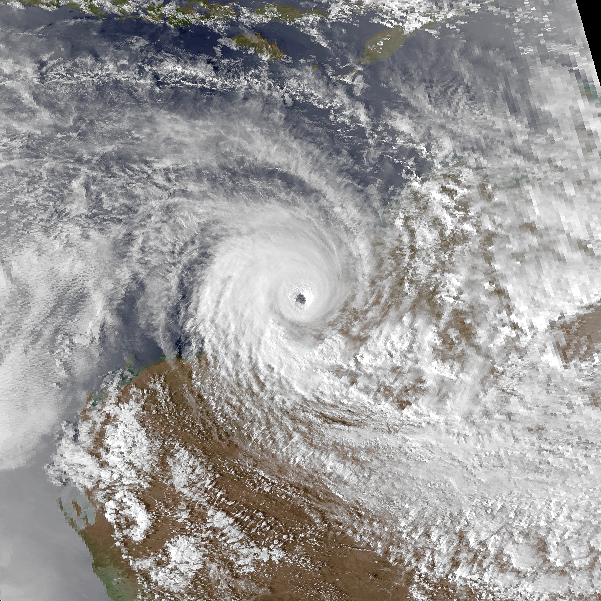
- Cyclone Sam making landfall on Australia at peak intensity on 8 December

Meteorological history
- Formed: 28 November 2000
- Dissipated: 14 December 2000

Category 5 severe tropical cyclone
- 10-minute sustained (BOM)
- Highest winds: 205 km/h (125 mph)
- Highest gusts: 280 km/h (175 mph)
- Lowest pressure: 935 hPa (mbar); 27.61 inHg

Category 3-equivalent tropical cyclone
- 1-minute sustained (SSHWS/JTWC)
- Highest winds: 205 km/h (125 mph)

Overall effects
- Fatalities: None
- Areas affected: Western Australia
- IBTrACS
- Part of the 2000–01 Australian region cyclone season

Severe Tropical Cyclone Sam (JTWC designation: 03S) was an intense tropical cyclone that brought flooding rainfall to a wide swath of northern Australia in December 2000. The first tropical cyclone of the regional season, Sam originated from a tropical low that formed in the Arafura Sea on 28 November. Tracking generally westward, the initial low-pressure area remained generally weak until it entered the Timor Sea, by which time it had strengthened into a tropical cyclone on 5 December. Though a subtropical ridge was forcing the cyclone westward at the time, an approaching shortwave trough caused Sam to track southward the following day, towards the Australian coast. During its southward progression, Sam rapidly intensified, and reached its peak intensity on 8 December. Soon afterwards, the storm made landfall near Lagrange, Western Australia at the same intensity. Once inland, Sam was slow to weaken as it re-curved eastward, and persisted for nearly a week inland before dissipating on 14 December.

Throughout its existence, Cyclone Sam brought heavy rainfall to a wide swath of northern Australia. Rainfall peaked at 520 mm (20 in) in Shelamar over a 48-hour period ending on 11 December. Upon making landfall, damage was considerable, albeit localized. Most of the destruction wrought by Sam occurred near the coast, particularly in Bidyadanga and Anna Springs Station. Some buildings sustained considerable damage, and trees and power lines were felled, resulting in some power outages. Offshore, 163 illegal immigrants aboard two vessels were feared to have drowned, which would make Sam one of the deadliest cyclones in Australian history. However, these people were later accounted for. After the season, the name Sam was retired from the regional naming list.

== Meteorological history ==
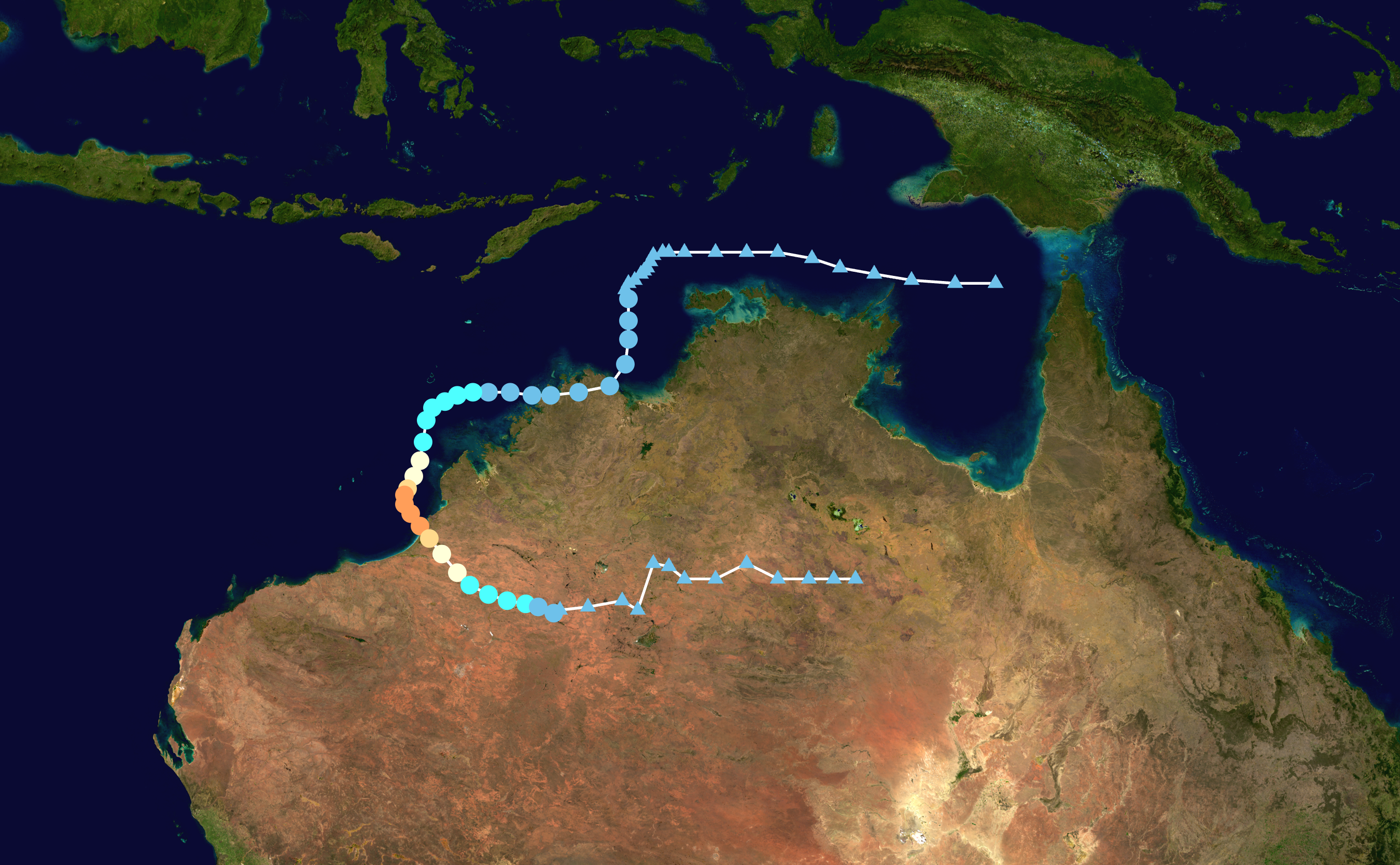
Map plotting the storm's track and intensity, according to the Saffir–Simpson scale Map key Saffir–Simpson scale Tropical depression (≤38 mph, ≤62 km/h) Tropical storm (39–73 mph, 63–118 km/h) Category 1 (74–95 mph, 119–153 km/h) Category 2 (96–110 mph, 154–177 km/h) Category 3 (111–129 mph, 178–208 km/h) Category 4 (130–156 mph, 209–251 km/h) Category 5 (≥157 mph, ≥252 km/h) Unknown Storm type Tropical cyclone Subtropical cyclone Extratropical cyclone, remnant low, tropical disturbance, or monsoon depression

During an active Madden–Julian oscillatory period over Australian longitudes in late November, a broad low-pressure area developed within the monsoon trough in the southeastern Arafura Sea, west of Cape York Peninsula. Due to its potential for development, the Bureau of Meteorology Tropical Cyclone Warning Center in Darwin (TCWC Darwin) began monitoring the system on 28 November. Tracking westward, the low eventually moved into the Timor Sea three days later and became quasi-stationary in forward motion. Situated within a good outflow environment, the Joint Typhoon Warning Center (JTWC) began monitoring the disturbance at 0300 UTC on 1 December, assessing it with a 'poor' likelihood of cyclogenesis; these probabilities as assessed by the JTWC would increase up until eventual formation. Nonetheless, TCWC Darwin began issuing tropical-related products on the disturbance beginning at 0730 UTC the following day. At 0000 UTC on 3 December, the JTWC analyzed that the tropical low had organized into a tropical depression. Due to weak steering currents, the depression drifted southward and moved ashore the Kimberley coast roughly 90 km (55 mi) east of Kalumbaru; this stint over land was short lived, however, and the system tracked back westward, reentering the warm Timor Sea the following day. Positioned within favorable conditions under a subtropical ridge, the depression began to strengthen. At 0400 UTC on 5 December, TCWC Perth, having assumed local area responsibilities for the tracking of the storm, determined the system to have strengthened into a tropical cyclone. As such, the warning center assigned the name Sam to the storm. Although a tropical cyclone warning was issued twelve hours prior, the JTWC followed suit by classifying Sam as a tropical storm at 1200 UTC the same day.

Upon tropical cyclogenesis on 5 December, the surrounding atmospheric conditions were generally favorable for continued development; however, a northeasterly wind flow generated wind shear, somewhat inhibiting development and partially exposing Sam's low level center of circulation as it tracked westward. Over the following two days, however, the tropical cyclone's rainbands were able to fully enclose the center of circulation. During the evening hours of 6 December, however, Sam began to interact with a shortwave trough, causing the cyclone to curve southward and towards the northwestern coast of Australia. Over the following day, an eye started to form and Sam began to rapidly intensify. At 0400 UTC, the storm attained Category 3 cyclone intensity on the Bureau of Meteorology cyclone scale. Ten hours later, Category 4 intensity was achieved. At the time, Sam had featured an eye measuring 30 mi (48 km) in diameter. Objective Dvorak intensity analysis gave the system a rating of 7.7, corresponding to an estimated intensity of 215 km/h (134 mph). (Note: All wind measurements are sustained for ten minutes, unless otherwise noted.) Around the same time, Sam briefly became stationary before resuming its southward trek. Continuing to intensify, TCWC Perth upgraded the cyclone to Category 5 intensity at 2000 UTC, with winds of 195 km/h (121 mph) and a minimum pressure of 950 hPa (mbar; 28.06 inHg). However, in post-storm analysis, it was analyzed that Sam had had in fact peaked with winds of 205 km/h (127 mph) and a minimum pressure of 935 hPa (mbar; 27.61 inHg). The JTWC rated the storm as a Category 3 hurricane on the Saffir–Simpson hurricane wind scale. At the same intensity, Sam made landfall near Lagrange, Western Australia at 1300 UTC on 8 December. Upon moving ashore, Sam began to slowly weaken over the Great Sandy Desert. On 9 December, the JTWC ceased the monitoring of the system, as the weakened Sam began to curve eastward. After a brief period of restrengthening over central Australia on 13 December, Sam finally weakened below tropical cyclone intensity the following day before dissipating shortly thereafter.

== Preparations and impact ==
As a precursor low-pressure area, Sam brought widespread rainfall throughout a wide swath of northern Australia. Due to its proximity to the coast throughout its existence, associated rainfall continued to affect the region throughout Sam's existence. As Sam approached the coast, numerous warnings were issued, with storm warnings posted for Cape Leveque to Pardoo Station on 8 December. Meteorologists indicated that the storm would be a threat to shipping in the immediate regions. Due to the storm's impending threat to the northwestern coast of Australia, most of the residents of Bidyadanga and Anna Springs Station were evacuated via helicopter. Upon landfall, though severe damage was wrought, damage was localized. The lowest barometric pressure recorded was a measurement of 973 mbar (973 hPa; 28.7 inHg). Some buildings were severely damaged, and trees, power lines, sheds, and fences were downed by the strong winds. Staff quarters and sheds in the Anna Plains Station were demolished. The cattle station also lost electrical power during the storm.

Roughly 600 mi (970 km) off the coast of western Australia, two illegal immigration vessels departing from Indonesia and bound for the Ashmore Islands was caught within Cyclone Sam. As a result, the two ships, in total carrying 167 illegal immigrants, sank. A nearby Japanese tanker was only able to rescue four survivors, and as such, the 163 others were assumed dead. However, the stricken passengers were later found in Indonesia. Five Britons aboard a ketch sailing from London to Sydney were shipwrecked by the storm on 6 December; the ketch was later refueled and repaired by HMAS Launceston. Heavy rainfall caused by Sam resulted in flooding further inland. A weather station in Shelamar near the point of landfall recorded 520 mm (20 in) of precipitation in a 48-hour period ending during the morning hours of 11 December. However, this was likely only a 24-hour measurement due to a lack of human observation as a result of area evacuations.

=== Retirement ===
Due to the destruction wrought by Sam, the name was retired after the season. This made it the 34th tropical cyclone within the area of responsibility of TCWC Perth to have its name retired.

== See also ==
- Tropical cyclones in 2000
- Cyclone Annette (1994) – Strong tropical cyclone that caused heavy cattle losses in Western Australia
- Cyclone Chris (2002) – One of the strongest tropical cyclones to impact Western Australia
- Cyclone Fay (2004) – Late-season tropical cyclone that brought record rainfall to Western Australia
