= Tropical cyclones in 2000 =

Year boundaries
- First system: Babiola
- Formed: January 3, 2000
- Last system: Ando
- Dissipated: January 9, 2001

Strongest system
- Name: Hudah
- Lowest pressure: 905 mbar (hPa); 26.72 inHg

Longest lasting system
- Name: Leon–Eline (third longest lasting tropical system on record)
- Duration: 28 days

Year statistics
- Total systems: 140
- Named systems: 81
- Total fatalities: 1,875
- Total damage: $15.495 billion (2000 USD)
Related articles
- 2000 Atlantic hurricane season
- 2000 Pacific hurricane season
- 2000 Pacific typhoon season
- 2000 North Indian Ocean cyclone season
- 1999–2000 South-West Indian Ocean cyclone season
- 2000–01 South-West Indian Ocean cyclone season
- 1999–2000 Australian region cyclone season
- 2000–01 Australian region cyclone season
- 1999–2000 South Pacific cyclone season
- 2000–01 South Pacific cyclone season

Hurricane Isaac (top) and Hurricane Joyce (bottom) on September 27

During 2000, 140 tropical or subtropical cyclones formed throughout the world. The cyclones originated in seven different areas called basins, where respective weather agencies named 81 storms when they attained maximum sustained winds of 65 km/h (40 mph). The strongest storm of the year was Cyclone Hudah in the south-west Indian Ocean, which attained a minimum pressure of 905 hPa (26.72 inHg), and 10-minute maximum sustained winds of 220 km/h (135 mph). Cyclone Paul tied Hudah's peak winds in the Australian basin.

The cyclones in 2000 produced significant impacts in parts of Africa, Asia, Oceania, and North America. In the western Pacific Ocean, floods produced by Typhoon Kai-tak and a nearby tropical depression led to the Payatas landslide that killed 218 people. In southeastern Africa, Cyclone Eline struck Madagascar and Mozambique after a period of above-normal rainfall, and the ensuing floods killed at least 700 people. (Note: In Madagascar, Eline killed at least 64 people, although subsequent Tropical Storm Gloria affected the same region just two weeks later. The death toll for both storms is 205, with 66 confirmed fatalities related to Gloria, resulting in 139 deaths potentially related to Eline. There were only 17 confirmed fatalities in Mozambique, although the death toll from the cyclone and preceding floods was around 700, with 150 deaths before Eline's arrival. Therefore, there are up to 550 deaths related to the storm in that country. Elsewhere, Eline killed 12 people in Zimbabwe and 21 in South Africa.) The costliest storm was Saomai, which caused $6.3 billion in damage. The accumulated cyclone energy (ACE) index for the year 2000 (seven basins combined), as calculated by Colorado State University was 677.3 units.

There was an above-average number of storms during the year; the most active basin of the year was the Western Pacific, where a below-average 23 named storms formed. The Eastern Pacific and the North Atlantic were both relatively above-average, with 19 named storms forming in the Eastern Pacific and 15 in the North Atlantic. The Southern Hemisphere was also relatively average. Three Category 5 tropical cyclones were formed in 2000.

== Global atmospheric and hydrological conditions ==
As the year began, a strong La Niña was peaking, with temperature anomalies going below −1.5 °C (−2.7 °F). NOAA's May hurricane outlook indicated that overall global conditions were conducive to increased activity in the North Atlantic basin. The La Niña began to weaken towards the latter part of 2000, with signs of weakening occurring as early as May. Astride crossed over from the previous year, dissipating on January 3.

== Summary ==
=== North Atlantic Ocean ===
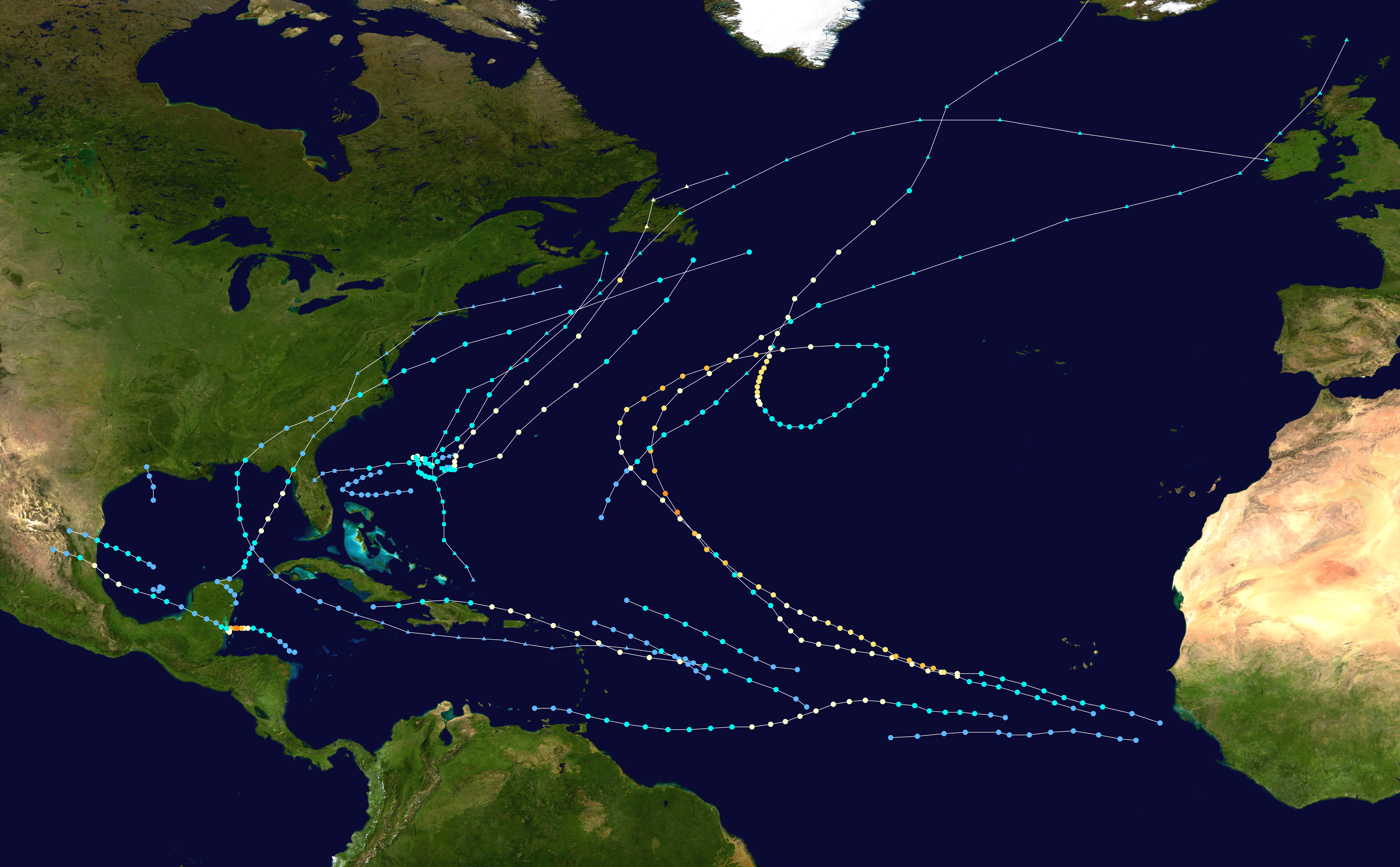
2000 Atlantic hurricane season summary map

An average Atlantic hurricane season features 12 tropical storms, 6 hurricanes, and 3 major hurricanes, and features an Accumulated Cyclone Energy (ACE) count of 106. In 2000 in the North Atlantic basin, there were above-average numbers of named storms and hurricanes and an average number of major hurricanes. 2000 had an ACE count of 119, slightly higher than the average.

The season began with tropical depressions One and Two, both of which formed in June and affected no landmasses. Hurricane Alberto was the first named system of the 2000 season, intensifying into and peaking as a Category 3 hurricane. Alberto was the longest-lived storm of the 2000 Atlantic hurricane season. Four formed east of Florida, though it was not able to strengthen further and dissipated on August 11. Tropical Storm Beryl, Tropical Storm Chris, and Hurricane Debby all formed within a week of each other, with Beryl causing minimal damages in Mexico and Debby causing flooding throughout the Antilles. Tropical Storm Ernesto formed in the Main Development Region (MDR) and affected no landmasses, with Nine forming a week later in the Gulf of Mexico and making landfall on Sabine Pass. Hurricane Florence formed on September 10 and caused rip currents throughout the East Coast of the United States. Hurricane Gordon and Tropical Storm Helene formed on September 14 and 15 respectively, with both storms affecting the Gulf Coast and the East Coast. Hurricane Isaac was the second major hurricane of the season, peaking as a Category 4 hurricane and staying out to sea for most of its life. Hurricane Joyce peaked as a high-end Category 1 hurricane, with damage being limited to the Lesser Antilles. Hurricane Keith was the strongest storm of the season, forming on September 28. Keith rapidly intensified offshore of Belize, peaking as a Category 4 hurricane before weakening and making landfall. Keith caused $319 million in damage and caused 68 fatalities. Tropical Storm Leslie was a relatively weak and short-lived system, though its precursor caused $950 million in damages. Hurricane Michael formed on October 15 and transitioned to an extratropical cyclone just before making landfall in Newfoundland, causing moderate damage in the areas it affected. Tropical Storm Nadine formed days later, affecting no landmasses. The final system, an unnamed subtropical storm, formed on October 25 and affected New England and Atlantic Canada.

The season was not very destructive, causing a total of $1.296 billion in damage, most of which can be attributed to Hurricane Keith and Tropical Storm Leslie. Additionally, 105 people were killed, of which nearly two-thirds can be attributed to Hurricane Keith. The main reason for the lack of damage can be attributed to the lack of landfalling storms and the minimal impact from most of the storms that made landfall.

=== Eastern & Central Pacific Ocean ===
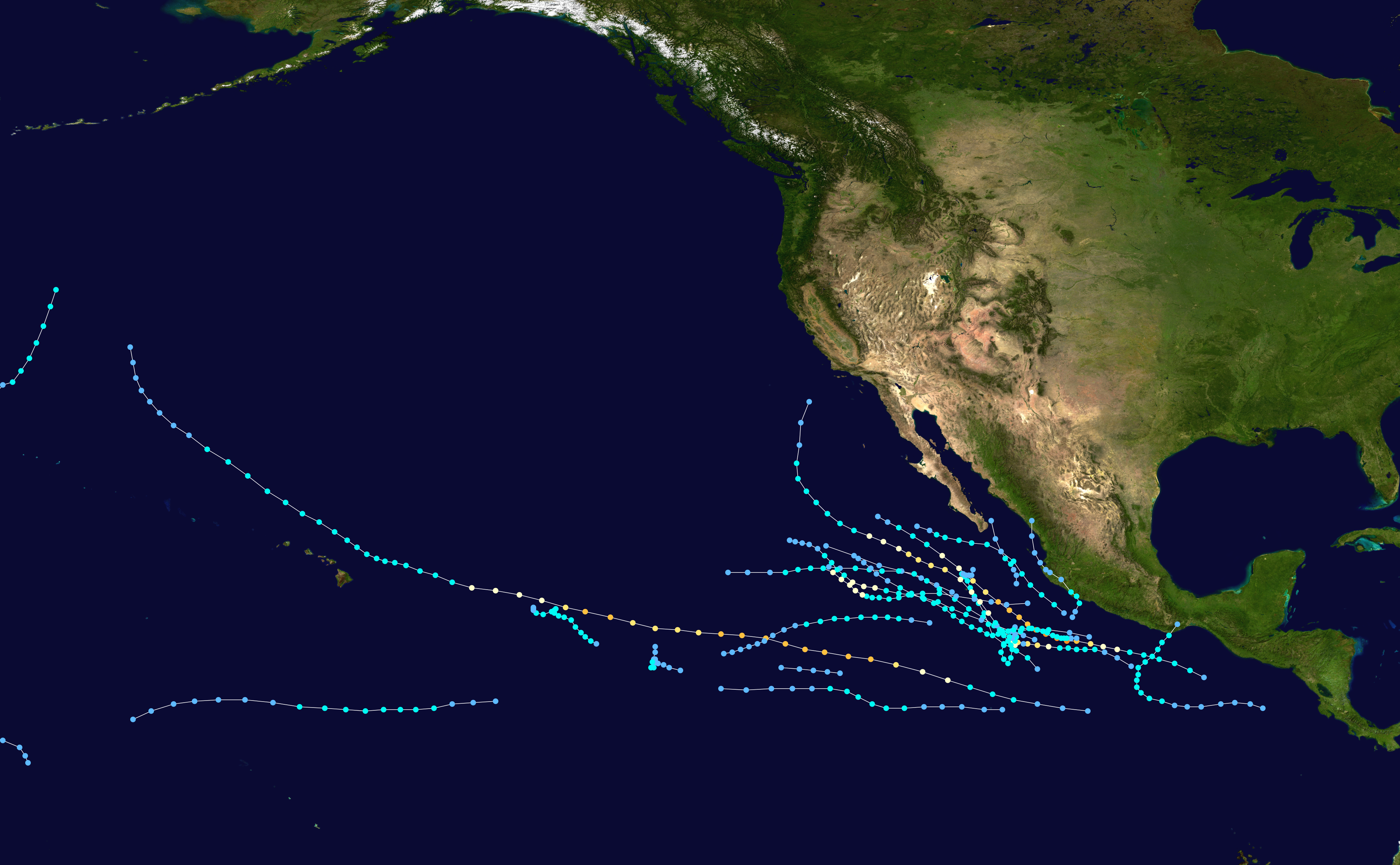
2000 Pacific hurricane season summary map

An average Pacific hurricane season features 15 tropical storms, 9 hurricanes, and 4 major hurricanes, and features an Accumulated Cyclone Energy (ACE) count of 132. In 2000, there were a below-average number of hurricanes and major hurricanes, though there was an above-average number of named storms. As a whole, the season was below-average, having a total of 95 ACE and featuring 19 tropical storms, 6 hurricanes, and 2 major hurricanes. A majority of the storms were weak and short-lived.

The first storm, Hurricane Aletta, formed on May 22 and peaked as a Category 2 hurricane. Tropical Storm Bud was a relatively weak tropical storm, affecting portions of Mexico. Hurricane Carlotta was the strongest storm of the month, peaking as a high-end Category 4 hurricane. Carlotta caused 18 fatalities after sinking a Lithuanian freighter. Following Carlotta, Four-E, Tropical Storm Upana, and Five-E formed in July, all 3 of which were weak and short-lived.

== Systems ==
=== January ===
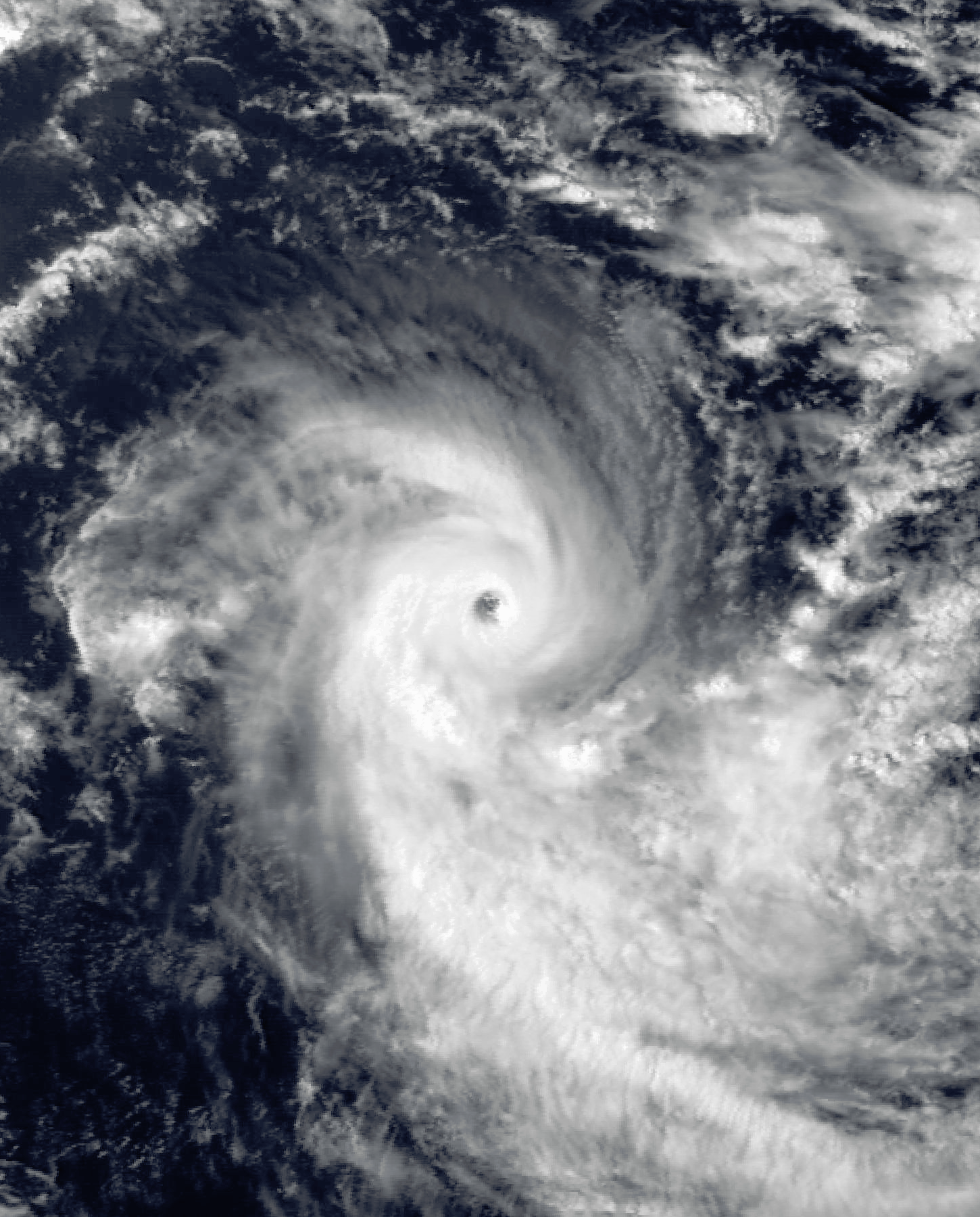
Cyclone Connie

10 storms formed in the month of January, of which 6 were named by their respective agencies. Babiola was the first storm of the season, intensifying into one of the 4 storms that attained hurricane-force winds. Iris was an unusually small tropical cyclone, weakening while passing through Vanuatu. Connie was the strongest storm of the month, becoming an intense tropical cyclone and causing 3 fatalities.

Tropical cyclones formed in January 2000
Storm name	Dates active	Max wind km/h (mph)	Pressure (hPa)	Areas affected	Damage (USD)	Deaths	Refs
Babiola	January 3–12	155 (100)	950	Île Amsterdam	None	None	
06F	January 3–6	45 (30)	1004	None	None	None	
Iris	January 6–10	150 (90)	964	Vanuatu, Fiji	None	None	
03	January 12–26	Not specified	Unknown	Madagascar	Unknown	Unknown	
07F	January 16–16	Not specified	Not specified	None	None	None	
08F	January 20–26	75 (45)	996	None	None	None	
Jo	January 23–27	120 (75)	972	None	None	None	
Kirrily	January 24–February 2	140 (85)	975	None	None	None	
Connie	January 25–February 1	185 (115)	930	Mauritius, Réunion, Southern Africa	Unknown	3	
Damienne	January 30–February 7	65 (40)	994	None	None	None	

=== February ===
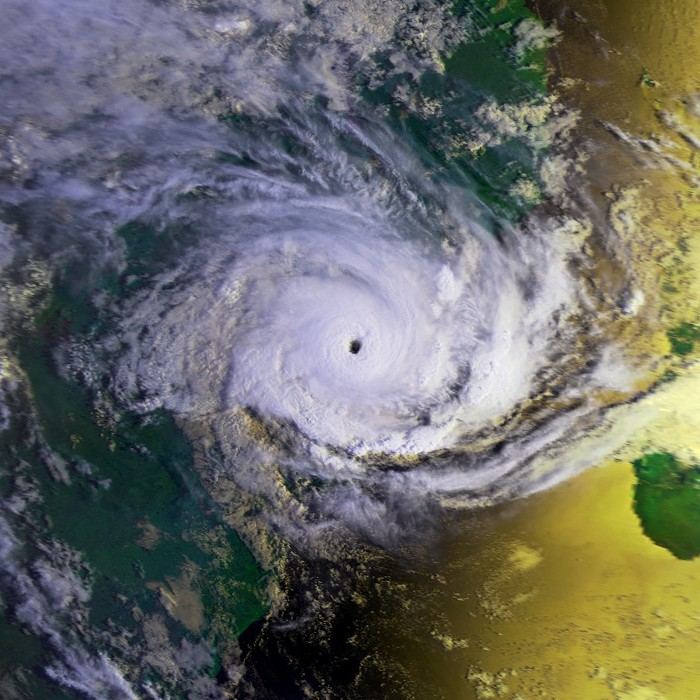
Cyclone Leon–Eline

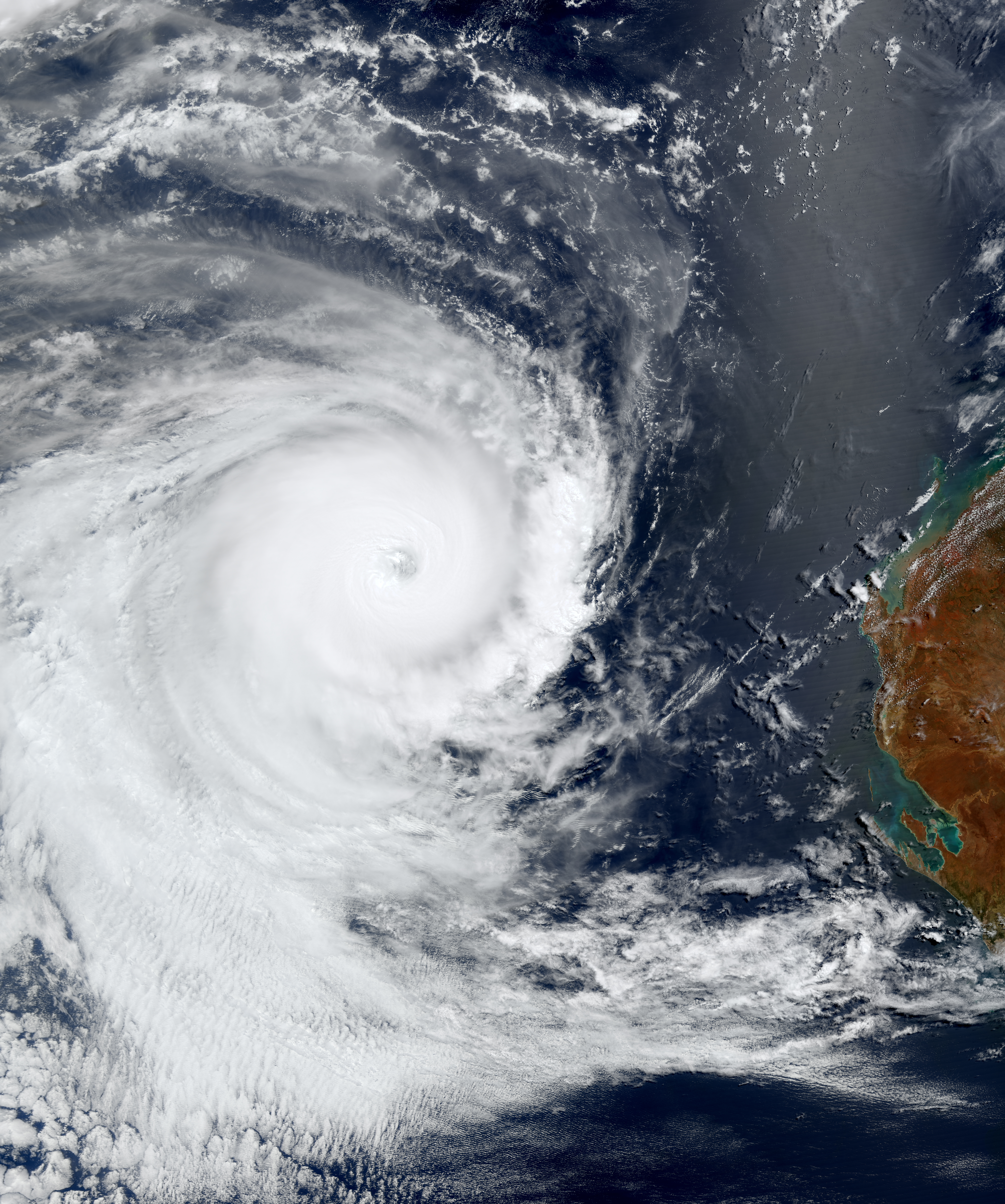
Cyclone Norman

February saw the formation of 10 systems, of which 7 were named. Leon–Eline, the first storm of the month, was the longest-lasting Indian Ocean tropical cyclone, causing significant damages in Madagascar and much of Southern Africa. Leon–Eline was tied for strongest storm of the month with Cyclone Norman. Gloria made landfall on Madagascar weeks after Leon–Eline made landfall, contributing to the early 2000 Madagascar floods. Steve traversed the northern and western coasts of Australia, making 4 landfalls in the process.

Tropical cyclones formed in February 2000
Storm name	Dates active	Max wind km/h (mph)	Pressure (hPa)	Areas affected	Damage (USD)	Deaths	Refs
Leon–Eline	February 1–29	185 (115)	930	Mauritius, Réunion, Rodrigues, Madagascar, Mozambique, South Africa, Swaziland, Malawi, Botswana, Namibia	>$309 million	114-722	
TD	February 7–8	Not specified	1004	Mariana Islands	None	None	
Marcia	February 14–18	65 (40)	995	None	None	None	
Felicia	February 18–24	110 (70)	975	None	None	None	
Kim	February 23–29	165 (105)	935	French Polynesia	Minimal	None	
Gloria	February 27–March 10	95 (60)	985	St. Brandon, Tromelin Island, Madagascar, Mozambique	Unknown	66	(Note: Gloria killed at least 66 people, although the exact toll was initially unknown due to disrupted communications.)
Steve	February 27–March 11	110 (70)	975	North Queensland, Northern Territory, Western Australia	$100 million	None	
13F	February 28–29	65 (40)	994	None	None	None	
Norman	February 29–March 9	185 (115)	930	Western Australia	None	None	
09	February 29–March 11	Not specified	Unknown	None	None	None	

=== March ===
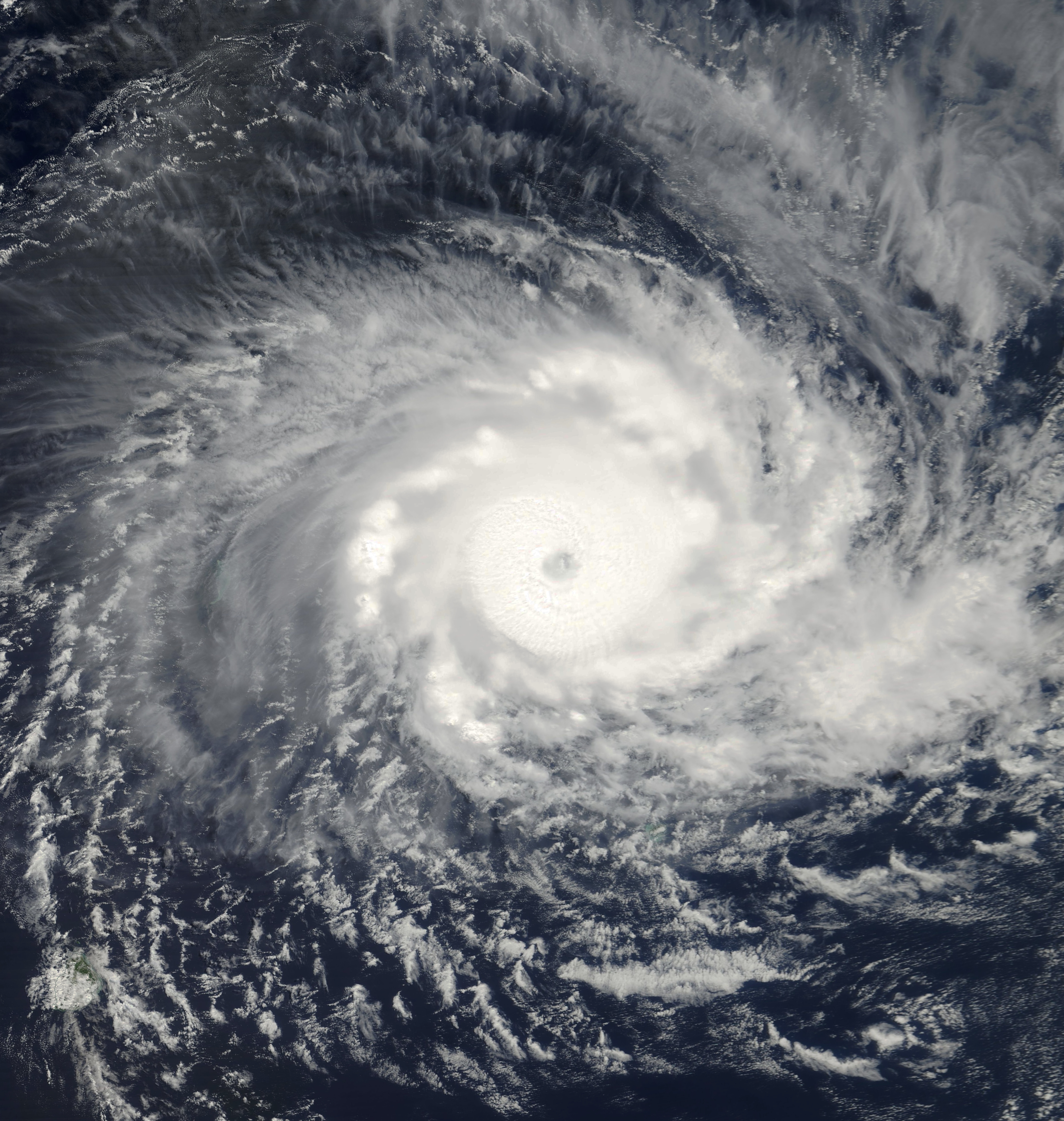
Cyclone Hudah

Tropical cyclones formed in March 2000
Storm name	Dates active	Max wind km/h (mph)	Pressure (hPa)	Areas affected	Damage (USD)	Deaths	Refs
10	March 1–3	Not specified	Unknown	None	None	None	
Leo	March 4–8	95 (60)	985	French Polynesia	Minimal	None	
Mona	March 6–11	140 (85)	960	French Polynesia	Minimal	None	
16F	March 9–12	Not specified	Not specified	None	None	None	
11	March 10	Not specified	Unknown	None	None	None	
Olga	March 15–20	95 (60)	985	None	None	None	
Hudah	March 24–April 9	220 (140)	905	St. Brandon, Tromelin Island, Rodrigues, Madagascar, Mozambique	Unknown	114	
BOB 01	March 27–30	85 (50)	998	Andaman and Nicobar Islands, India	Minimal	None	
Vaughan	March 28–April 7	110 (70)	985	Queensland	None	None	

=== April ===
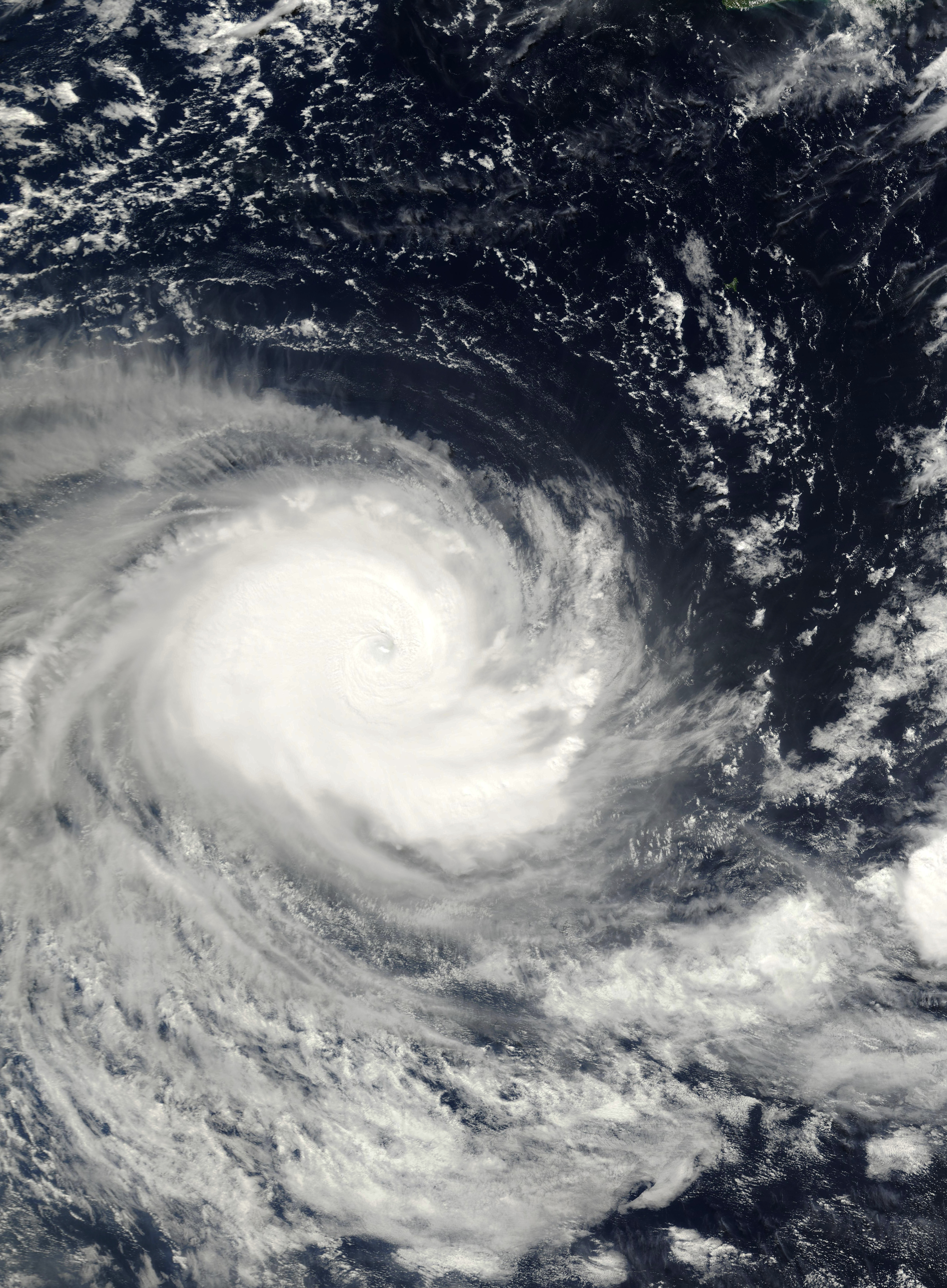
Cyclone Paul

10 systems formed in the month of April, of which 5 were named. The first storm of the month, Cyclone Tessi, made landfall on Australia as a Category 3 severe tropical cyclone on the Australian scale. Innocente was a long-lasting yet weak storm, with its remnants causing heavy rains on Mauritius. Cyclone Paul was the strongest storm of the month, peaking with a minimum central pressure of 915 hPa. Cyclone Rosita was a small yet powerful tropical cyclone, peaking with 10-min winds of 205 km/h (125 mph) and making landfall at peak intensity.

Tropical cyclones formed in April 2000
Storm name	Dates active	Max wind km/h (mph)	Pressure (hPa)	Areas affected	Damage (USD)	Deaths	Refs
Tessi	April 1–3	130 (80)	980	Queensland	$50 million	None	
TD	April 5–6	Not specified	Not specified	None	None	None	
13	April 7–15	95 (60)	992	Mozambique	None	None	
18F	April 10	Not specified	Not specified	None	None	None	
Innocente	April 12–24	70 (45)	993	Mauritius	None	None	
Paul	April 11–20	220 (140)	915	Cocos Islands	None	None	
Neil	April 12–17	75 (45)	992	Fiji	None	None	
Rosita	April 14–21	205 (125)	930	Western Australia	None	None	
20F	April 29–30	75 (45)	996	Queensland	Minimal	None	
21F	April 30–May 1	75 (45)	1000	Queensland	Minimal	None	

=== May ===
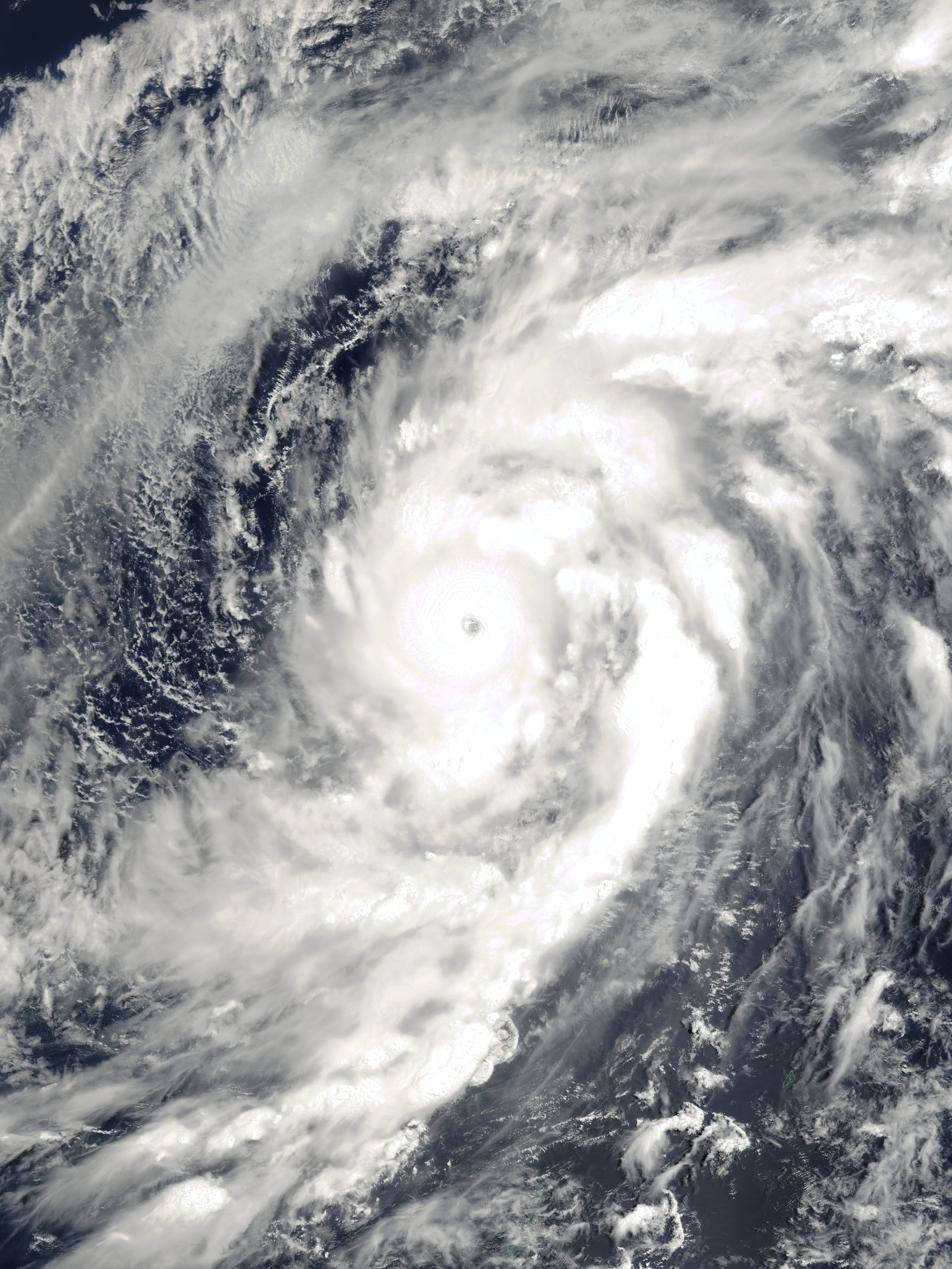
Typhoon Damrey

Tropical cyclones formed in May 2000
Storm name	Dates active	Max wind km/h (mph)	Pressure (hPa)	Areas affected	Damage (USD)	Deaths	Refs
22F	May 3–8	75 (45)	1001	None	None	None	
Damrey (Asiang)	May 4–12	165 (105)	930	Caroline Islands	None	None	
23F	May 6	Not specified	Not specified	None	None	None	
Longwang (Biring)	May 17–20	85 (50)	990	Philippines, Ryukyu Islands	None	None	
TD	May 17–18	Not specified	1000	None	None	None	
Aletta	May 22–28	165 (105)	970	Southwestern Mexico	None	None	
03W (Konsing)	May 20–22	55 (35)	1002	Philippines, Taiwan	None	None	
24F	May 20–23	75 (45)	1002	None	None	None	
04W	May 30–June 1	55 (35)	1002	Vietnam	None	None	

=== June ===
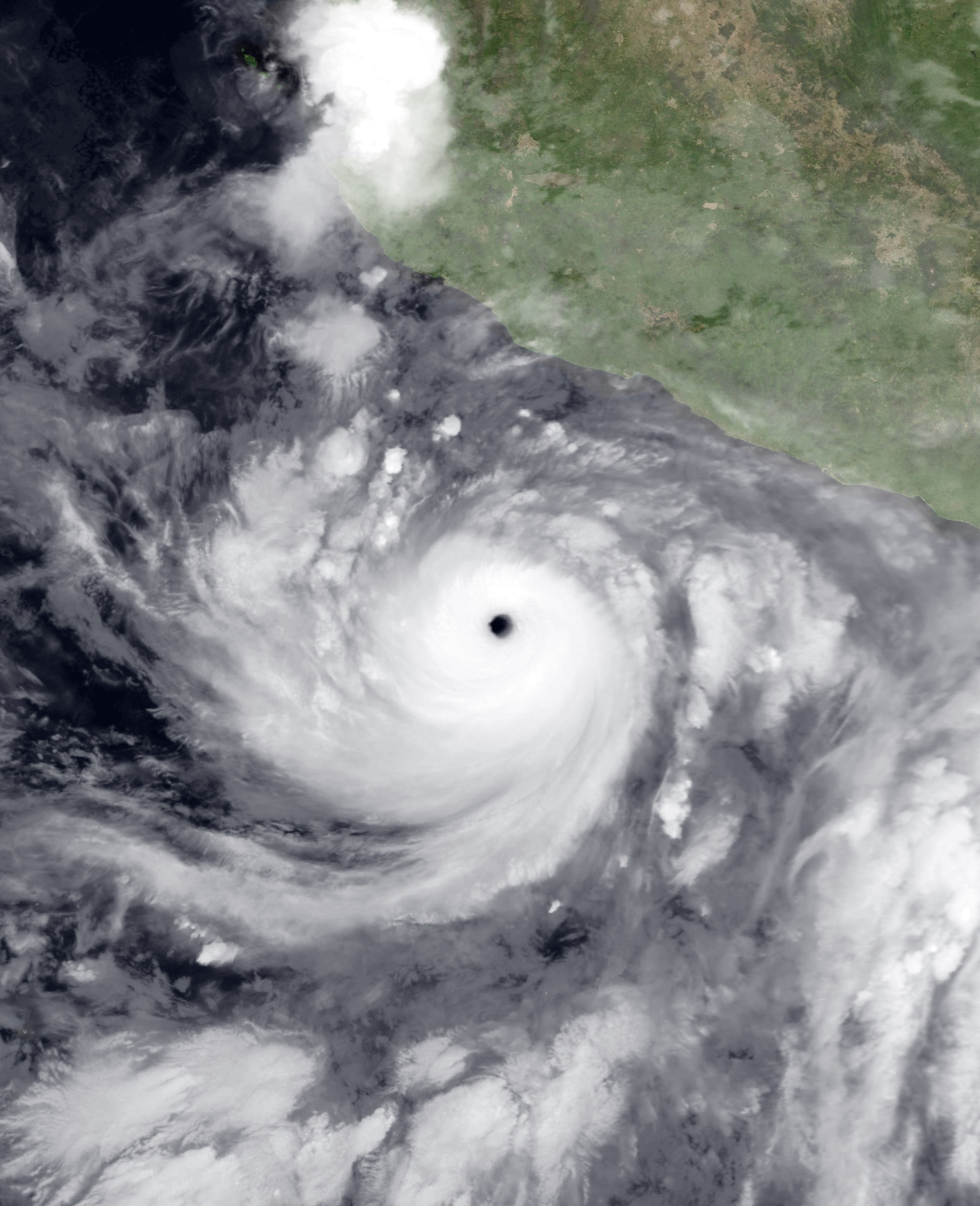
Hurricane Carlotta

June tied with November for least active month of 2000. 5 storms developed, of which 2 developed gale-force winds and were named by their respective agencies. Tropical Storm Bud was the first named storm, affecting Western Mexico. Hurricane Carlotta was the strongest storm of the month, becoming a high-end Category 4 hurricane. Carlotta caused the deaths of 18 people after sinking the M/V Linkuva.

Tropical cyclones formed in June 2000
Storm name	Dates active	Max wind km/h (mph)	Pressure (hPa)	Areas affected	Damage (USD)	Deaths	Refs
One	June 7–8	45 (30)	1008	Mexico, Texas	None	None	
Bud	June 13–17	85 (50)	994	Revillagigedo Islands, Baja California Peninsula	Minimal	None	
Carlotta	June 18–25	250 (155)	932	Mexico	Minimal	18	
TD	June 18	55 (35)	1002	South China	None	None	
Two	June 23–25	55 (35)	1008	None	None	None	

=== July ===
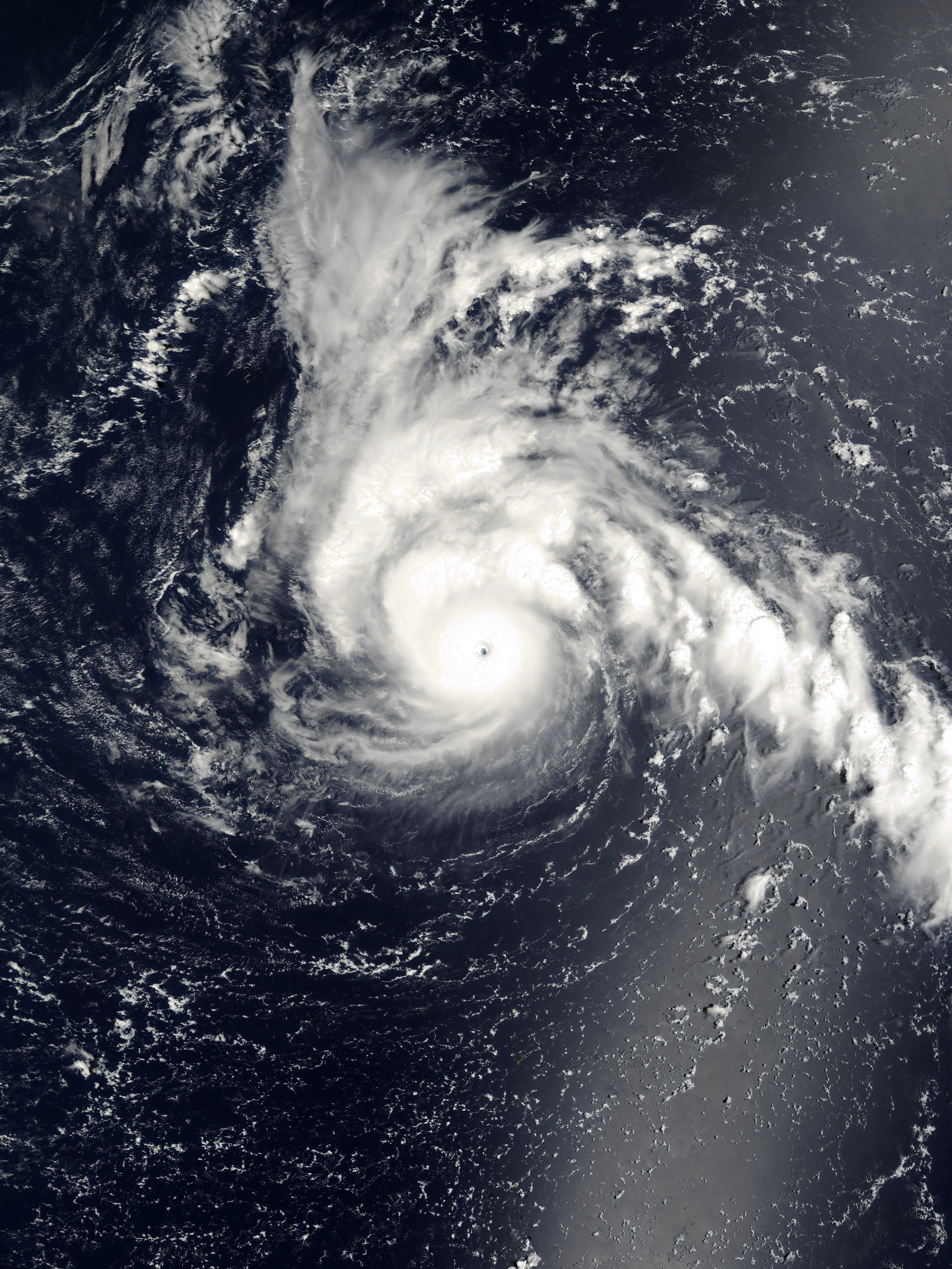
Typhoon Jelawat

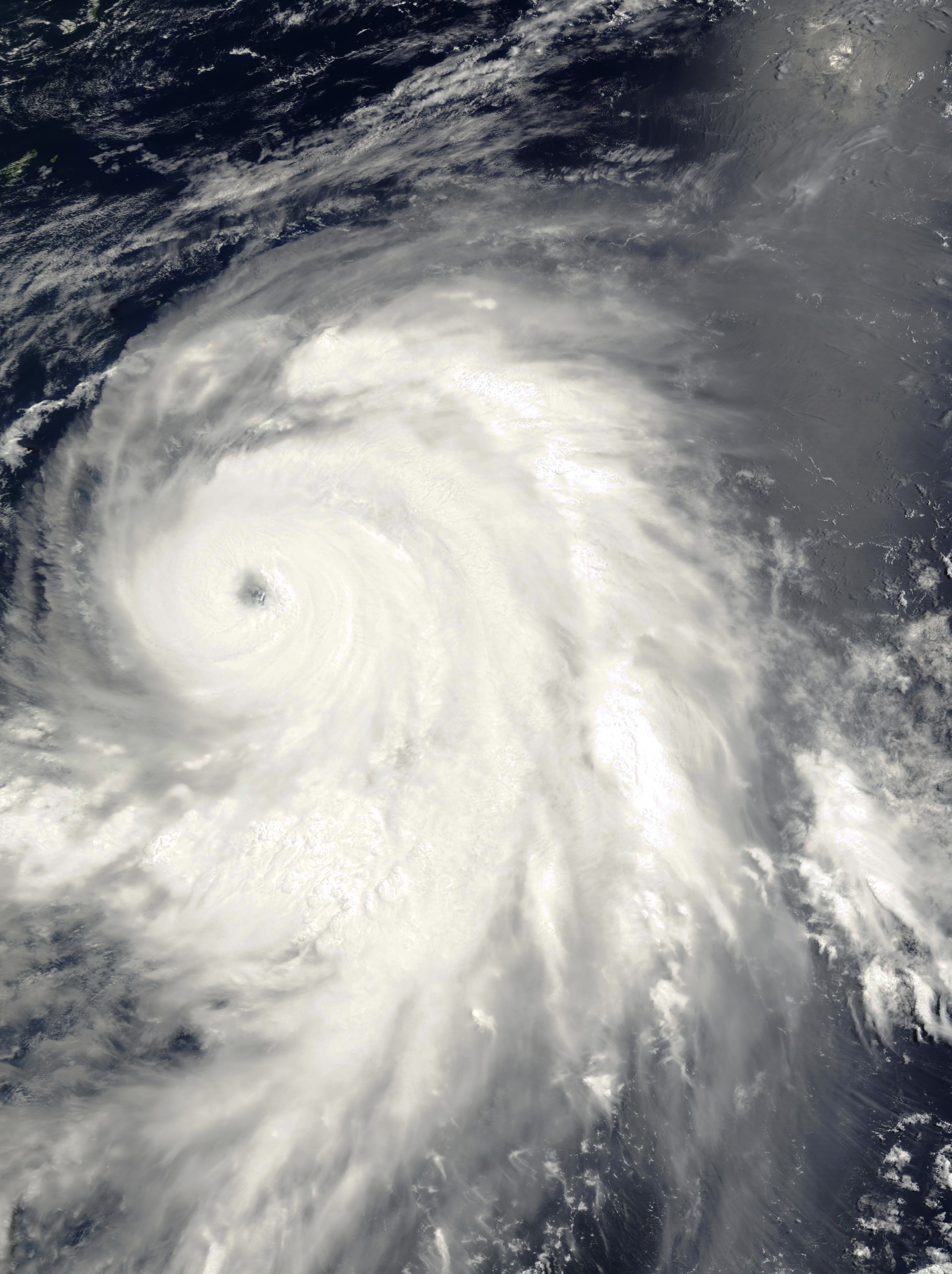
Typhoon Kirogi

Tropical cyclones formed in July 2000
Storm name	Dates active	Max wind km/h (mph)	Pressure (hPa)	Areas affected	Damage (USD)	Deaths	Refs
Kirogi (Ditang)	July 2–8	155 (100)	940	Japan	$140 million	5	
Kai-tak (Edeng)	July 3–10	140 (85)	960	Philippines, Taiwan, East China, Korea	Unknown	188	
Four-E	July 6–7	45 (30)	1007	None	None	None	
07W (Gloring)	July 11–13	55 (35)	1000	Philippines	None	None	
TD	July 11	Not specified	1000	South China	None	None	
08W	July 15–17	45 (30)	996	South China	None	None	
Tembin	July 17–23	75 (45)	992	None	None	None	
Upana	July 20–24	75 (45)	1006	None	None	None	
10W	July 20–22	45 (30)	1000	Philippines	None	None	
TD	July 21	Not specified	1004	South China, Vietnam	None	None	
Five-E	July 22–23	55 (35)	1005	None	None	None	
Daniel	July 23–August 5	205 (125)	954	Hawaiian Islands, Aleutian Islands	None	None	
Bolaven (Huaning)	July 24–31	95 (60)	980	Philippines, Ryukyu Islands, Japan, Korea, Russian Far East	$21.6 million	None	
Emilia	July 26–30	100 (65)	994	Clarion Island, Revillagigedo Islands	None	None	
Chanchu	July 27–30	65 (40)	996	None	None	None	
Jelawat	July 31–August 12	155 (100)	940	Ryukyu Islands, East China	None	None	

=== August ===
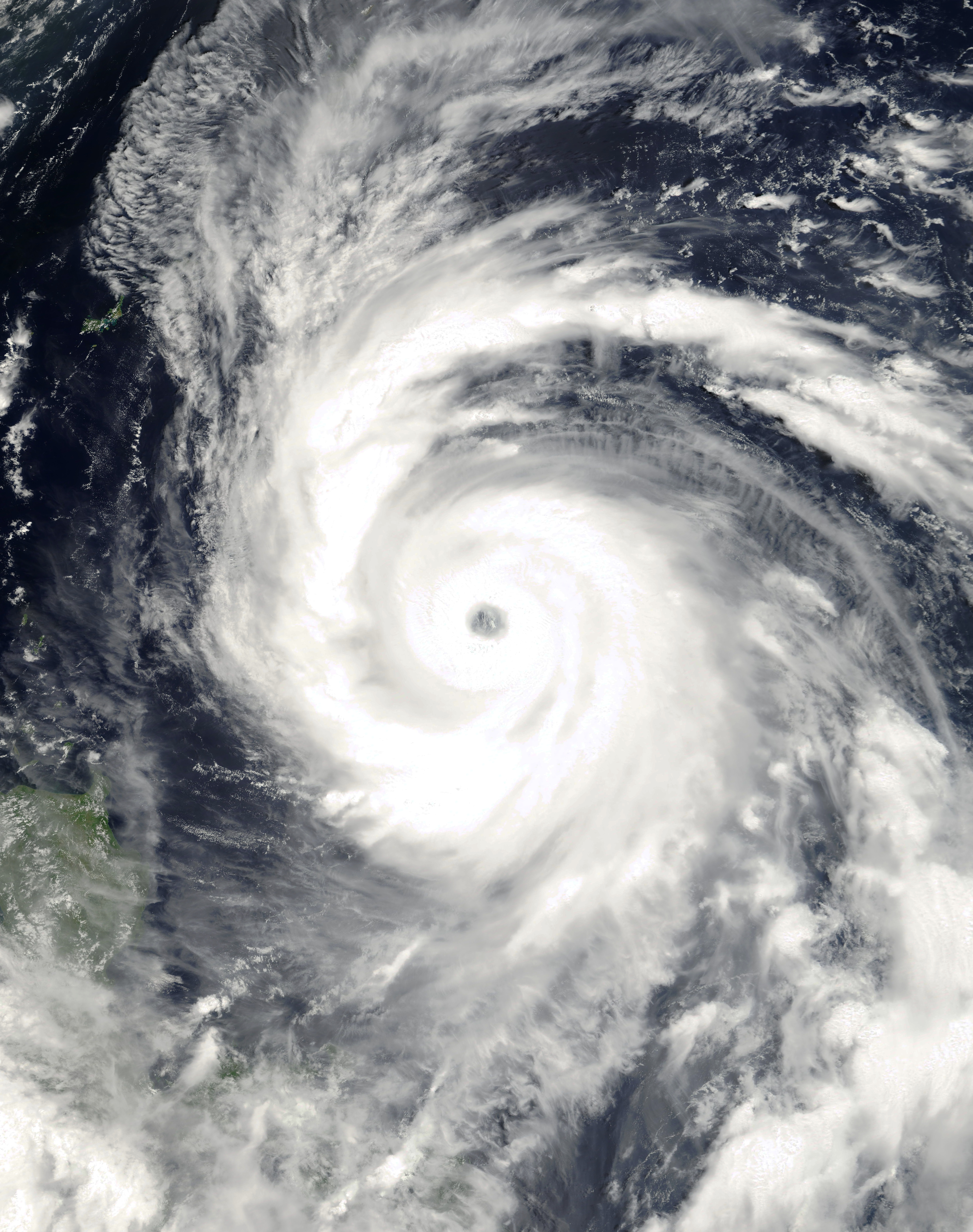
Typhoon Bilis

August was a very active month, featuring 24 systems, 16 of which were named by their respective agencies.

Tropical cyclones formed in August 2000
Storm name	Dates active	Max wind km/h (mph)	Pressure (hPa)	Areas affected	Damage (USD)	Deaths	Refs
TD	August 1–3	Not specified	1004	Ryukyu Islands, Japan, Korea	None	None	
01	August 1–3	Not specified	Unknown	None	None	None	
Alberto	August 3–23	205 (125)	950	West Africa, Bermuda, Iceland, Greenland, Jan Mayen	None	None	
Fabio	August 3–8	85 (50)	1000	None	None	None	
Gilma	August 5–11	130 (80)	984	None	None	None	
14W	August 7–10	55 (35)	1008	None	None	None	
Four	August 8–11	55 (35)	1009	None	None	None	
Ewiniar	August 9–18	120 (75)	975	Mariana Islands	None	None	
Hector	August 10–16	130 (80)	983	None	None	None	
Beryl	August 13–15	85 (50)	1007	Mexico, Texas	$27 thousand	1	
Ileana	August 13–17	110 (70)	991	Baja California Peninsula, Mexico	None	None	
Wene	August 13–17	85 (50)	1002	None	None	None	
Chris	August 17–19	65 (40)	1008	None	None	None	
17W	August 17–18	45 (30)	1008	None	None	None	
Bilis (Isang)	August 18–25	205 (125)	920	Philippines, Taiwan, China, South Korea, Ryukyu Islands, Guam	$668 million	71	
TD	August 18–20	Not specified	1004	Japan	None	None	
Debby	August 19–24	140 (85)	991	Lesser Antilles, Greater Antilles, Turks and Caicos, Florida	$735 thousand	1	
Kaemi	August 18–23	75 (45)	985	Vietnam, Cambodia	None	14	
BOB 02	August 23–24	45 (30)	994	Western India	$170 million	131	
Prapiroon (Lusing)	August 25–September 1	130 (80)	965	Japan, Taiwan, China, Korea,	$6.14 billion	75	
Maria	August 27–September 2	75 (45)	985	China	None	None	
John	August 28–September 1	110 (70)	994	None	None	None	
Kristy	August 31–September 3	65 (40)	1004	None	None	None	
TD	August 31–September 1	Not specified	1004	None	None	None	
Saomai (Osang)	August 31–September 16	175 (110)	925	Northern Mariana Islands, Guam, Japan, China, South Korea, North Korea, Russia	$6.3 billion	28	

=== September ===
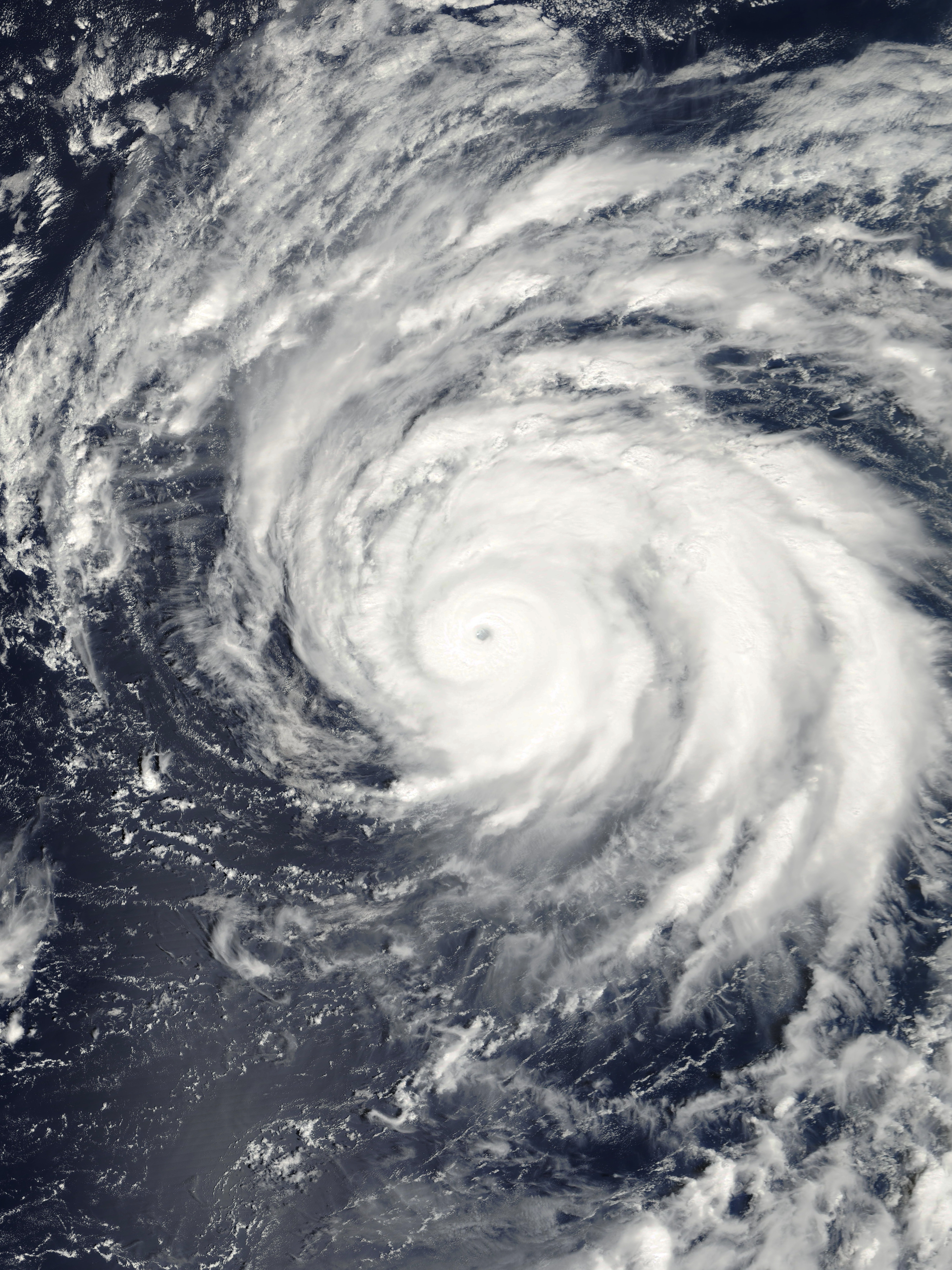
Typhoon Shanshan

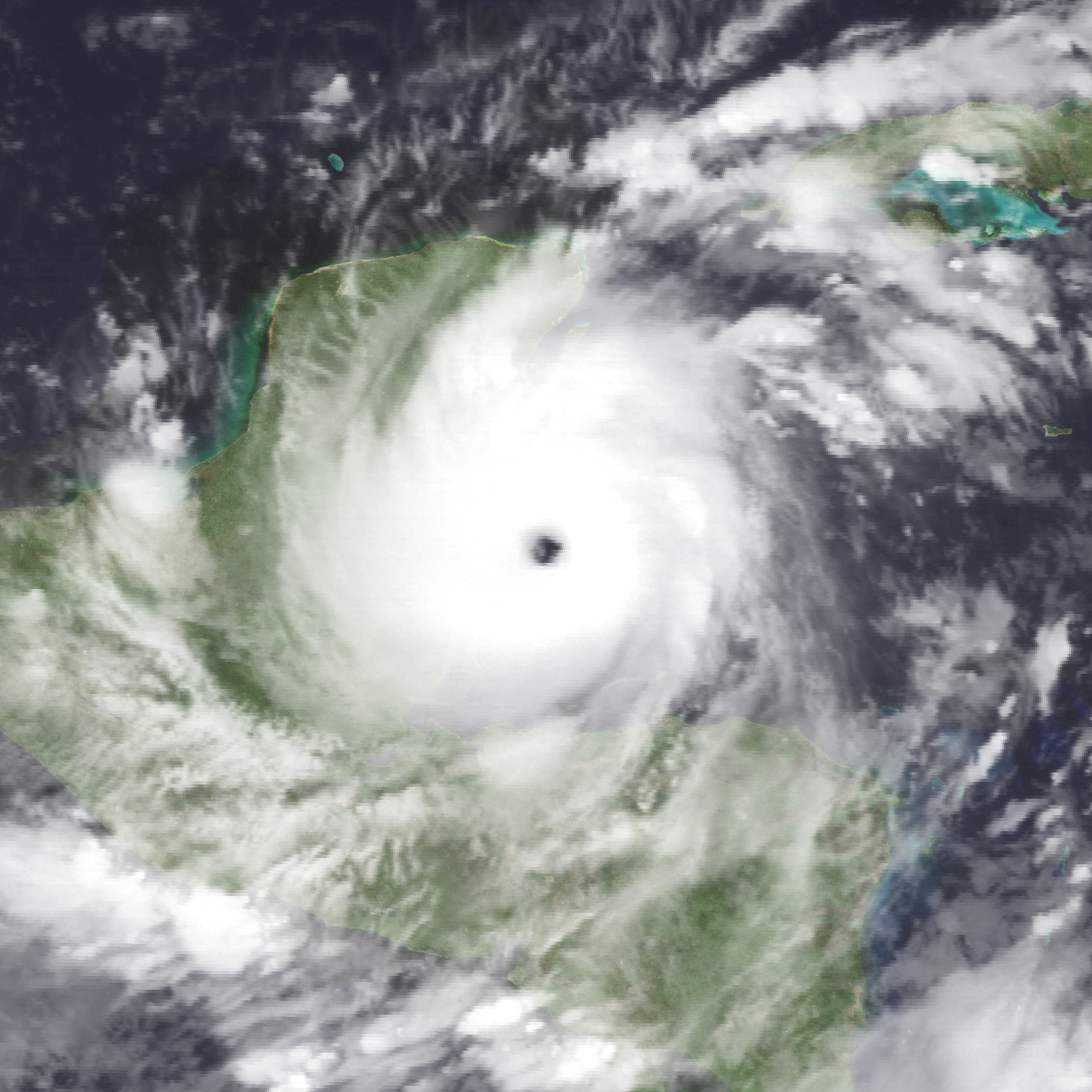
Hurricane Keith

Tropical cyclones formed in September 2000
Storm name	Dates active	Max wind km/h (mph)	Pressure (hPa)	Areas affected	Damage (USD)	Deaths	Refs
Ernesto	September 1–3	65 (40)	1008	None	None	None	
TD	September 1	Not specified	1004	None	None	None	
Bopha (Ningning)	September 4–11	85 (50)	988	Philippines, Taiwan, Ryukyu Islands	None	None	
Wukong (Maring)	September 4–10	140 (85)	955	South China, Vietnam, Laos	None	None	
Lane	September 5–14	155 (100)	964	Socorro Island, Baja California, Southwestern United States	None	None	
Nine	September 7–9	55 (35)	1006	Gulf Coast of the United States	None	None	
Florence	September 10–17	130 (80)	985	East Coast of the United States, Bermuda, Atlantic Canada	None	3	
Gordon	September 14–18	130 (80)	981	Belize, Yucatán Peninsula, Cuba, East Coast of the United States, Atlantic Canada	$10.8 million	26	
Sonamu	September 14–18	100 (65)	980	Japan	None	None	
TD	September 14–16	Not specified	1008	None	None	None	
Helene	September 15–25	110 (70)	986	Lesser Antilles, Puerto Rico, Hispaniola, Jamaica, Cuba, Isle of Youth, Eastern United States, Atlantic Canada	$16 million	2	
Miriam	September 15–17	65 (40)	1004	Mexico	$793 thousand	None	
Shanshan	September 17–24	175 (110)	925	None	None	None	
Norman	September 20–22	85 (50)	998	Mexico	$13.3 million	9	
Isaac	September 21–October 1	220 (140)	943	Cape Verde, Bermuda, Eastern United States, Bermuda, Eastern Canada, British Isles	Minimal	1	
Joyce	September 25–October 2	150 (90)	975	Trinidad and Tobago, Windward Islands, Leeward Antilles	Unknown	None	
TD	September 27–29	Not specified	1006	Vietnam	None	None	
27W	September 27–October 2	55 (35)	1008	None	None	None	
Keith	September 28–October 6	220 (140)	939	Central America, Yucatán Peninsula, Mexico, Belize	$319 million	68	

=== October ===
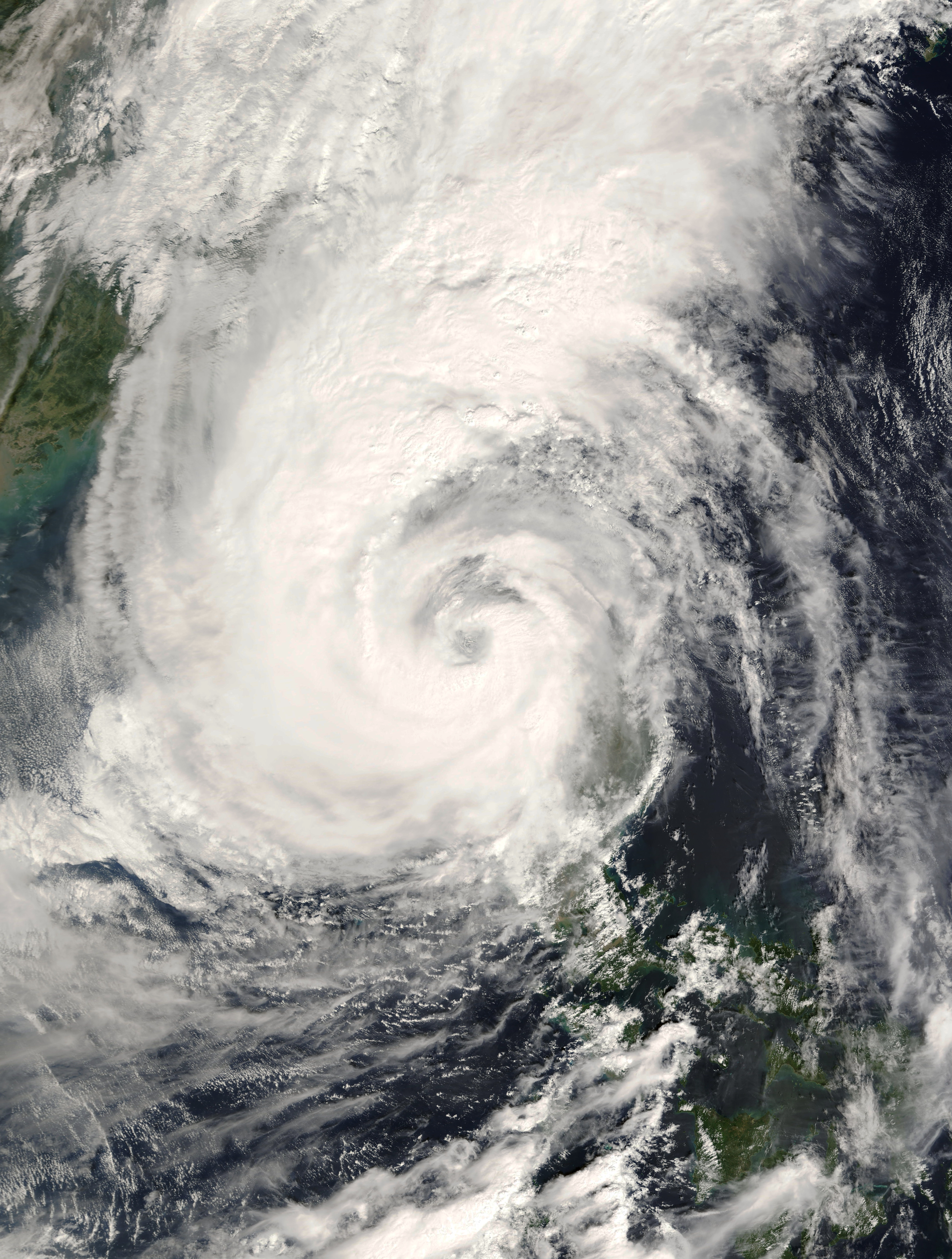
Typhoon Xangsane

Tropical cyclones formed in October 2000
Storm name	Dates active	Max wind km/h (mph)	Pressure (hPa)	Areas affected	Damage (USD)	Deaths	Refs
Olivia	October 2–10	100 (65)	994	Southwestern United States	None	None	
Leslie	October 4–7	75 (45)	1006	Cuba, Florida, Bermuda, Newfoundland	$950 million	3	
28W	October 6–13	55 (35)	998	Vietnam, South China	None	None	
TD	October 13–14	Not specified	1008	None	None	None	
BOB 03	October 15–19	65 (40)	996	Western India, Gujarat	Moderate	None	
Michael	October 15–19	155 (100)	965	Bermuda, Maine, Atlantic Canada	Unknown	None	
TD	October 17–18	Not specified	1008	None	None	None	
Nadine	October 19–22	95 (60)	999	None	None	None	
Yagi (Paring)	October 21–28	130 (80)	965	Ryukyu Islands, Taiwan	None	None	
Xangsane (Reming)	October 24–November 1	140 (85)	960	Caroline Islands, Philippines, Taiwan, Japan	Unknown	182	
Unnamed	October 25–29	100 (65)	976	New England, Atlantic Canada	Unknown	None	
Paul	October 25–29	75 (45)	1003	Hawaii	$70 million	None	
BOB 04	October 25–29	65 (40)	998	Bangladesh, Odisha	$13 million	77	
Bebinca	October 30–November 7	110 (70)	980	Philippines, South China	None	26	

=== November ===
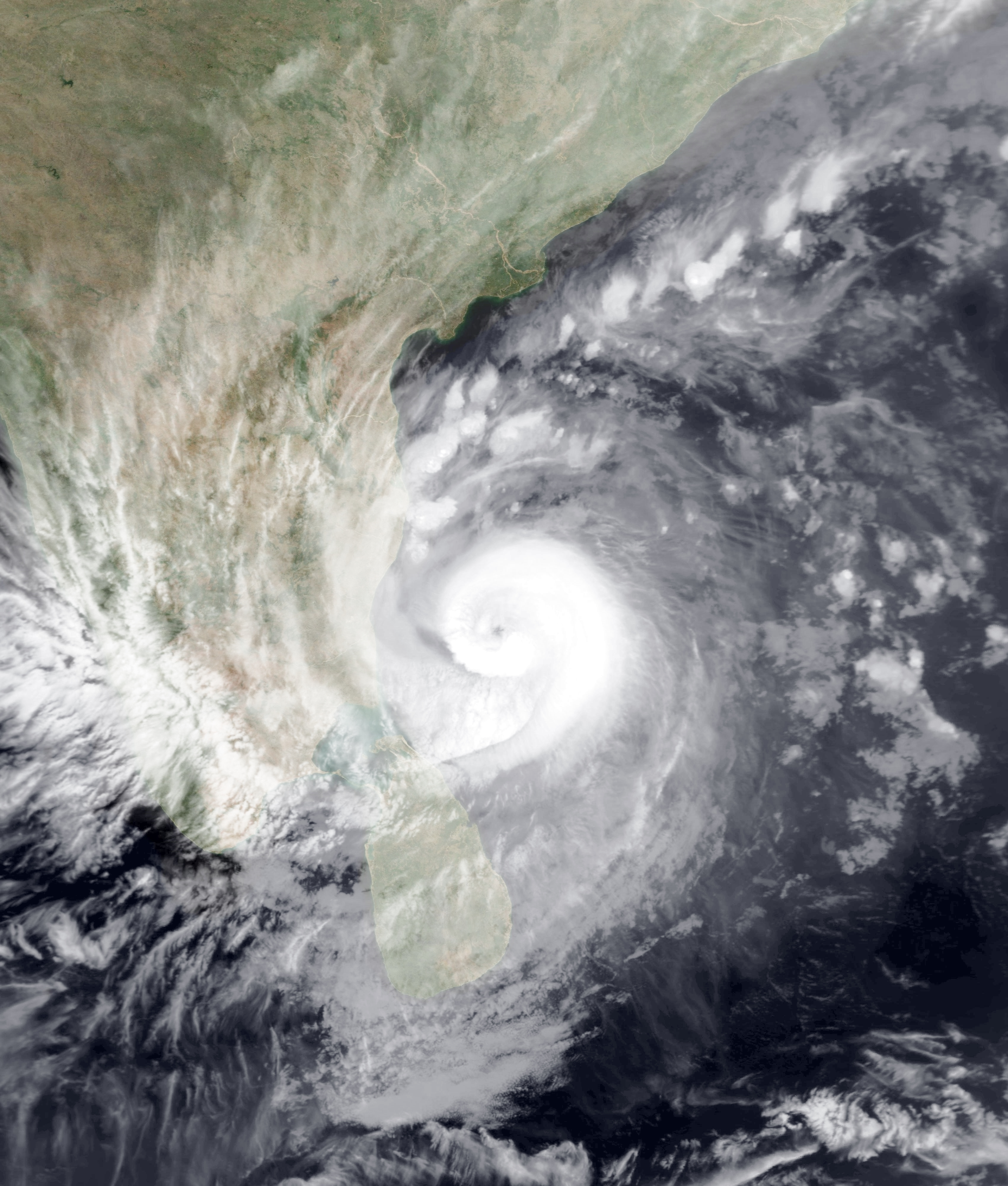
BOB 05

The month of November saw 5 systems form, tying with June for the least active month. 3 systems attained gale-force winds, though only 2 were given names by their respective agencies. Rosa was the first storm of the month, forming on November 3 and peaking as a tropical storm. 2 more systems formed before BOB 05, also known as the 2000 South India cyclone, formed in the Bay of Bengal. The cyclone peaked as an extremely severe cyclonic storm, making it the strongest storm of the month before weakening at landfall. The last storm of the month, Rumbia, affected the Philippines and Vietnam, causing 48 fatalities.

Tropical cyclones formed in November 2000
Storm name	Dates active	Max wind km/h (mph)	Pressure (hPa)	Areas affected	Damage (USD)	Deaths	Refs
Rosa	November 3–8	100 (65)	993	Southwestern Mexico, Central America	$21 thousand	None	
32W	November 7–9	55 (35)	1004	Ryukyu Islands	None	None	
02	November 12–18	Unknown	Unknown	None	None	None	
BOB 05	November 26–30	190 (115)	958	South India, Somalia	$15 million	12	
Rumbia (Toyang)	November 27–December 7	75 (45)	990	Philippines, Vietnam	$1 million	48	

=== December ===
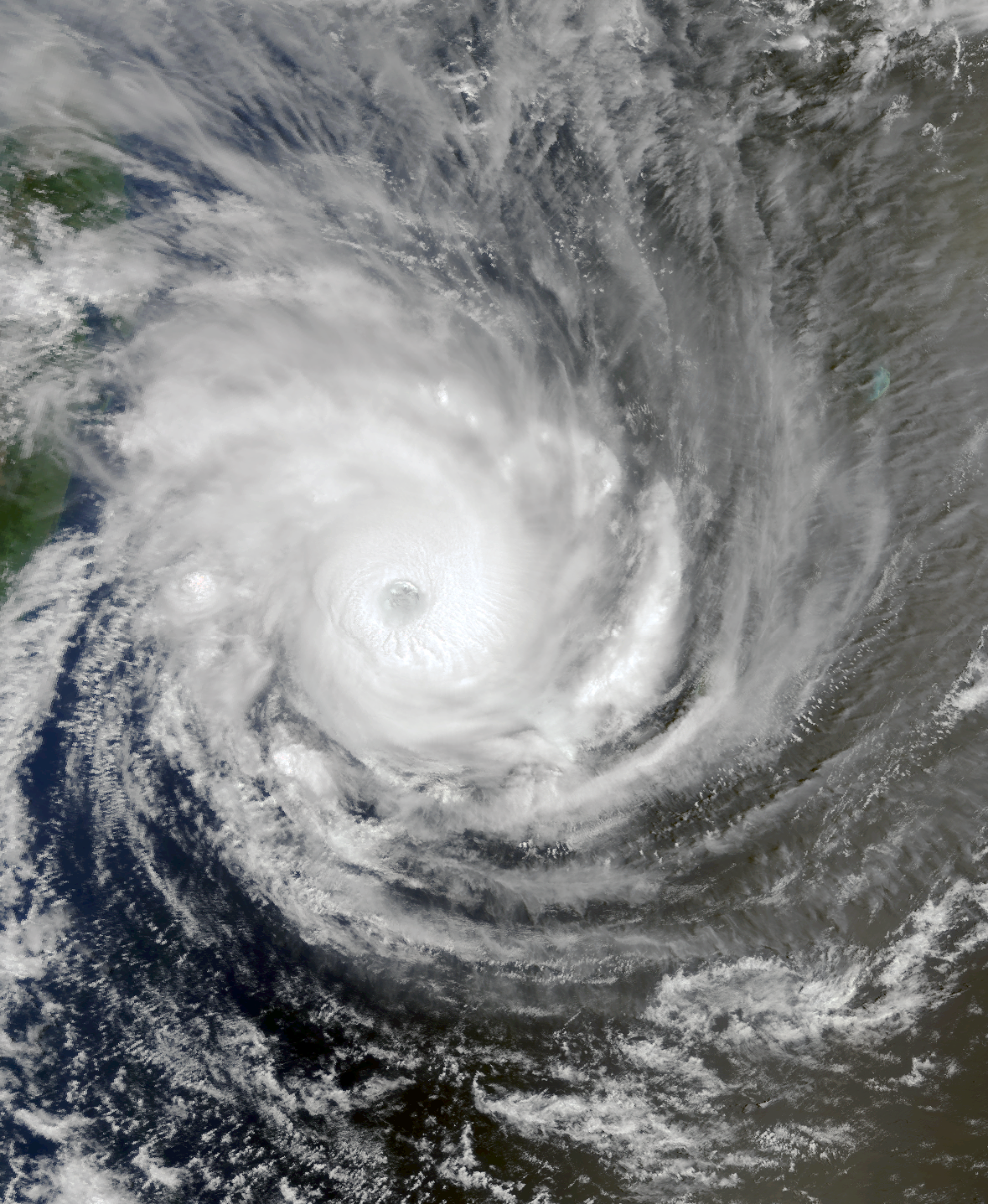
Cyclone Ando

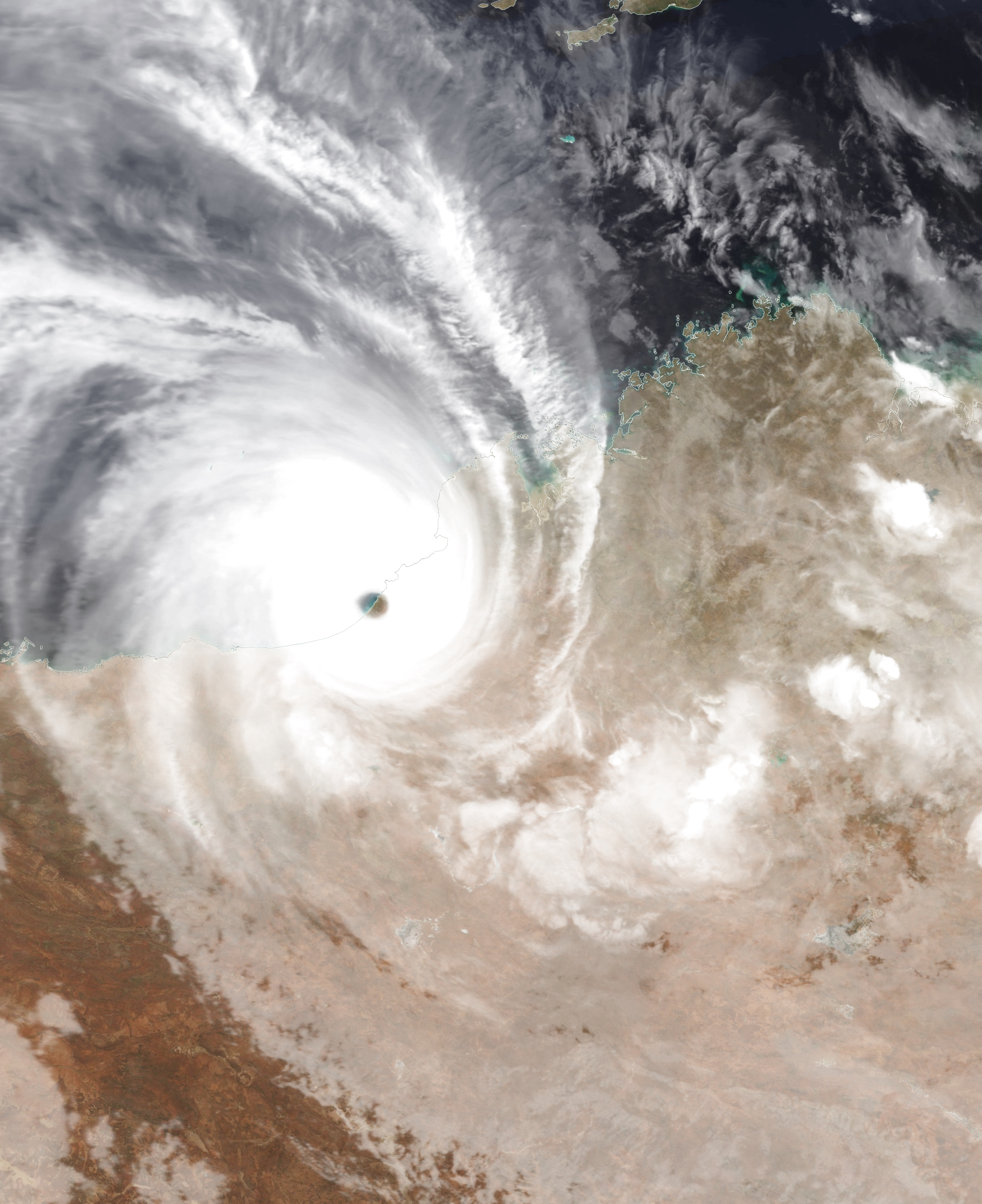
Cyclone Sam

The month of December saw 7 systems form, with 4 of the storms being named by their respective agencies. The month began with Cyclone Sam, which intensified into a Category 5 severe tropical cyclone on the Australian scale, making landfall on Western Australia at peak intensity. Ulpiang was a short-lived storm that caused flooding and deaths in the Philippines. BOB 06, also known as the 2000 Sri Lanka cyclone, was the strongest storm to hit Sri Lanka since 1978, being attributed to 9 deaths. 2 tropical depressions formed in the West Pacific before Soulik formed and rapidly intensified into a moderately strong typhoon. The year finished with Cyclone Ando, peaking offshore as an intense tropical cyclone.

Tropical cyclones formed in December 2000
Storm name	Dates active	Max wind km/h (mph)	Pressure (hPa)	Areas affected	Damage (USD)	Deaths	Refs
Sam	December 3–10	205 (125)	935	Western Australia	Minor	None	
Ulpiang	December 6–8	55 (35)	1004	Philippines	None	3	
BOB 06	December 23–28	165 (105)	970	Sri Lanka, India	Minimal	9	
TD	December 24	Not specified	1008	None	None	None	
TD	December 24	Not specified	1006	None	None	None	
Soulik (Welpring)	December 29–January 4	150 (90)	955	None	None	None	
Ando	December 31–January 9	195 (120)	925	Seychelles, Agaléga, Tromelin, Mauritius, Réunion	None	2	

== Global effects ==
Season name	Areas affected	Systems formed	Named storms	Damage (USD)	Deaths
2000 Atlantic hurricane season ^{5}	Mexico, Senegal, East Coast of the United States, Iceland, Greenland, Jan Mayen, Antillean Islands, Gulf Coast of the United States, Bermuda, Newfoundland, British Isles, Cape Verde, Central America, Atlantic Canada	19	15	$1.296 billion	105
2000 Pacific hurricane season ^{5}	Mexico, Revillagigedo Islands, Hawaiian Islands, Aleutian Islands, Southwestern United States, Texas, Central America	21	19	$84.3 million	27
2000 Pacific typhoon season	Mariana Islands, Caroline Islands, Philippines, Ryukyu Islands, Taiwan, China, Japan, Korea, Russia, Vietnam, Cambodia, Laos	51	23	>$13.12 billion	467
2000 North Indian Ocean cyclone season ^{4}	Andaman and Nicobar Islands, India, Bangladesh, Sri Lanka	6	5	$195 million	229
1999–2000 South-West Indian Ocean cyclone season ^{2} ^{6}	Mauritius, Réunion, Rodrigues, Madagascar, Southern Africa, Île Amsterdam, St. Brandon, Tromelin Island	13	8	$800 million	1,044
2000–01 South-West Indian Ocean cyclone season ^{3} ^{6}	Seychelles, Agaléga, Tromelin Island, Mauritius, Réunion	3	1	None	2
1999–2000 Australian region cyclone season ^{2}	Queensland, Northern Territory, Western Australia, Cocos Islands	11	11	Unknown	Unknown
2000–01 Australian region cyclone season ^{3}	Western Australia	1	1	Minor	None
1999–2000 South Pacific cyclone season ^{2}	Vanuatu, Fiji, French Polynesia, Queensland	19	6	Unknown	>1
2000–01 South Pacific cyclone season	None	None	None	None	None
Worldwide	(See above)	140 (Note: The sum of the number of systems and fatalities in each basin will not equal the number shown as the total. This is because when systems move between basins, it creates a discrepancy in the actual number of systems and fatalities.)	81	> $15.495 billion	>1875

== See also ==
- Tropical cyclones by year
- List of earthquakes in 2000
- Tornadoes of 2000

== Notes ==
^{2} Only systems that formed either on or after January 1, 2000 are counted in the seasonal totals.
^{3} Only systems that formed either before or on December 31, 2000 are counted in the seasonal totals.
^{4} The wind speeds for this tropical cyclone/basin are based on the IMD Scale which uses 3-minute sustained winds.
^{5} The wind speeds for this tropical cyclone/basin are based on the Saffir Simpson Scale which uses 1-minute sustained winds.
^{6} The wind speeds for this tropical cyclone are based on Météo-France which uses wind gusts.
