= Cyclone Rosita =

Category 5 Australian region cyclone in 2000

Severe Tropical Cyclone Rosita
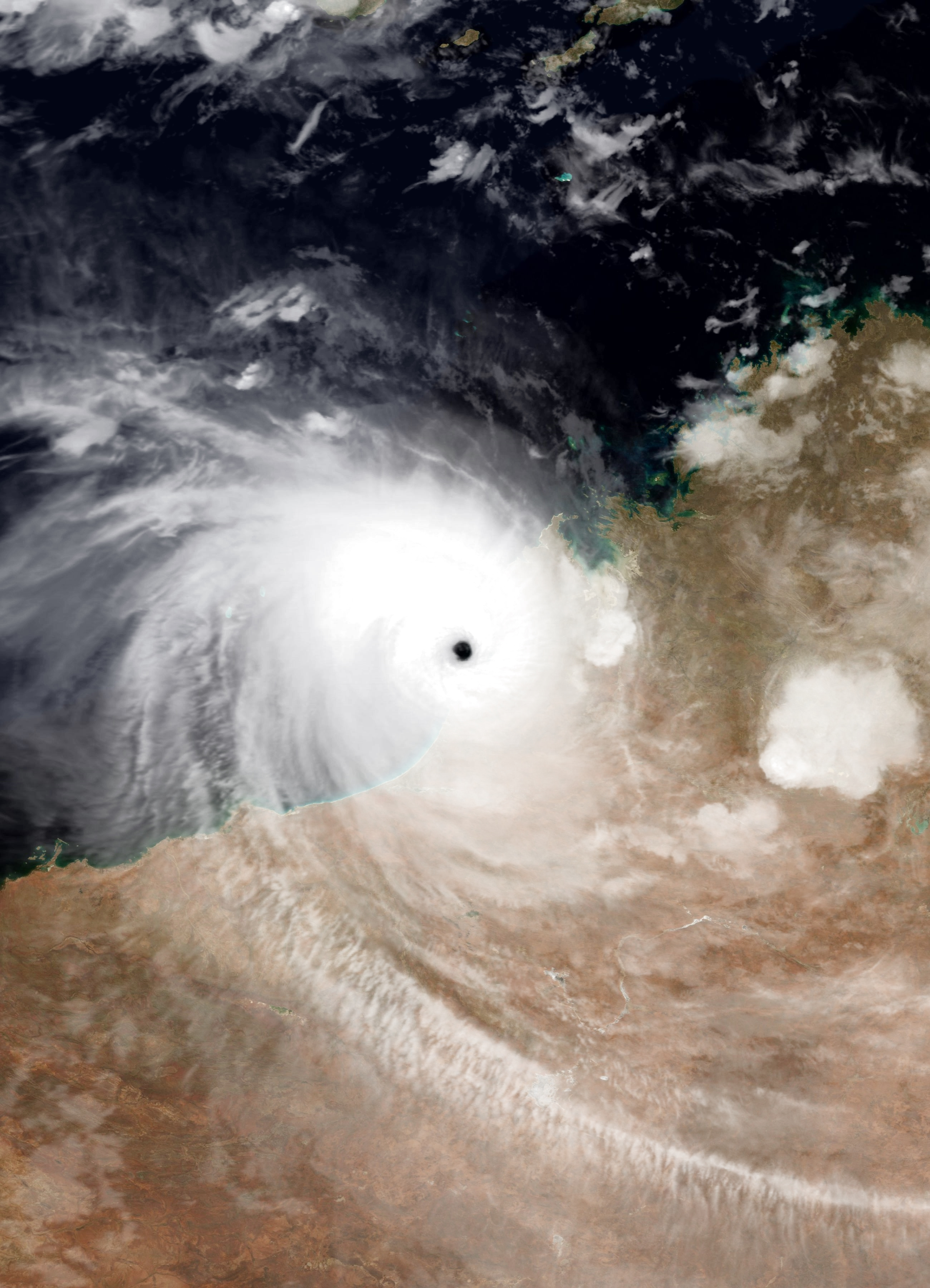
- Rosita near peak intensity prior to landfall on 19 April

Meteorological history
- Formed: 15 April 2000
- Dissipated: 21 April 2000

Category 5 severe tropical cyclone
- 10-minute sustained (Aus)
- Highest winds: 220 km/h (140 mph)
- Lowest pressure: 930 hPa (mbar); 27.46 inHg

Category 4-equivalent tropical cyclone
- 1-minute sustained (SSHWS/JTWC)
- Highest winds: 230 km/h (145 mph)

Overall effects
- Fatalities: None
- Damage: Unknown
- Areas affected: Western Australia (especially Broome)
- IBTrACS
- Part of the 1999–2000 Australian region cyclone season

Severe Tropical Cyclone Rosita was a tropical cyclone that affected northern Australia from 15 April through 21 April 2000. Rosita was one of the most intense tropical cyclones to hit the west Kimberley coast in the last century. Crossing the coast as a Category 5 about 40 kilometres (25 mi) south of Broome on 20 April, Rosita caused severe damage in the Eco Beach resort and the vegetation around Broome. Its region of very destructive winds (gusts exceeding 170 km/h) passed south of Broome by only 15 kilometres (9.3 mi). Cyclone Rosita was the first cyclone to directly hit Broome since Cyclone Lindsay in March 1985.

== Meteorological history ==
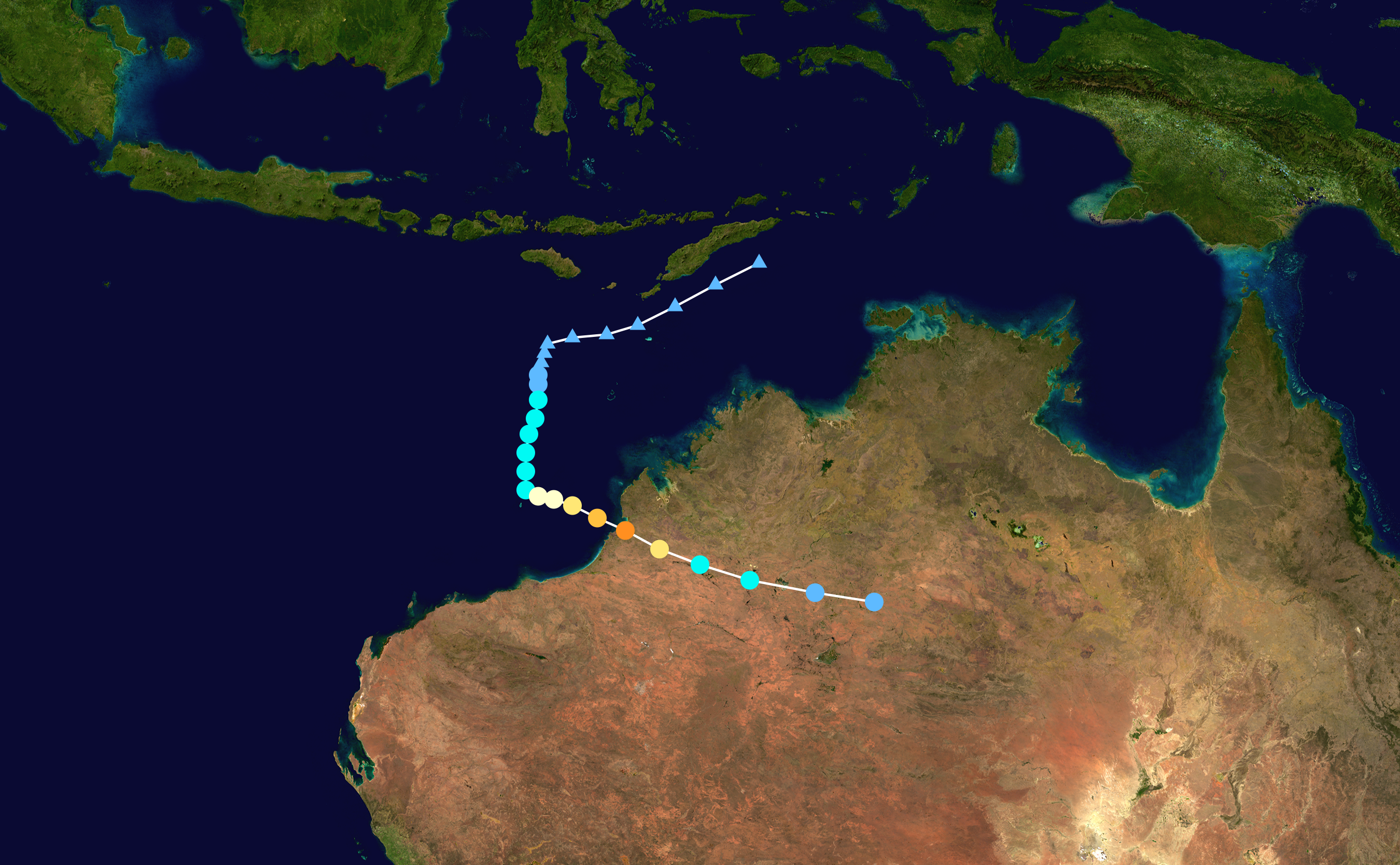
Map plotting the storm's track and intensity, according to the Saffir–Simpson scale Map key Saffir–Simpson scale Tropical depression (≤38 mph, ≤62 km/h) Tropical storm (39–73 mph, 63–118 km/h) Category 1 (74–95 mph, 119–153 km/h) Category 2 (96–110 mph, 154–177 km/h) Category 3 (111–129 mph, 178–208 km/h) Category 4 (130–156 mph, 209–251 km/h) Category 5 (≥157 mph, ≥252 km/h) Unknown Storm type Tropical cyclone Subtropical cyclone Extratropical cyclone, remnant low, tropical disturbance, or monsoon depression

A weak low in the Timor Sea formed on 14 April, initially moving west south-west and turned southward during 16 April and 17 April. The low slowly strengthened and was named Rosita on 17 April, while located approximately 670 kilometres (420 mi) to the north of Port Hedland at about 6 p.m. WST (1000 UTC). On the morning of 18 April, a ship reported a relatively high pressure of 997 hPa while passing very close to the centre of Cyclone Rosita, however, near-storm-force winds were reported.

Rosita then entered a very favourable environment which allowed rapid development to occur. On 19 April, Rosita turned to the east-southeast and intensified rapidly to a Category 5 severe cyclone, with an estimated central pressure of 930 hPa. Wind gusts near the centre were estimated at 290 km/h (180 mph). Rosita turned slightly to the southeast, crossing the coast at peak intensity, 40 kilometres (25 mi) south of Broome at around 1 a.m. WST on 20 April (1700 UTC 19 April). Cyclone Rosita was a small cyclone, but nevertheless was very intense and powerful. Its radius of gale-force winds was just half the average for cyclones in Australia, and its core of very destructive winds extended just 25 kilometres (16 mi) from its centre. This meant that Rosita's region of very destructive winds missed Broome by only 15 kilometres (9.3 mi) to the south. Once over land, Rosita accelerated to speeds of up to 30 km/h (19 mph) into the Great Sandy Desert, only weakening gradually. Rosita passed close to the community of Balgo at around 10 p.m. WST (1400 UTC) on 20 April, about 700 kilometres (430 mi) from the coast. Rosita was still estimated to be at Category 1 intensity when it passed near the community. Rosita's remnants continued to bring flooding rains to central Australia.

== Preparations ==
The Bureau of Meteorology predicted Rosita to hit near Broome at around midnight WST on 20 April (1600 UTC 19 April). Towns around the area were warned to prepare for one of the most powerful cyclones ever to threaten Australia. Very destructive winds with gusts to 260 km/h near the cyclone's centre were expected. Residents of coastal towns were warned to expect dangerous storm tides – local emergency officials said an 8-metre (26 ft) high tide was expected at that night. Tourists in the area were warned not to try to reach Broome. Chevron Australia said a tanker due to arrive on 18 April was asked to delay its arrival till 22 April because of the cyclone. Iron ore miners in Port Hedland and Dampier monitored Rosita's approach.

Blue Alert warnings, which indicate that a cyclone may affect the warning area within 48 hours, were issued for Cyclone Rosita on the morning on 19 April. They were upgraded to a Yellow Alert – an indication that a cyclone appears inevitable to affect the warning area in 12 hours – at 1 pm, then to a Red Alert – meaning the cyclone is imminent – at 8 pm. In general, residents were well informed of the warnings through the radio. Residents from the low-lying downtown areas evacuated to homes in more elevated locations. Two of the three available evacuation shelters were opened and co-ordinated by the Department of Family and Children's Services. 280 people took shelter in schools, while 78 residents from Bidyadanga were evacuated to Port Hedland or Broome. The people that stayed in the settlement sheltered in the church and family homes. Staff and guests at the Eco Beach tourist resort received warnings from Rosita early on 19 April and made a timely return to Broome before the cyclone hit.

== Impact ==
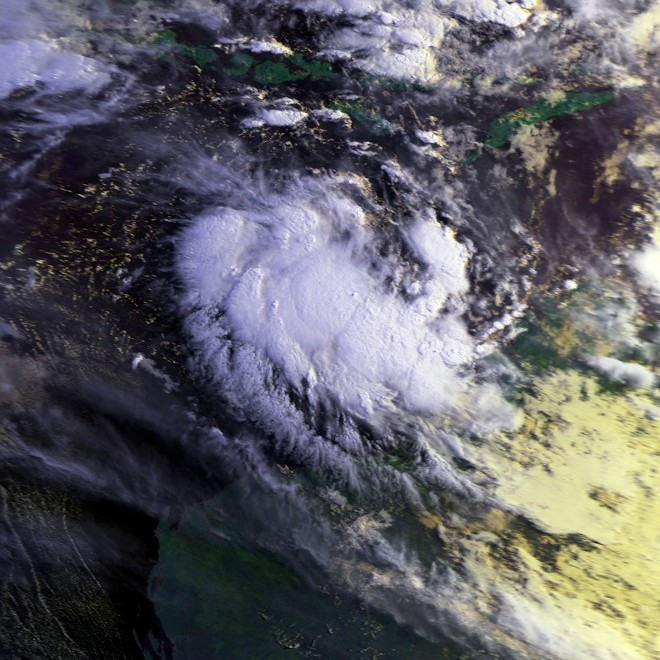
Rosita as a Tropical Low on 16 April

The largest impact occurred near the core of very destructive winds about 40 km (25 mi) south of Broome. The main homestead on the Thangoo station, 28 km (17 mi) to the south-southeast of Broome, received only minor structural damage, however the station was in the region of the dangerous storm surge. Reports from the Thangoo station, situated 2.5 km (1.6 mi) inland from coastal mangroves, showed that the station's front gate had debris laid up to the second shoreline, about a metre (3.3 ft) above mean ground level. Another station homestead, 7 km (4.3 mi) west, was covered by coastal dunes but escaped major damage to its structure.

The most severe structural damage occurred near Cape Villaret, 40 km (25 mi) south-southwest of Broome. The Eco-beach tourist resort and the Yardoogarra station were devastated. The area around the homestead was totally devastated. A caravan parked nearby was blown away and crumbled, and a semi trailer was blown to its side. The vegetation, which used to be very lush, was stripped of all leaves by the destructive winds which carried airborne salt and sand. The damage to the vegetation seemed to be worse than the tree damage seen in Exmouth caused by Cyclone Vance in March 1999. About 60 km (37 mi) of fencing was pushed over, all windmills were destroyed, and about 200 head of cattle were lost, mostly due to drowning from the storm surge. However, the path of destruction to the vegetation was estimated to be just 15 to 20 km wide, reflecting Rosita's small size.

The Eco Beach tourist resort was only built to resist wind gusts of Category 3 strength. Only about 10 of the 40 accommodation huts were left standing. Some of the huts were removed from their concrete foundations, and were carried by the winds and smashed into other buildings. Showing how strong Rosita's winds were, a sea container weighing 2.5 tonnes (5500 lb) and filled with 2 to 3 tonnes (4400 to 6600 lb) of equipment was blown 700 m (0.4 mile) across sand dunes. The magnitude of the devastation to the vegetation in this area resembled a place being destroyed by bushfires.

In the town of Broome, the maximum wind gust recorded was 153 km/h (95 mph), recorded at the Broome aerodrome, as well as recording 163.8 mm (6.45 in) of rain for the 24 hours up to 9 a.m. WST (0100 UTC) on 20 April. Vegetation in this area were badly damaged, particularly the African Mahogany trees which were either snapped off or uprooted. Parts of Cable Beach were severely eroded. An area which used to be covered with sand was completely covered by rocks. The eastern side of Roebuck Bay had evidence of severe erosion of the coastal terrain. At Broome's only banana plantation, almost all crops were completely lost, with 10 out of 18,000 plants left surviving. Fortunately, most buildings in the town of Broome remained unharmed, although power supplies were cut to many parts of Broome for several days. The Broome power station was initially shut down at approximately midnight on 20 April amid fears of damage to the power reticulation infrastructure.

Some damages to trees and property were reported in the community of Balgo Hills, located in the Great Sandy Desert approximately 700 km (430 mi) inland from the coast.

== Aftermath ==
The extended period of power outage was a major problem for the residents in Broome. Residents had to wait for days for the power supply to be restored. As all of the distribution lines were above ground, Broome was particularly vulnerable to power outages during cyclones. Linesmen from Western Power were called in from afar to inspect all high voltage distribution lines before these could be re-energised. Western Power inspectors were also flown in from around the state to commence disconnections of properties suspected to have suffered water intrusion. These properties had to be tested before having supply reconnected. The majority of residential properties had power restored back on 30 April, 11 days after Rosita struck. Television and radio were limited to transmissions from Perth, and this proved difficult to access information about any available supplies in the town. People had difficulties purchasing food and supplies because supermarkets were closed or had no power and there was no fresh produce arriving. However, power was restored a few days after the cyclone hit. There were only minor interruptions to the water and sewerage infrastructure.

The Western Australia State Emergency Service (SES) was responsible for responses relating to the damage from Rosita. SES workers worked to help the community recover, tarping damaged roofs and clearing debris from roads and around houses where it limited access from residents. Most work involved clearing vegetation from power lines to enable Western Power to begin repairs. Volunteers from other Western Australian cities and towns such as Perth, Bunbury, Karratha, Derby and Tom Price had arrived to assist with requests for help. During the recovery period, the SES earned huge public respect, and residents were pleased with the quick response of the SES.

The damage from Rosita made a large impact on the tourist industry. The time of impact happened just before the Easter and ANZAC Day Holiday period. Easter is considered to be the beginning of the tourist season, so it is usually expected that there will be an increase of visitors into Broome at this time. Many visitors delayed or cancelled their trips, and some cut short their holiday. Car hire companies that had been booked out for the holiday period had people returning vehicles early.

The impact of Rosita has alerted residents to prepare for any cyclones that may threaten the town in the future. Many people were surprised that Cyclone Rosita was going to hit, as cyclones are rare in Broome, and many thought the cyclone season was already over. However, many residents also thought that the cyclone's impact strengthened the community as a whole and "brought people closer together".

=== Retirement ===
The name Rosita was removed from the official list of tropical cyclone names set out by the Tropical Cyclone Warning Centre in Perth. It was replaced with the name Robyn.

== See also ==
- Australian region tropical cyclone
- Tropical cyclones in 2000
