= 2000 South India cyclone =

Cyclonic Storm in the North Indian ocean in 2000

Extremely Severe Cyclonic Storm BOB 05
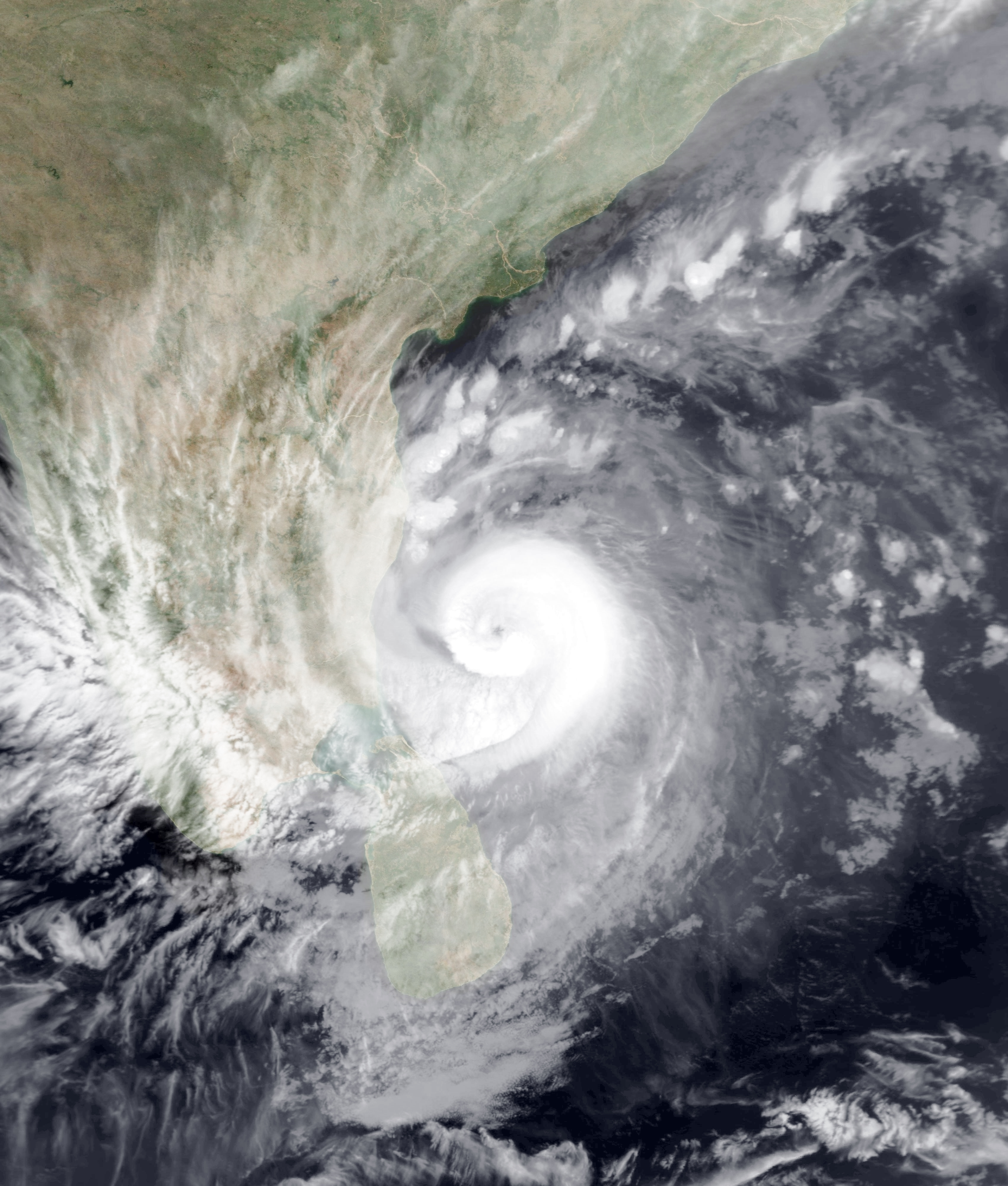
- The cyclone at peak intensity, prior to landfall in Tamil Nadu on 28 November.

Meteorological history
- Formed: 26 November 2000
- Remnant low: 30 November
- Dissipated: 6 December 2000

Extremely severe cyclonic storm
- 3-minute sustained (IMD)
- Highest winds: 190 km/h (115 mph)
- Lowest pressure: 958 hPa (mbar); 28.29 inHg

Category 1-equivalent tropical cyclone
- 1-minute sustained (SSHWS/JTWC)
- Highest winds: 120 km/h (75 mph)

Overall effects
- Fatalities: 12 total
- Damage: ₹700 million
- Areas affected: Andaman Islands, Nicobar Islands, South India, Sri Lanka, Somalia
- Part of the 2000 North Indian Ocean cyclone season

The 2000 South Indian Cyclone (IMD designation: BOB 05 JTWC designation: 05B) was the strongest, most intense tropical cyclone of the fairly-quiet 2000 North Indian Ocean cyclone season. The fifth cyclone, and the fourth named storm, Extremely Severe Cyclonic Storm BOB 05 started as an upper-level low over the Andaman Sea on 24 November. On early 26 November, the group of thunderstorms was classified as a depression by the IMD. The system slowly began to organize, and late on 26 November the JTWC named it as Tropical Cyclone 03B. By 28 November, a 20 km (12 mi)-wide eye was developing, prompting the JTWC to upgrade the storm to the equivalent of a minimal hurricane with winds of 120 km/h (75 mph). By comparison, the IMD estimated peak winds of 190 km/h (120 mph). Wind shear in the region prevented further strengthening, and the storm weakened slightly before making landfall on 29 November in eastern India near Cuddalore. A station there recorded a pressure of 983 mbar (29.0 inHg).

The storm rapidly weakened over land, and degenerated into a remnant low on 30 November. The remnants emerged into the eastern Arabian Sea on 1 December, by which time most thunderstorms had dissipated over the deteriorating center. Two days later, the JTWC reissued advisories, based on an increase in outflow and convective organization. This was short-lived, as the thunderstorms soon dwindled, and the JTWC ceased issuing advisories on 5 December. The remnants continued westward without development toward eastern Somalia.

As many as 12 people died from the storm. The storm caused ₹700 million rupees (US$15 million) in damages.

== Meteorological history ==
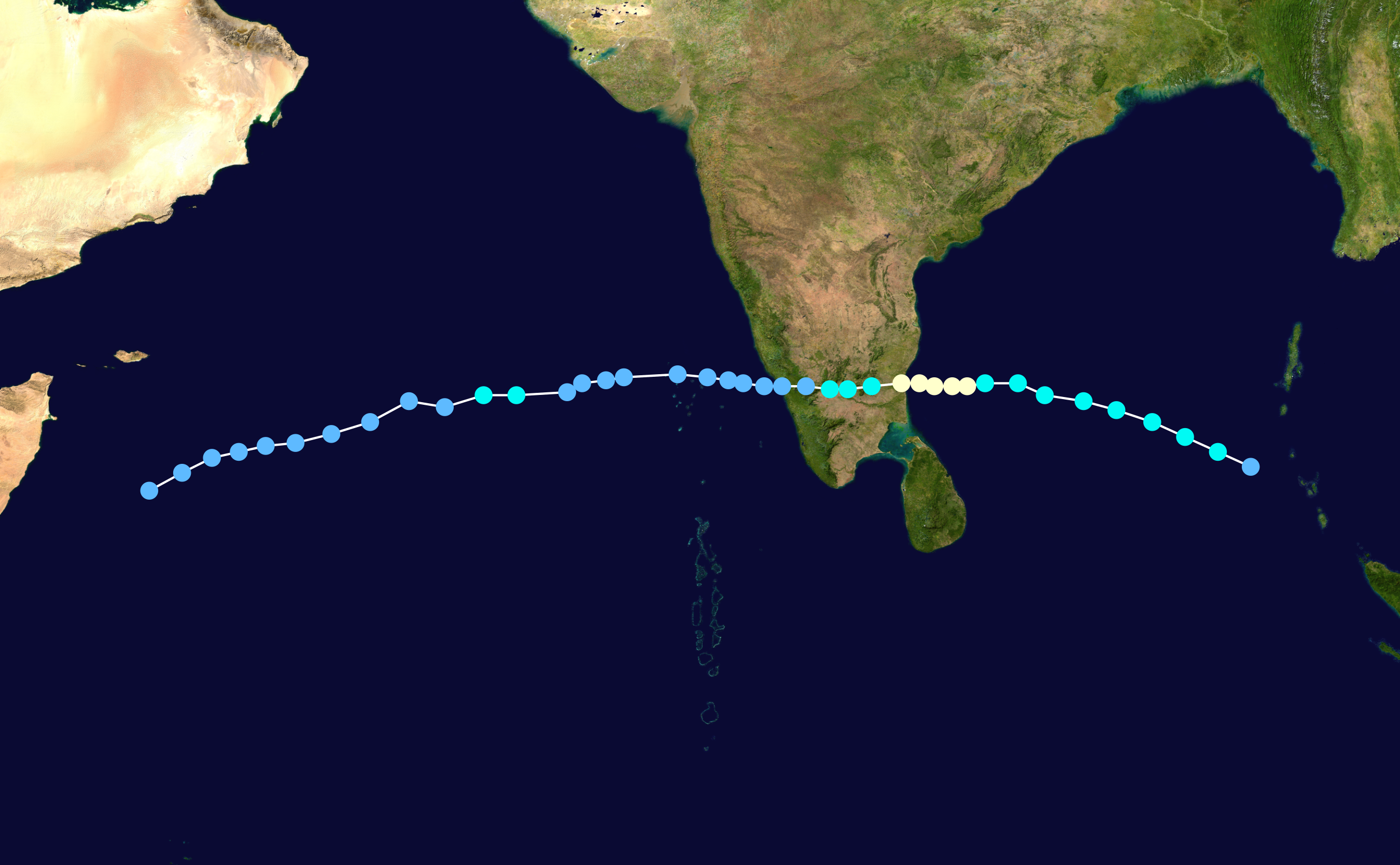
Map plotting the storm's track and intensity, according to the Saffir–Simpson scale Map key Saffir–Simpson scale Tropical depression (≤38 mph, ≤62 km/h) Tropical storm (39–73 mph, 63–118 km/h) Category 1 (74–95 mph, 119–153 km/h) Category 2 (96–110 mph, 154–177 km/h) Category 3 (111–129 mph, 178–208 km/h) Category 4 (130–156 mph, 209–251 km/h) Category 5 (≥157 mph, ≥252 km/h) Unknown Storm type Tropical cyclone Subtropical cyclone Extratropical cyclone, remnant low, tropical disturbance, or monsoon depression

An upper-level low persisted over the Andaman Sea on 24 November. By the next day, a circulation center was present about 370 km (230 mi) west of Thailand, although convection was dislocated to the west due to wind shear. After the thunderstorms concentrated over the center early on 26 November, the IMD classified the system as a depression. A ridge to the north steered the system generally westward. Outflow and convective organization gradually increased, and late on 26 November the JTWC classified it as Tropical Cyclone 03B. As the rainbands organized around the center, the winds increased; the IMD upgraded the system to a cyclonic storm on 27 November, and to a severe and later a very severe cyclonic storm on 28 November.

By 28 November, a 20 km (12 mi)-wide eye was developing, prompting the JTWC to upgrade the storm to the equivalent of a minimal hurricane with winds of 120 km/h (75 mph). By comparison, the IMD estimated peak winds of 190 km/h (120 mph). Wind shear in the region prevented further strengthening, and the storm weakened slightly before making landfall on 29 November in eastern India near Cuddalore. A station there recorded a pressure of 983 mbar (29.0 inHg). The storm rapidly weakened over land, and degenerated into a remnant low on 30 November. The remnants emerged into the eastern Arabian Sea on 1 December, by which time most thunderstorms had dissipated over the deteriorating center. Two days later, the JTWC reissued advisories, based on an increase in outflow and convective organization. This was short-lived, as the thunderstorms soon dwindled, and the JTWC ceased issuing advisories on 5 December. The remnants continued westward without development toward eastern Somalia, before they were last noted on 6 December.

== Impact ==
=== Tamil Nadu ===
Heavy rainfall, peaking at 450 mm (18 in) in Tholudur, spread across Tamil Nadu. During the passage of the eye, residents reported a period of calm lasting about 45 minutes. The main loss was crop damage, uprooting of big trees, and damage to houses. About one thousand Kutcha houses and 14 brick houses were damaged due to strong winds. 10 people lost their lives due to wall/building collapse, and/or electrocution. In the whole state, the roofs of 1000 houses were blown off, 14 houses were washed away, and 300 houses were washed away. Sugarcane in 100 acres, 30.000 Plantain trees, and 50,000 plantain saplings were also destroyed. The winds also damaged about 41,000 houses, about 1,000 of which lost their roofs. Flooding washed away 14 brick buildings, while 300 others were inundated by the sea. Over 1,000 power lines were damaged. Overall, the cyclone caused damages of ₹700 million rupees (US$15 million) and 12 deaths.

==== Cuddalore ====
Over 30,000 trees were uprooted in the Cuddalore district, and 1,000+ electric poles were downed. Four transformers were also damaged. In the Cuddalore district alone, the damages was 20 Indian crores (US$2,702,136).

=== Pondicherry ===
Damages to paddy crops, plantains and coconut plantations were the major loss. About 40,000 Kutcha houses were partially damaged due to the strong winds, and 2 people lost their lives. The damage amounted to 50 Indian crores (US$6,801,865)

== See also ==
- 2000 Sri Lanka cyclone – The next tropical cyclone in the season, that took a similar path.
- Cyclonic Storm Fanoos – A cyclonic storm that took a similar path.
- Cyclone Thane – A very severe cyclonic storm that devastated similar areas.
- Cyclone Vardah – A very severe cyclonic storm that took a similar path.
- Cyclone Gaja – A very severe cyclonic storm that took a similar path.
- Severe Cyclonic Storm ARB 01 – A severe cyclonic storm that took a similar path.
- Extremely Severe Cyclonic Storm BOB 02 – An extremely severe cyclonic storm that devastated similar areas.
