= 2000 North Indian Ocean cyclone season =

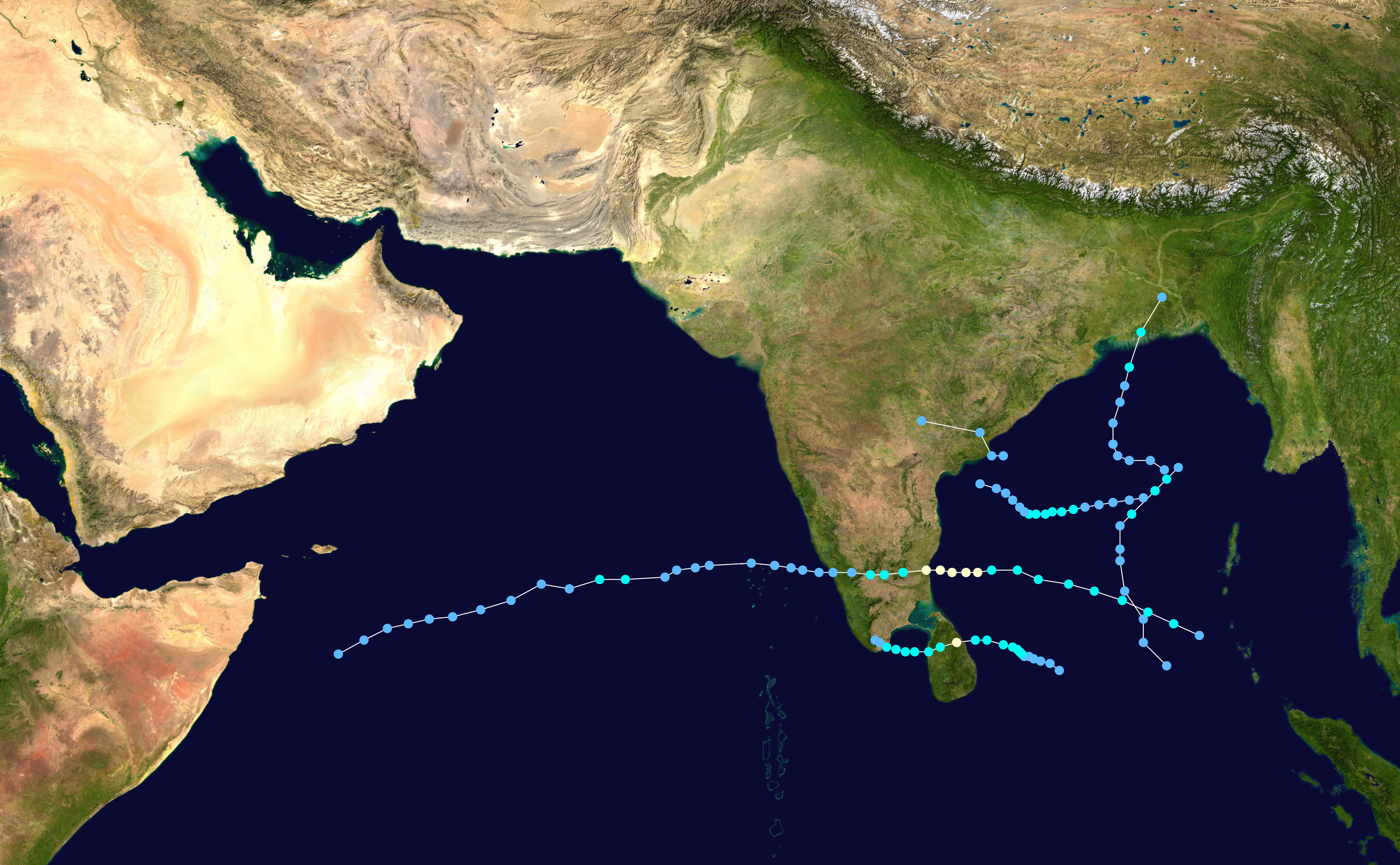
- Season summary map

Seasonal boundaries
- First system formed: March 27, 2000
- Last system dissipated: December 28, 2000

Strongest storm
- Name: BOB 05
  - Maximum winds: 190 km/h (115 mph) (3-minute sustained)
  - Lowest pressure: 958 hPa (mbar)

Seasonal statistics
- Depressions: 6
- Deep depressions: 5
- Cyclonic storms: 5
- Severe cyclonic storms: 2
- Very severe cyclonic storms: 2
- Extremely severe cyclonic storms: 2
- Total fatalities: 229 total
- Total damage: $195 million (2000 USD)

Related articles
- 2000 Atlantic hurricane season; 2000 Pacific hurricane season; 2000 Pacific typhoon season

The 2000 North Indian Ocean cyclone season was fairly quiet compared to the year before, with all of the activity originating in the Bay of Bengal. The basin comprises the Indian Ocean north of the equator, with warnings issued by the India Meteorological Department (IMD) in New Delhi. There were six depressions throughout the year, of which five intensified into cyclonic storms – tropical cyclones with winds of 65 mph (105 km/h) sustained over 3 minutes. Two of the storms strengthened into a Very Severe Cyclonic Storm, which has winds of at least 120 km/h (75 mph), equivalent to a minimal hurricane. The Joint Typhoon Warning Center (JTWC) also tracked storms in the basin on an unofficial basis, estimating winds sustained over 1 minute.

The first storm of the season originated toward the end of March in the Bay of Bengal, one of only five March storms at the time in that body of water. Strong wind shear, which plagued several storms during the season, caused the storm to rapidly dissipate over open waters. In August, a weak depression struck the Indian state of Andhra Pradesh, producing additional flooding after a deluge affected the area in July. There were 131 deaths in Andhra Pradesh, mostly by drownings or collapsed walls, while damage was estimated at ₹7.76 billion rupees (US$170 million ). (Note: All damage totals are valued as of 2000 and originally reported in Indian rupees. Totals converted to United States dollars via the Oanda Corporation website.) There were two short-lived storms in October – one dissipated offshore India in the middle of the month, and the other struck Bangladesh toward the end of the month. The latter storm destroyed many homes and boats, killing 77 in Bangladesh including 52 fishermen, and damage in the Indian state of Meghalaya was estimated at ₹600 million rupees (US$13 million). The strongest storm of the season, 2000 South Indian cyclone, struck Tamil Nadu in November, causing damages of ₹700 million rupees (US$15 million) and 12 deaths. The final storm of the season hit eastern Sri Lanka, leaving 500,000 homeless and killing nine.

== Season summary ==
The India Meteorological Department (IMD) in New Delhi – the official Regional Specialized Meteorological Center for the northern Indian Ocean as recognized by the World Meteorological Organization – issued warnings for tropical cyclones developing in the region, using satellite imagery and surface data to assess and predict storms. The basin's activity is sub-divided between the Arabian Sea and the Bay of Bengal on opposite coasts of India, and is generally split before and after the monsoon season. Storms were also tracked on an unofficial basis by the American-based Joint Typhoon Warning Center.

The season was much less active than the devastating 1999 season. Despite near normal water temperatures over the Arabian Sea, no storms developed in that portion of the basin. Convection was also lower than normal across the Bay of Bengal. The main factor against tropical cyclogenesis was persistently unfavorable wind shear. Overall, there were six depressions, five of which intensified into a cyclonic storm, which has maximum sustained winds of at least 65 km/h (40 mph).

== Systems ==
=== Cyclonic Storm BOB 01 ===
- Cyclonic storm (IMD)
- Tropical storm (SSHWS)
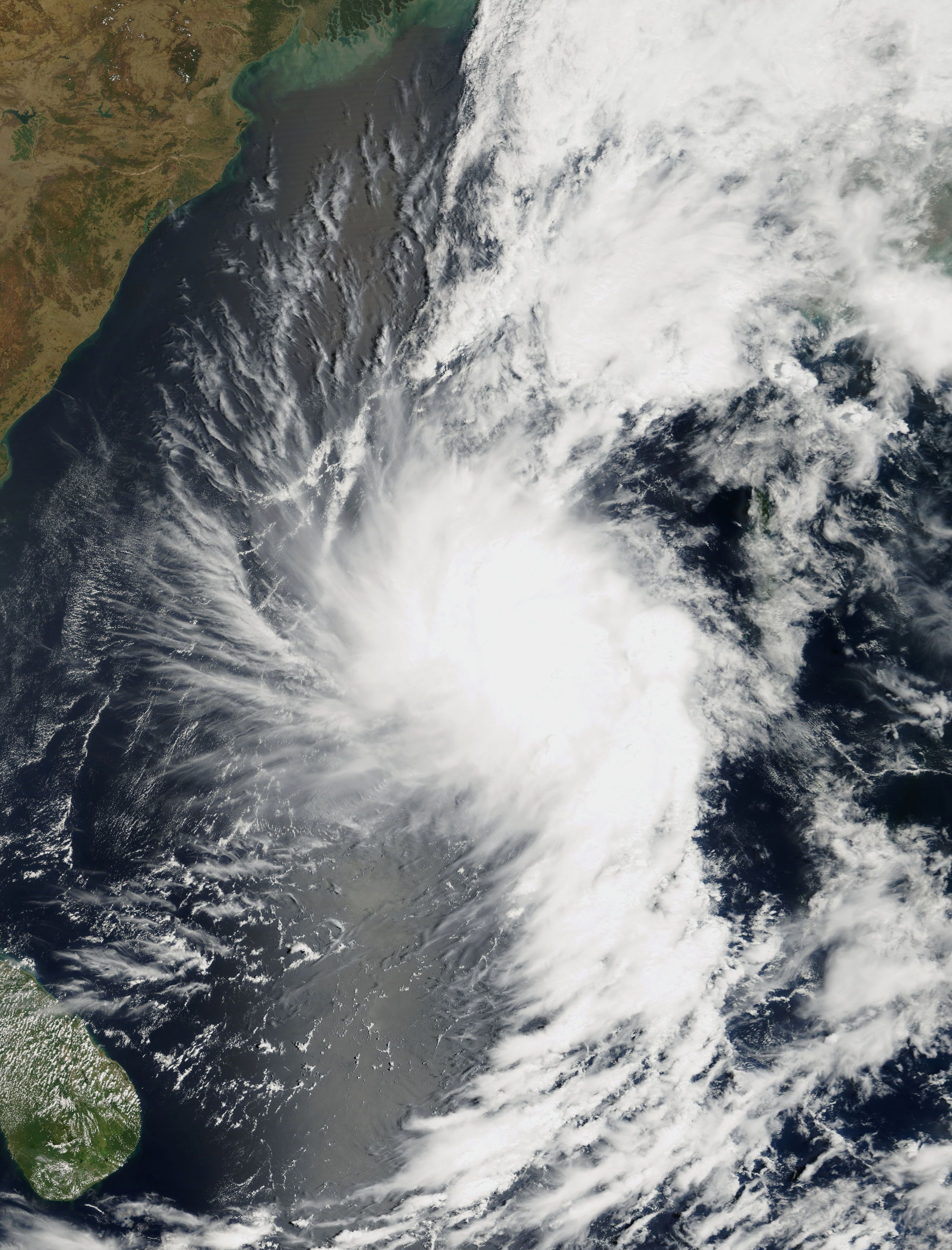
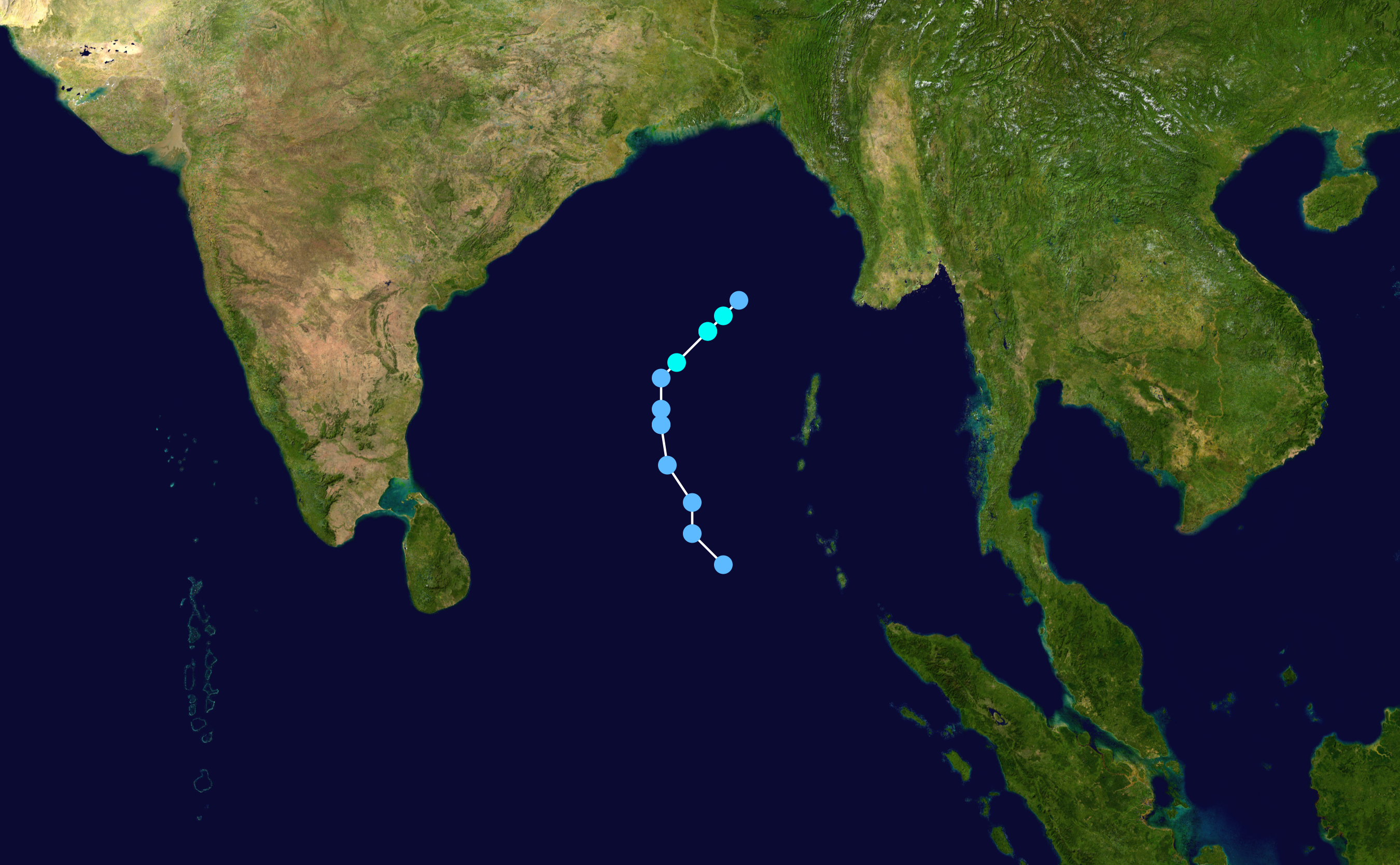
- Duration: March 27 – March 30
- Peak intensity: 85 km/h (50 mph) (3-min); 998 hPa (mbar)

Toward the end of March, an area of convection increased over the southern Bay of Bengal from an active equatorial trough. The system progressed northward, with a weak center between Sri Lanka and Sumatra by March 25. On March 27, a low-pressure area developed, which the IMD designated as a depression by 12:00 UTC. The storm moved to the north-northwest and failed to strengthen at first. However, the JTWC issued a Tropical Cyclone Formation Alert (TCFA) on March 29, a signal of further organization. That day, the IMD upgraded the system to a cyclonic storm, and early on March 30 the storm attained winds of 85 km/h (55 mph) while curving to the north-northeast. Increased wind shear from the westerlies imparted rapid weakening, causing the convection to dwindle to the northeast. According to the IMD, the storm rapidly dissipated on March 30.

A climatological outlier, the storm was one of only five cyclonic storms at the time in the month of March in the Bay of Bengal. It dropped heavy rainfall in the Andaman and Nicobar Islands, reaching 230 mm (9.1 in) on Hut Bay. Although the storm dissipated over the Bay of Bengal according to the IMD, one analysis suggested the storm re-intensified and made landfall on southeastern India between Chennai and Pondicherry on April 1 with winds potentially as high as 110 km/h (70 mph). The storm did not receive advisories from the JTWC.

=== Depression BOB 02 ===
- Depression (IMD)
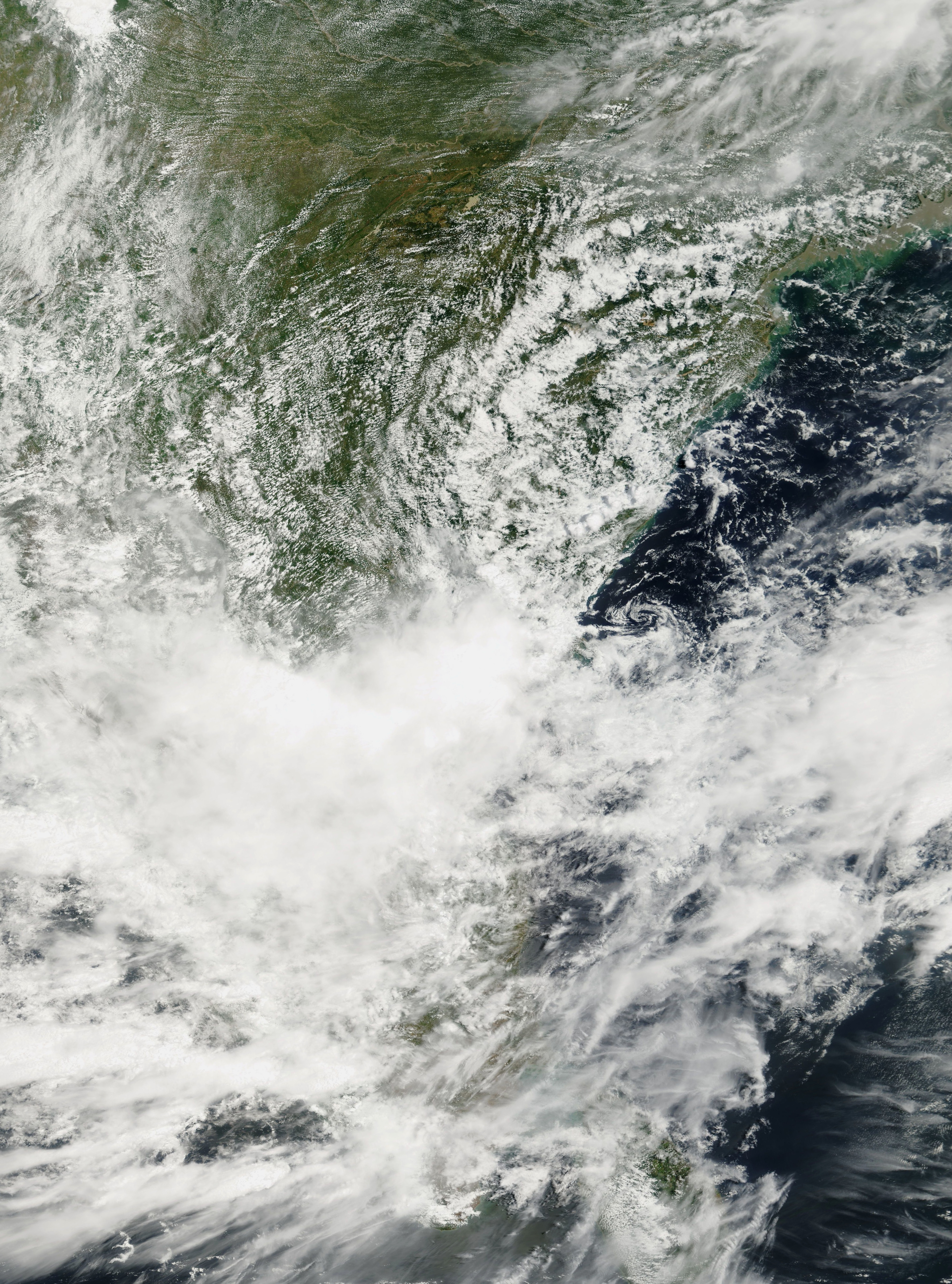
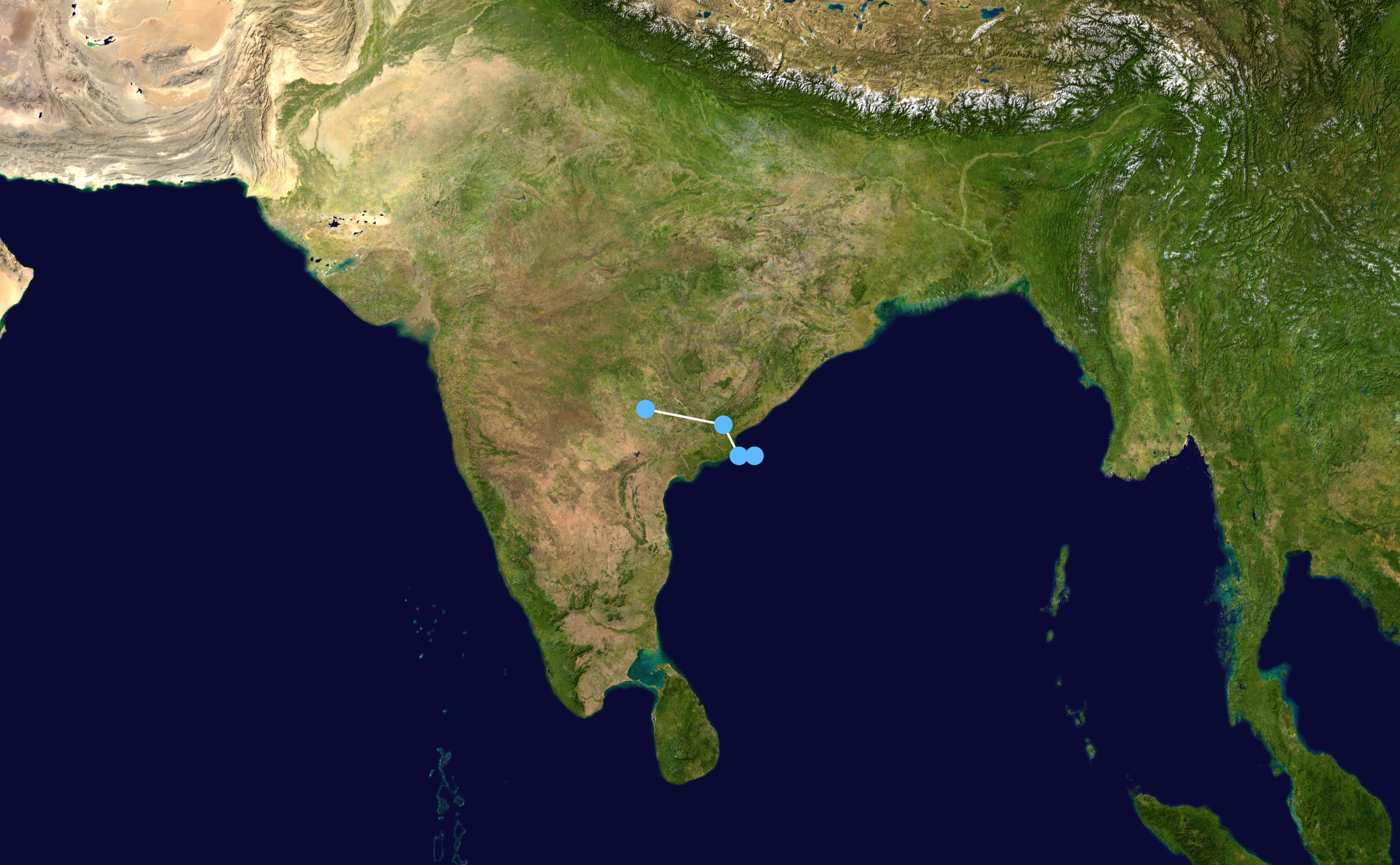
- Duration: August 23 – August 24
- Peak intensity: 45 km/h (30 mph) (3-min); 994 hPa (mbar)

In late August, the monsoon trough spawned a series of disturbances in the Bay of Bengal, including one that developed on August 19 off the Odisha coast. It persisted and gradually organized, becoming a well-marked low-pressure area on August 22. On the following day, the system became a depression, located about 150 km (90 mi) south-southeast of Visakhapatnam, Andhra Pradesh. Moving westward, the system soon moved ashore near Kakinada without intensifying beyond winds of 45 km/h (30 mph), and quickly weakened into a remnant low on August 24. The low continued westward, eventually dissipating over Gujarat on August 28.

While moving ashore, the depression produced torrential rainfall across Andhra Pradesh. The capital city of Hyderabad recorded 240 mm (9.4 in) of rainfall on August 24. During the last week of August, the state recorded the highest precipitation in 46 years, which overflowed lakes and flooded several towns. The rains followed deadly flooding in July and preceded another flood event in September. About 98,000 people evacuated their houses to 189 shelters, aided by the military, including about 35,000 people in Hyderabad and neighboring Secunderabad. Thousands were forced to ride out the floods on their roofs, and helicopters airdropped food and relief goods. The depression damaged 27,026 houses and destroyed another 8,651 in 2,886 towns or villages. Widespread irrigation systems were damaged, and 177,987 ha (439,820 acres) of crops were lost, in addition to 5,368 killed cattle. Traffic was disrupted after 7,435 km (4,620 mi) of roads were damaged, impacting 2,389 roads. The rains also marred the electrical system, with 6,000 power lines damaged. There were 131 deaths in Andhra Pradesh, mostly by drownings or collapsed walls, while damage was estimated at ₹7.76 billion rupees (US$170 million).

=== Cyclonic Storm BOB 03 ===
- Cyclonic storm (IMD)
- Tropical storm (SSHWS)
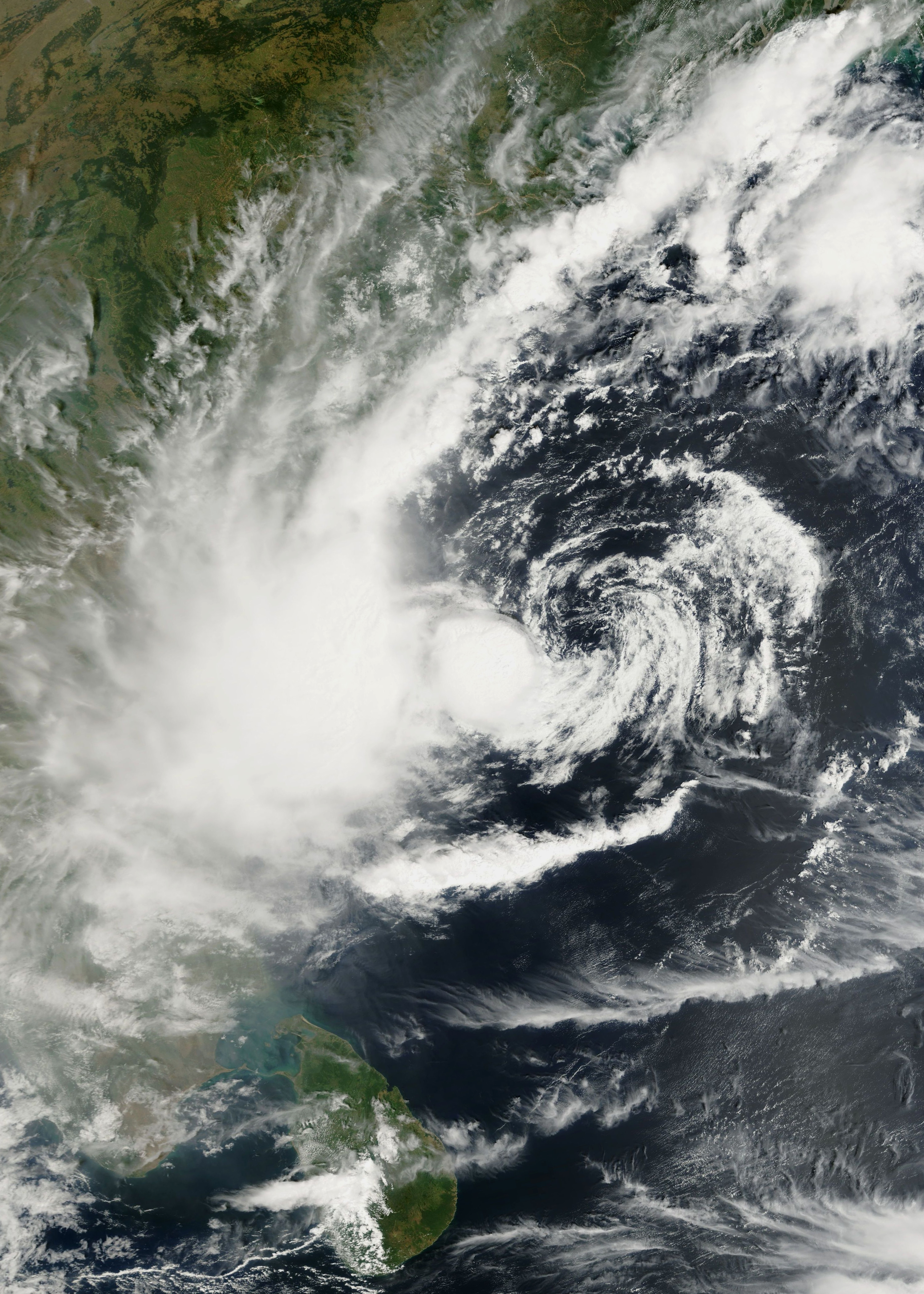
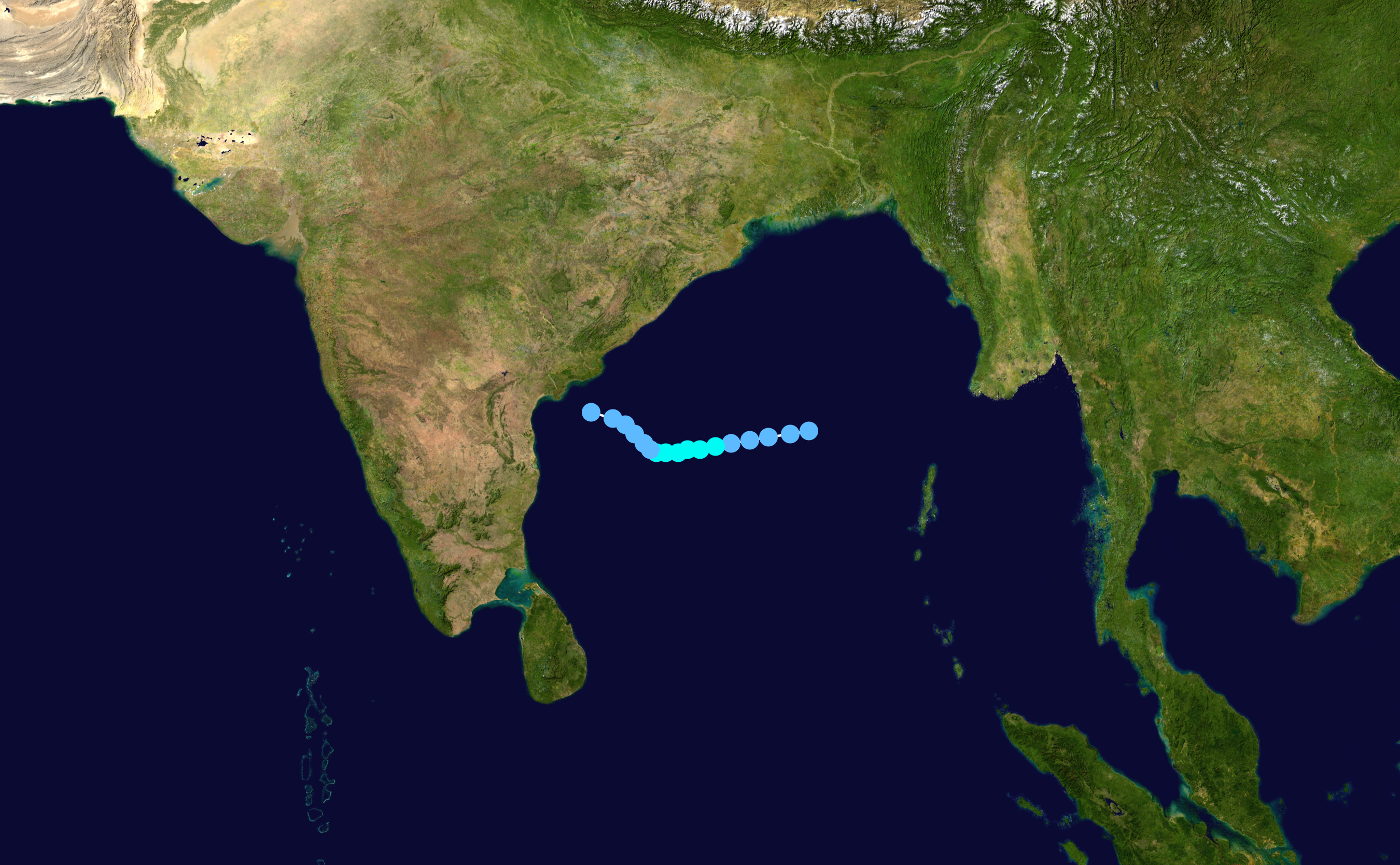
- Duration: October 15 – October 19
- Peak intensity: 65 km/h (40 mph) (3-min); 996 hPa (mbar)

The active monsoon spawned a low-pressure area in the central Bay of Bengal on October 12. The system had an area of convection about 925 km (575 mi) southeast of Kolkata, which moved slowly westward. By October 14, there was an exposed circulation center east of the convection, although it organized enough for the IMD to classify it as a well-marked low-pressure area. On October 15, the agency classified it as a depression as the circulation moved closer to the thunderstorms. Later that day, the JTWC issued a TCFA and the IMD upgraded it to a deep depression, based on improving outflow and organization. On October 16, a nearby ship reported winds of 65 km/h (40 mph), and that day the JTWC began tracking the system as Tropical Cyclone 01B. Early the next day, the IMD followed suit and upgraded the deep depression to a cyclonic storm, estimating peak winds of 65 km/h (40 mph). However, the system persisted in an area of weak to moderate wind shear, preventing further development. The circulation became exposed from the convection, and the wind shear increased. On October 18, the IMD downgraded the system to a deep depression, and the storm dissipated on the next day as it approached the eastern coast of India.

While the storm was active, officials issued warnings for fishermen not to venture out at sea. In Odisha, residents organized public prayers in hopes of avoiding a repeat of the deadly 1999 Odisha cyclone. Although it dissipated offshore, the storm brought rainfall to Andhra Pradesh and Odisha, but no damage was reported. Strong winds associated with the system killed 100 pelican chicks in Srikakulam after blowing them out of their nests.

=== Cyclonic Storm BOB 04 ===
- Cyclonic storm (IMD)
- Tropical storm (SSHWS)
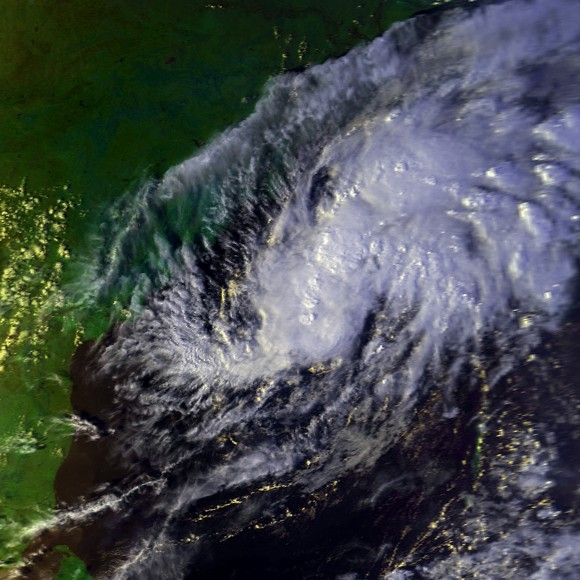
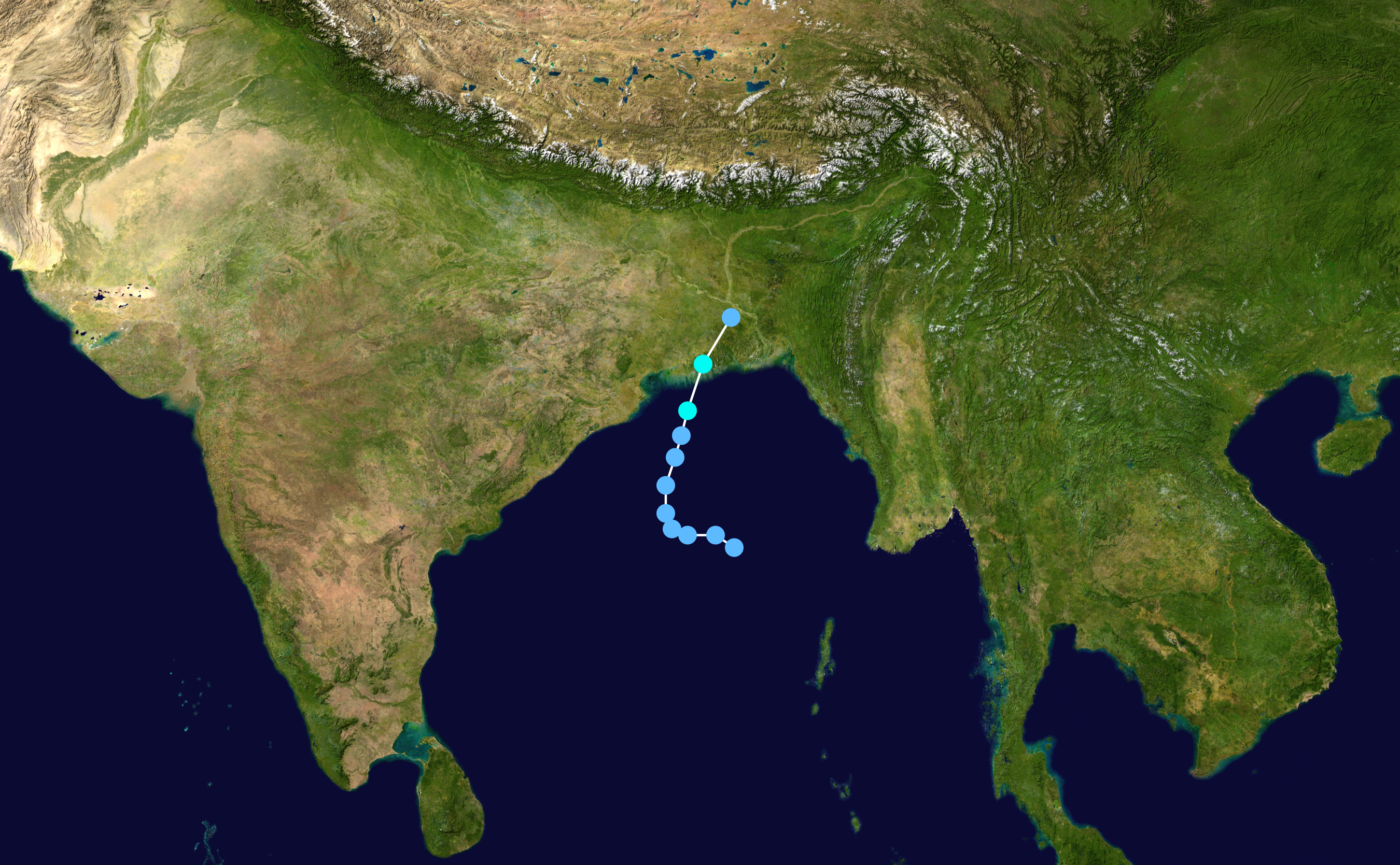
- Duration: October 25 – October 29
- Peak intensity: 65 km/h (40 mph) (3-min); 998 hPa (mbar)

Similar to the previous storm, the active monsoon trough spawned a low-pressure area over the Andaman Sea on October 24. There was a weak center that had good outflow. On October 25, the IMD classified the system as a depression about 925 km (575 mi) southeast of Kolkata. The system moved to the northwest and developed more convection close to the center, although the thunderstorms were intermittent. Turning more to the north, the depression intensified into a deep depression and later cyclonic storm on October 27, reaching peak winds of 65 km/h (40 mph); the JTWC also classified it as Tropical Cyclone 02B. That day, the wind shear increased, although the convection was able to increase over the center and organize into a comma-shaped rainband. Early on October 28, the storm made landfall in southern Bangladesh near Mongla, by which time the wind shear had displaced much of the convection to the northeast. It rapidly weakened over land, degenerating into a remnant low over northern Bangladesh early on October 29.

The storm dropped heavy rainfall, both in the Andaman and Nicobar Islands as well as northeastern India. In Meghalaya state in northeastern India, the storm damaged hundreds of houses, leaving thousands homeless. Many livestock were lost, and crops were decimated. Damage in Meghalaya was estimated at ₹600 million rupees (US$13 million). While moving ashore in Bangladesh, the cyclone produced a storm tide of 1.2–2.1 m (4–7 ft), which wrecked hundreds of boats, and left 100 fishermen missing despite forewarning; by a day after the storm, only eight fishermen were rescued from four boats, with 52 fishermen killed. Heavy rainfall, totaling 119 mm (4.7 in) in Khulna, overflowed rivers and flooded houses after previous deadly flooding in September. High floods and wind gusts up to 100 km/h (60 mph) damaged homes in Satkhira and Jessore districts, forcing thousands to evacuate to storm shelters. The storm knocked over trees, wrecked roads, and destroyed rice fields along its path through the low-lying country. On land in Bangladesh, 25 people died due to the storm, with over 500 injured. After the storm, local governments provided relief goods to the worst affected areas.

=== Extremely Severe Cyclonic Storm BOB 05 ===
- Extremely severe cyclonic storm (IMD)
- Category 1 tropical cyclone (SSHWS)
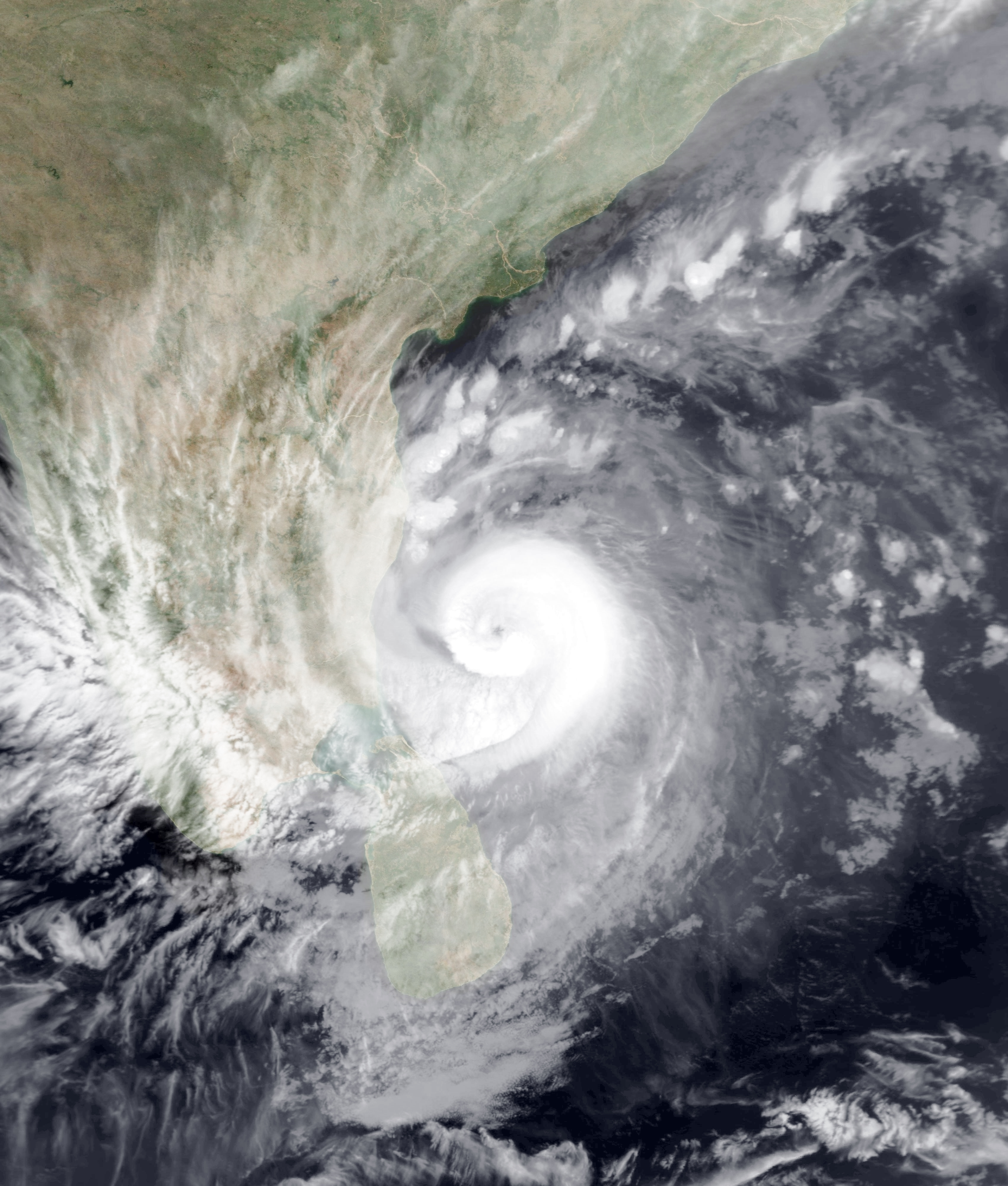
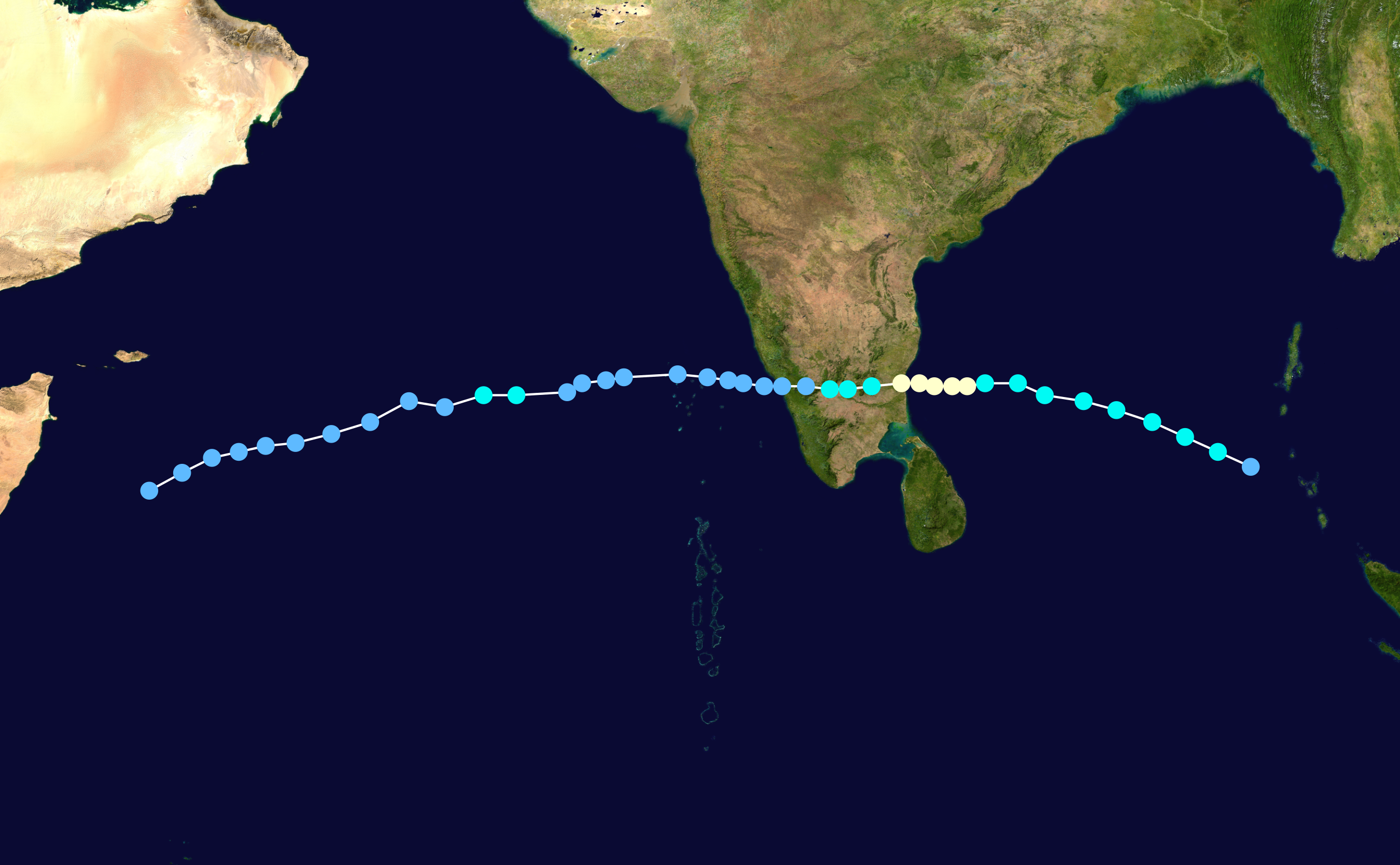
- Duration: November 26 – November 30
- Peak intensity: 190 km/h (115 mph) (3-min); 958 hPa (mbar)

An upper-level low persisted over the Andaman Sea on November 24. By the next day, a circulation center was present about 370 km (230 mi) west of Thailand, although convection was dislocated to the west due to wind shear. After the thunderstorms concentrated over the center early on November 26, the IMD classified the system as a depression. A ridge to the north steered the system generally westward. Outflow and convective organization gradually increased, and late on November 26 the JTWC classified it as Tropical Cyclone 03B. As the rainbands organized around the center, the winds increased; the IMD upgraded the system to a cyclonic storm on November 27, and to a severe and later a very severe cyclonic storm on November 28.

By November 28, a 20 km (12 mi) wide eye was developing, prompting the JTWC to upgrade the storm to the equivalent of a minimal hurricane with winds of 120 km/h (75 mph). By comparison, the IMD estimated peak winds of 190 km/h (120 mph). Wind shear in the region prevented further strengthening, and the storm weakened slightly before making landfall on November 29 in eastern India near Cuddalore. A station there recorded a pressure of 983 mbar (29.0 inHg). The storm rapidly weakened over land, and degenerated into a remnant low on November 30. The remnants emerged into the eastern Arabian Sea on December 1, by which time most thunderstorms had dissipated over the deteriorating center. Two days later, the JTWC reissued advisories, based on an increase in outflow and convective organization. This was short-lived, as the thunderstorms soon dwindled, and the JTWC ceased issuing advisories on December 5. The remnants continued westward without development toward eastern Somalia.

Heavy rainfall, peaking at 450 mm (18 in) in Tholudur, spread across Tamil Nadu. During the passage of the eye, residents reported a period of calm lasting about 45 minutes. Across Tamil Nadu, high winds knocked over 30,000 trees, and many coconuts, plantains, and rice paddy farms were damaged in nearby Puducherry. The winds also damaged about 41,000 houses, about 1,000 of which lost their roofs. Flooding washed away 14 brick buildings, while 300 others were inundated by the sea. Over 1,000 power lines were damaged. Overall damages were estimated at ₹700 million rupees (US$15 million), and there were 12 deaths.

=== Extremely Severe Cyclonic Storm BOB 06 ===
- Extremely severe cyclonic storm (IMD)
- Category 1 tropical cyclone (SSHWS)
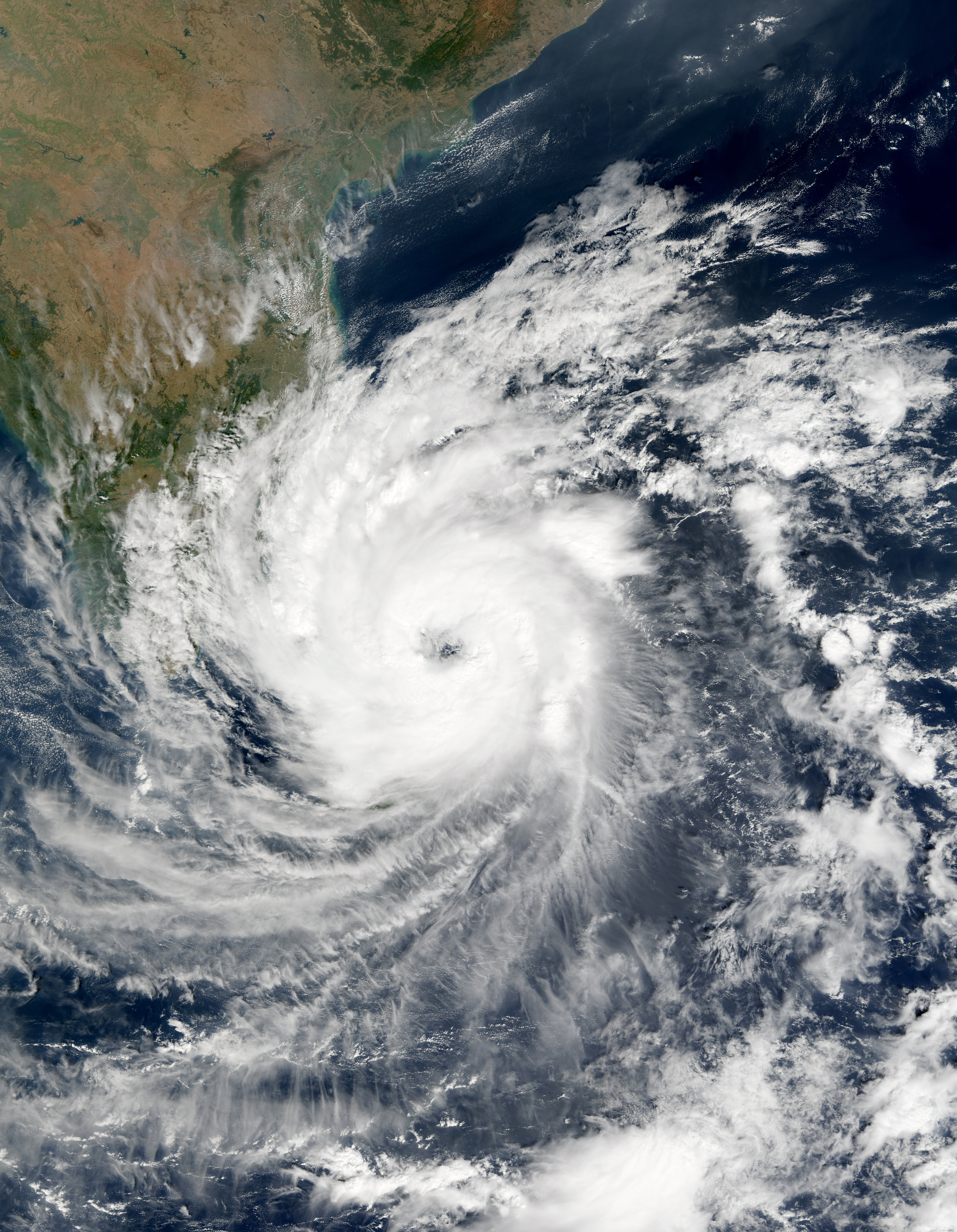
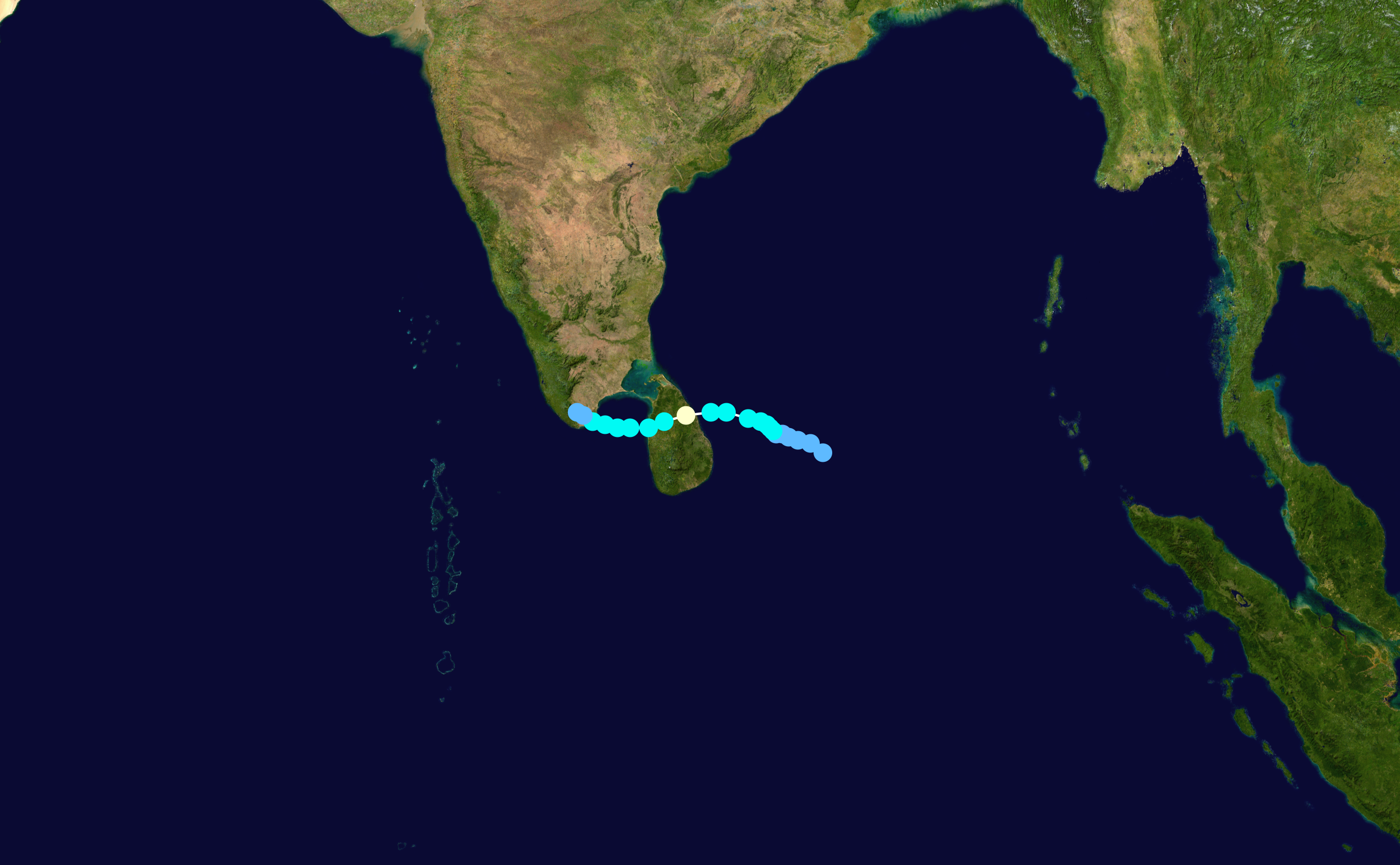
- Duration: December 23 – December 28
- Peak intensity: 165 km/h (105 mph) (3-min); 970 hPa (mbar)

A near-equatorial trough spawned a low-pressure area on December 22 in the central Bay of Bengal. A circulation within the system developed into a depression on December 23 about 500 km (310 mi) east-southeast of Sri Lanka. A low-latitude storm, the system organized while moving slowly westward. On December 24, the depression strengthened into a deep depression, and the following day into a cyclonic storm, the same day that the JTWC classified it as Tropical Cyclone 04B. An eye developed in the center of the blossoming convection, and the system rapidly intensified into a very severe cyclonic storm on December 26. According to the IMD, the cyclone attained peak winds of 165 km/h (105 mph), and made landfall at that intensity along eastern Sri Lanka near Trincomalee around 12:00 UTC on December 26. The JTWC assessed lower winds of 120 km/h (75 mph). Weakening quickly over land, the storm emerged into the Gulf of Mannar on December 27 and failed to restrengthen. Later that day, it made a second landfall in extreme southern India near Thoothukudi as a cyclonic storm. Continuing westward, the system emerged into the Arabian Sea on December 28 as a depression and degenerated into a remnant low. On the next day, the remnant low merged with a trough and spread rainfall northward through India.

The strongest storm to threaten Sri Lanka since 1992, the cyclone produced estimated wind gusts of 175 km/h (110 mph) near where it moved ashore. About 500,000 people were left homeless, after the winds destroyed the roofs of many houses. One entire fishing village was destroyed, and about 20,000 ha (49,000 acres) of rice fields were wrecked. While crossing the country, the cyclone dropped between 4 and 8 inches (100 to 200 mm) of precipitation, compounding the effects of severe monsoonal flooding from the previous month. There were nine deaths in the country. Later, the storm brought heavy rainfall to southern India, with a peak 24‑hour total of 180 mm (7.1 in) in Nagapattinam. The storm damaged 480 houses and wrecked 95 fishing boats.

== Season effects ==
This is a table of all storms in the 2000 North Indian Ocean cyclone season. It mentions all of the season's storms and their names, duration, peak intensities (according to the IMD storm scale), damage, and death totals. Damage and death totals include the damage and deaths caused when that storm was a precursor wave or extratropical low, and all of the damage figures are in 2000 USD.

Name	Dates	Peak intensity			Areas affected	Damage (USD)	Deaths	Refs
Name	Dates	Category	Wind speed	Pressure	Areas affected	Damage (USD)	Deaths	Refs
BOB 01	March 27–30	Cyclonic Storm	85 km/h (55 mph)	998 hPa (29.47 inHg)	Andaman and Nicobar Islands, Myanmar, Bangladesh	Minimal	None	
BOB 02	August 23–24	Depression	45 km/h (30 mph)	994 hPa (29.35 inHg)	Western India	$170 million	131	
BOB 03	October 15–19	Cyclonic Storm	85 km/h (55 mph)	996 hPa (29.41 inHg)	Western India, Gujarat	Moderate	None	
BOB 04	October 25–29	Cyclonic Storm	85 km/h (55 mph)	998 hPa (29.47 inHg)	Bangladesh, Odisha, West Bengal	$13 million	77	
BOB 05	November 26–30	Extremely Severe Cyclonic Storm	190 km/h (120 mph)	958 hPa (28.29 inHg)	Western India, Somalia	>$12 million	12	
BOB 06	December 23–28	Extremely Severe Cyclonic Storm	165 km/h (105 mph)	970 hPa (28.64 inHg)	Sri Lanka, India	Minimal	9	
Season aggregates
6 systems	March 27 – December 28		190 km/h (120 mph)	958 hPa (28.29 inHg)		>$195 million	229	

== See also ==
- 2000 Atlantic hurricane season
- 2000 Pacific hurricane season
- 2000 Pacific typhoon season
- South-West Indian Ocean cyclone seasons: 1999–2000, 2000–01
- Australian region cyclone seasons: 1999–2000, 2000–01
- South Pacific cyclone seasons: 1999–2000, 2000–01
