= Cyclone Burevi =

North Indian Ocean cyclone in 2020

Cyclonic Storm Burevi
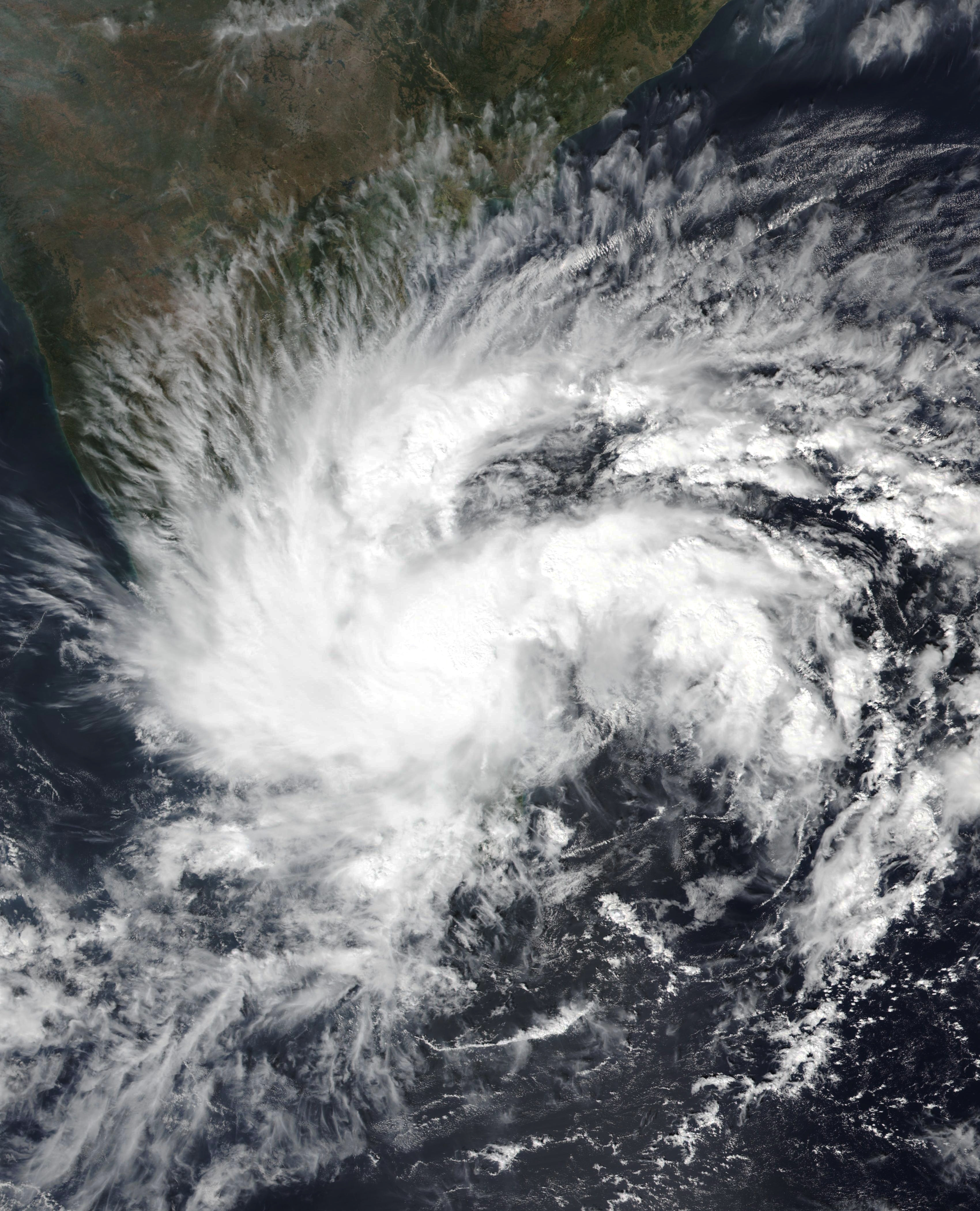
- Cyclone Burevi near peak intensity on 2 December

Meteorological history
- Formed: 30 November 2020
- Dissipated: 5 December 2020

Cyclonic storm
- 3-minute sustained (IMD)
- Highest winds: 85 km/h (50 mph)
- Lowest pressure: 996 hPa (mbar); 29.41 inHg

Tropical storm
- 1-minute sustained (SSHWS/JTWC)
- Highest winds: 85 km/h (50 mph)
- Lowest pressure: 996 hPa (mbar); 29.41 inHg

Overall effects
- Fatalities: 11
- Missing: 6
- Areas affected: Sri Lanka, Tamil Nadu, Kerala
- IBTrACS
- Part of the 2020 North Indian Ocean cyclone season

Cyclonic Storm Burevi (Note: The name Burevi (Dhivehi: ބުރެވި; [buɾeʋi]) was contributed by the Maldives and refers to the black mangrove (Lumnitzera racemosa) in Dhivehi.) was a weak tropical cyclone which made landfall in Sri Lanka, becoming the first to do so since a depression in 2014, and brought minimal impact to Southern India in December 2020. The ninth depression and fifth named storm of the 2020 North Indian Ocean cyclone season, Burevi originated from a low-pressure area which formed on 28 November. The system gradually became a depression on 30 November, with the JTWC issuing a TCFA soon after. The depression then was upgraded into Cyclone Burevi the following day. Burevi slowly intensified reaching its peak intensity on 2 December, just before making landfall in Sri Lanka. Burevi then weakened, entering the Gulf of Mannar the next day. Burevi proceeded to dissipate after stalling on 5 December.

Upon formation, a Cyclone Alert was issued for Sri Lanka, South Tamil Nadu, and South Kerala. More than 75,000 people were evacuated ahead of the storm in Sri Lanka. In India, a red message was issued by the IMD. A red alert was also issued for parts of Kerala. In Sri Lanka, 57 houses were destroyed with 2,753 others being damaged. According to the European Civil Protection and Humanitarian Aid Operations, 10,336 people were displaced. Flooding occurred in Tamil Nadu and Puducherry, inundating the Chidambaram Nataraja Temple. Crop damage also occurred in the area. However, the state of Kerala was spared from the worst of the storm. Burevi left 11 people dead with 5 others missing as of 6 December 2020. Damage is still being calculated.

== Meteorological history ==
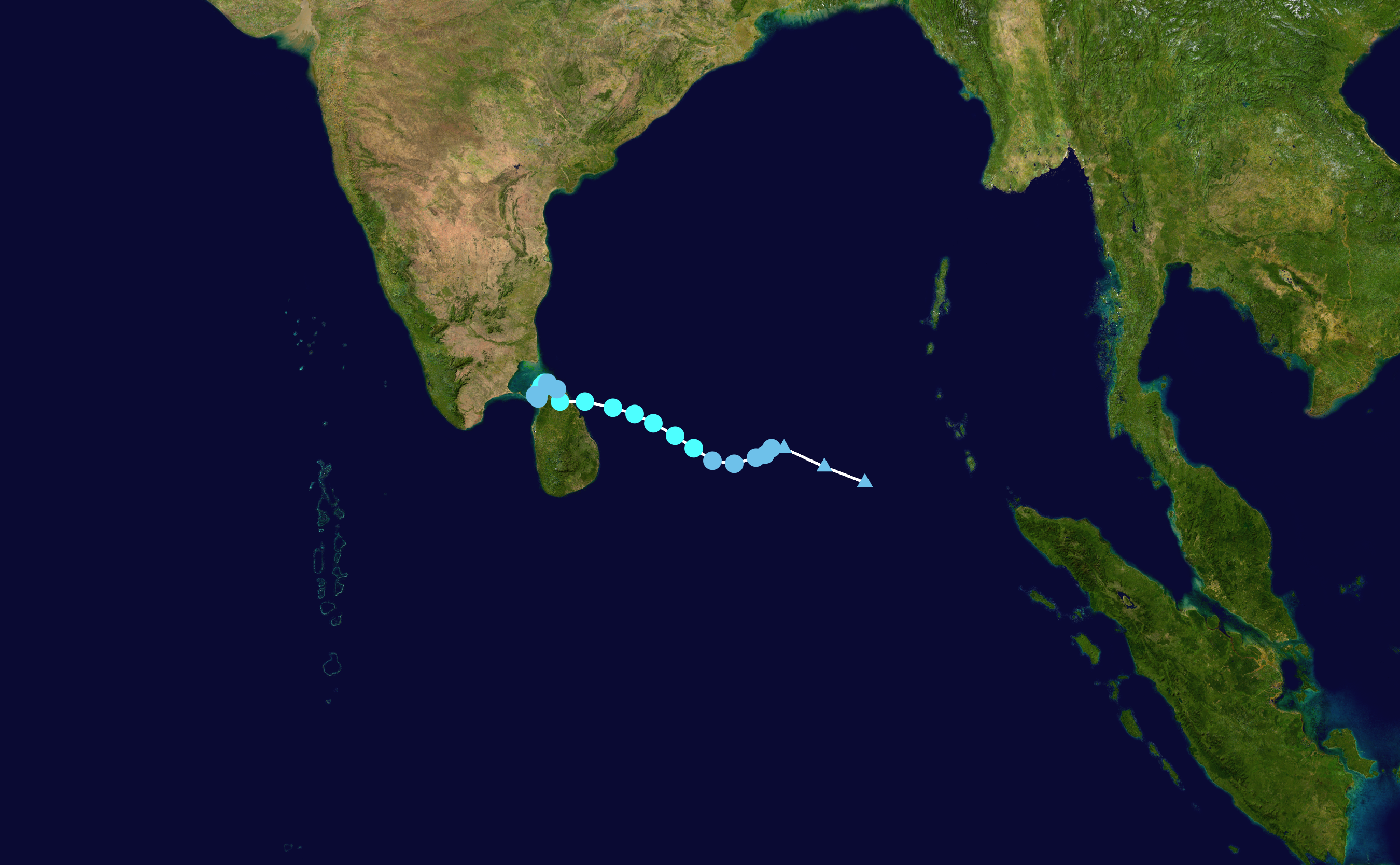
Map plotting the storm's track and intensity, according to the Saffir–Simpson scale Map key Saffir–Simpson scale Tropical depression (≤38 mph, ≤62 km/h) Tropical storm (39–73 mph, 63–118 km/h) Category 1 (74–95 mph, 119–153 km/h) Category 2 (96–110 mph, 154–177 km/h) Category 3 (111–129 mph, 178–208 km/h) Category 4 (130–156 mph, 209–251 km/h) Category 5 (≥157 mph, ≥252 km/h) Unknown Storm type Tropical cyclone Subtropical cyclone Extratropical cyclone, remnant low, tropical disturbance, or monsoon depression

On 28 November, a low-pressure area formed off the coast of Aceh. It gradually intensified into a depression on 30 November. The JTWC then issued a Tropical Cyclone Formation Alert on the system, that same day. At 03:00 UTC on 1 December, the depression was upgraded into a deep depression. At 15:00 UTC, both the IMD and JTWC upgraded it to a cyclonic storm and tropical storm respectively and it was named Burevi, the fifth named storm of the season. The name was initially suggested by the Maldives. At this time, microwave imagery showed well-defined convective banding wrapping tightly around the low-level circulation (LLCC). At 15:00 UTC on 2 December, Burevi reached its peak intensity with 1-minute sustained winds of around 85 km/h (55 mph) and a barometric pressure of 996 mbar (29.4 inHg). Shortly afterwards, Burevi made landfall along the east coast of Sri Lanka according to the Sri Lanka's Department of Meteorology.

After weakening over Sri Lanka, Burevi exited into the Gulf of Mannar, early on 3 December. However, Burevi slowed down quickly as it became stuck in a col between two subtropical ridges on 4 December; thus the system stalled just west of Sri Lanka while weakening back down to the equivalent of a tropical depression, due to increasing vertical wind shear. At 06:00 UTC on 5 December, Burevi degenerated into an Post-tropical cyclone.

== Preparations and impacts ==
=== Sri Lanka ===
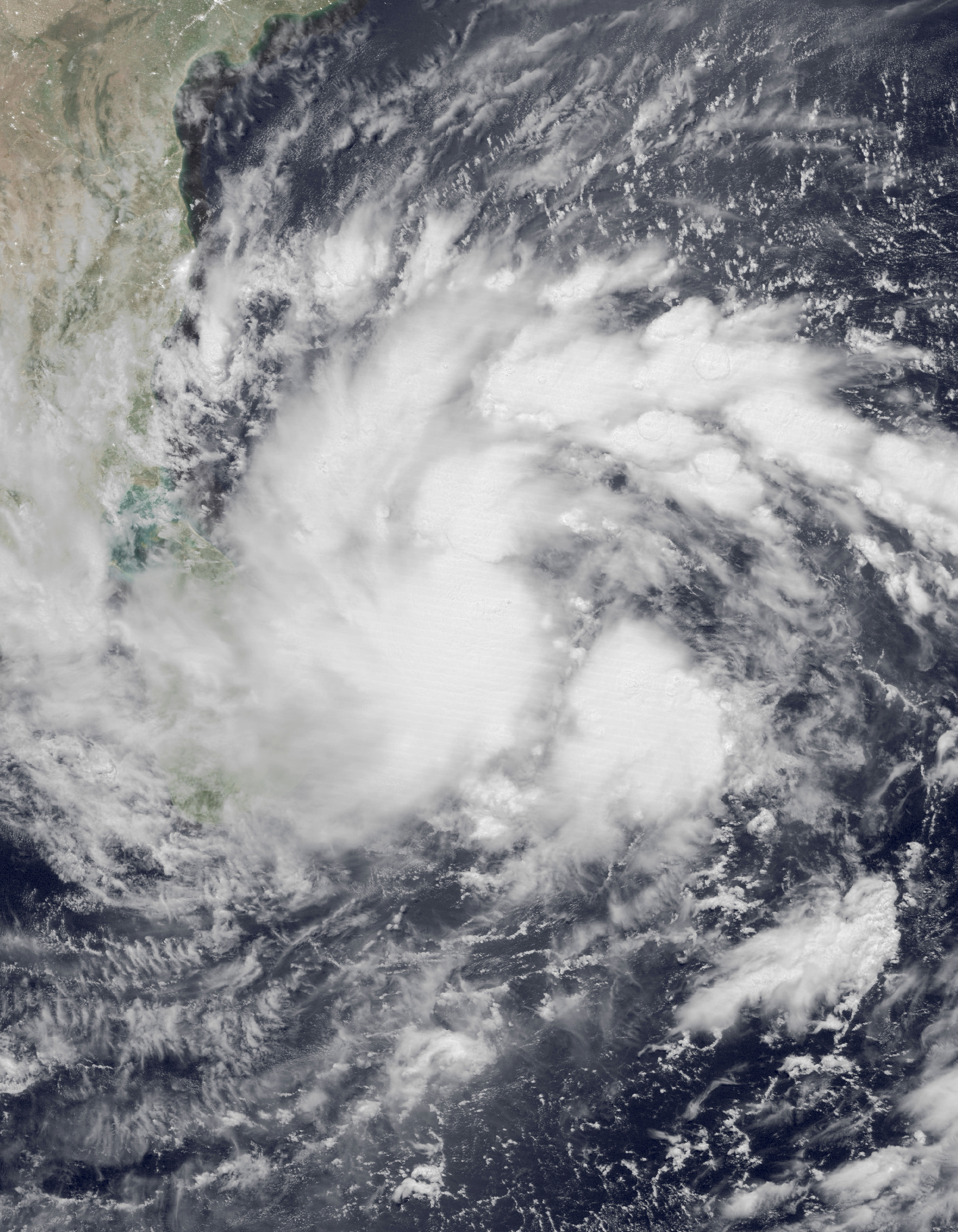
Burevi approaching Sri Lanka on 1 December

In advance of Burevi, a red alert was imposed by the Sri Lanka Department of Meteorology. Sri Lanka's meteorological department also warned of storm surge, flash flooding, and damage to homes and power lines. A red alert was also issued. Fishing and naval activities were suspended in Sri Lanka starting 2 December, according to the IMD. The IMD also issued storm surge warnings for the East Coast of Sri Lanka. More than 75,000 people were evacuated along the east coast of the country, with 237 relief centers opening in the district of Trincomalee. Schools were shut down in the Northern Province and Eastern Province until at least 4 December due to the storm. The Director-General of the Disaster Management Centre said that 50 shelters were opened in each district of the North and East provinces.

At least two people died, six people were injured, 99 houses were fully destroyed 3,486 houses were partially damaged and a total of 95,734 persons affected by Cyclone Burevi, including 79,564 in Jaffna alone, Sri Lanka's Disaster Management Centre said. The 2 fatalities were residents of the Chankanai and Chavakachcheri areas of Jaffna district. Rain continued to lash Jaffna after the centre of the cyclone moved out of the island, leaving many areas flooded. Jaffna continued to experience heavy rains of 193.3 millimetres as late as 6 December. By the afternoon of 4 December, 68,958 persons from 20,814 families were already affected. Sri Lanka Navy said dozens of families were displaced in Punkudutivu and Iranativu islands in Jaffna who were relocated to safer places and given relief supplies. More than 12,200 people from 3,500 families were impacted earlier. 4 fishermen went missing during the storm, including 1 from Jaffna and 3 from Mannar. 4 people were injured in the town of Valvettithurai. Burevi produced heavy rainfall over Sri Lanka, peaking at 203.5 mm (8.01 in) in Alampil. However, Pradeeep Kodippili, the assistant director of Sri Lanka's Disaster Management Centre stated that, "District disaster management units are reporting that no major damage has been caused by the cyclone." The city of Trincomalee was estimated to have been the hardest hit in Sri Lanka. According to European Civil Protection and Humanitarian Aid Operations, 10,336 people were displaced and an additional person was missing.

=== India ===
Burevi dropping torrential rainfall over southern India from 4–5 December

On 2 December, the IMD issued an orange message for southern Tamil Nadu and southern Kerala. This was then upgraded into a red message by 3 December. 26 NDRF teams were deployed in both Tamil Nadu and Kerala, ahead of the storm. 63 relief centers were opened in the Thoothukudi district where 30,000 sandbags were prepared to stop breaches in irrigation tanks. The IMD issued a No. 3 Hazard warning for the Pamban port due to high winds on 3 December. Schools were forced to close in Puducherry on 4 December, due to Burevi. On 30 November, a red alert was issued for the Kerala districts of Thiruvananthapuram, Alappuzha, Kollam, and Pathanamthitta. While an orange alert was put in effect for Kottayam, Idukki, and Ernakulam. Authorities in the area opened more than 2,000 relief camps, while banning fishing from 3–6 December. In the districts of Thiruvananthapuram, Alappuzha, Kollam, Pathanamthitta, and Idukki, a public holiday was declared for 4 December. The Trivandrum International Airport was also forced to shut down for part of that day.

In Tamil Nadu, 9 people were killed due to Burevi. The Wellington Dam's water level reached above the highest flood stage. Flooding isolated many villages from the capital, Chennai. The Chidambaram Nataraja Temple in the district of Cuddalore was flooded after receiving 340 mm (13 in) of precipitation. In Barathampattam, agricultural land was flooded, causing crop damage.

In Puducherry, precipitation amounts of 138 mm (5.4 in) were recorded as of 4 December 2020. In Pondicherry, the power supply of the city was briefly cut off on 3 December. In the area, damage to trees, crops, and huts was reported. Although Burevi brought torrential rainfall to Kerala, the worst of the cyclone missed the state.

== Aftermath ==
=== Sri Lanka ===
As the storm moved over Sri Lanka, Vavuniya District Secretary, S.M. Saman Bandulasena, stated that arrangements and funds had been made to provide immediate relief following the storm. UNICEF delivered 1,000 tarps, 10 family tents, 10 water pumps, and water purification tablets to the government of the country. The Sri Lanka Navy provided cooked meals, dry ration, sanitary facilities, and health facilities to impacted areas.

=== India ===
A central team was sent to Puducherry to assess damage from both Burevi and Nivar, which hit the area a little over a week earlier. In Kerala, people forced to evacuate to relief camps were allowed to return to their homes on 5 December.

== See also ==
- Tropical cyclones in 2020
- 2000 Sri Lanka cyclone
- Cyclone Ockhi
- Cyclone Gaja
- Cyclone Nivar
- 1964 Rameswaram cyclone
- 2020 Medan floods, caused by a wind convergence created by Burevi
