= 2020 Indonesia and Malaysia floods =

Flash floods in Medan, December

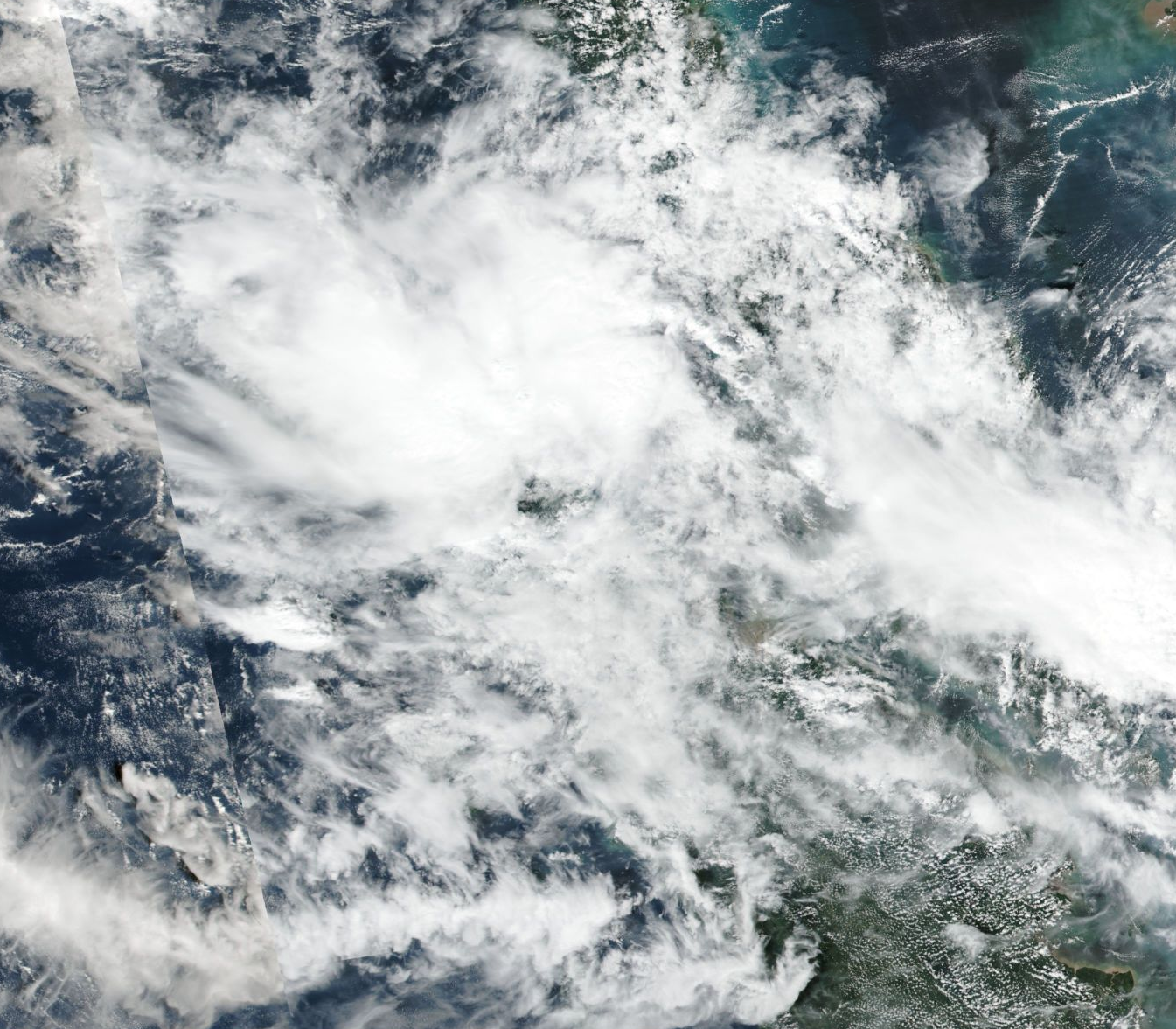
- Satellite view of the wind convergence on 4 December
- Date: 3 December 2020—8 December 2020
- Location: Indonesia, Malaysia; Aceh; North Aceh Regency; Bener Meriah Regency; North Sumatra; Medan; Binjai; Deli Serdang Regency; Java Island; Banyumas Regency; Garut Regency; Malaysia; Terengganu; Pahang; Perak; Kelantan
- Deaths: 8
- Property damage: 2,773

From 3 to 8 November 2020, several floods and flash floods impacted various areas within Indonesia and Malaysia, causing mass property damage, injuring and killing many, and prompting the evacuation of those in affected houses. They were caused by a convergence zone formed by Cyclone Burevi in Sri Lanka and a low-pressure area in the Philippines. Wider coverage was done on the floods in the province of North Sumatra, which killed eight, injured 5,000, and damaged over 2,000 properties. The ones in neighboring province Aceh affected over 8,000 people, and those in Malaysia affected over 2,000 people across four states. Meanwhile, floods also impacted the Indonesian island of Java, though with less severity.

== Incident ==
In December 2020, two meteorological occurrences were seen in Asia: Cyclone Burevi around Sri Lanka (formed from a tropical depression in Aceh earlier on November 30), and a low-pressure area around the Philippines on November 26 265 kilometers east of Infanta, Quezon. These created a wind convergence zone in the east coast of Sumatra Island, and in North Sumatra's Barisan Mountains.

On circa 20:00 WIB, 3 December 2020, rain begin hitting parts of the city of Medan, North Sumatra, Indonesia. No severe occurrences were recorded, until a levee in Belawan River and several other rivers like the Deli River and Denai River broke, and waters started rushing, causing much of the flood. An hour later, floods started hitting several places, going as deep as 15-60 centimeters, categorizable as a flash flood. Transport mobility quickly exacerbated, and traffic jams were observed. In some places, the flood entered houses. The Indonesian Meteorology, Climatology, and Geophysical Agency (BMKG) predicted mild rain in several areas in Medan. It also issued a warning on the probability of floods and landslides, worsened by strong winds, in the east and western area of the city. By this point, evacuation had commenced.

By 04:00 the following day, the Deli River rushed so strong that houses were damaged in an instant, also overflowing the Binjai and Mencirim Rivers in the neighboring city Binjai. By 08:00, the flood got deeper, most significantly in the Lalang Village. It is the first major flood in the area since 2013. As floods hit the roads, traffic becomes more congested, most concerningly disadvantaging food delivery drivers. Some vehicles also drowned. In some areas, floods measured at up to two meters reached the roofs of houses. Later, the Medan-Binjai Toll Road was flooded. The intensity of the rain reduced at around 16:30, and by 22:30 the remaining inundations range from 30 to 60 centimeters.

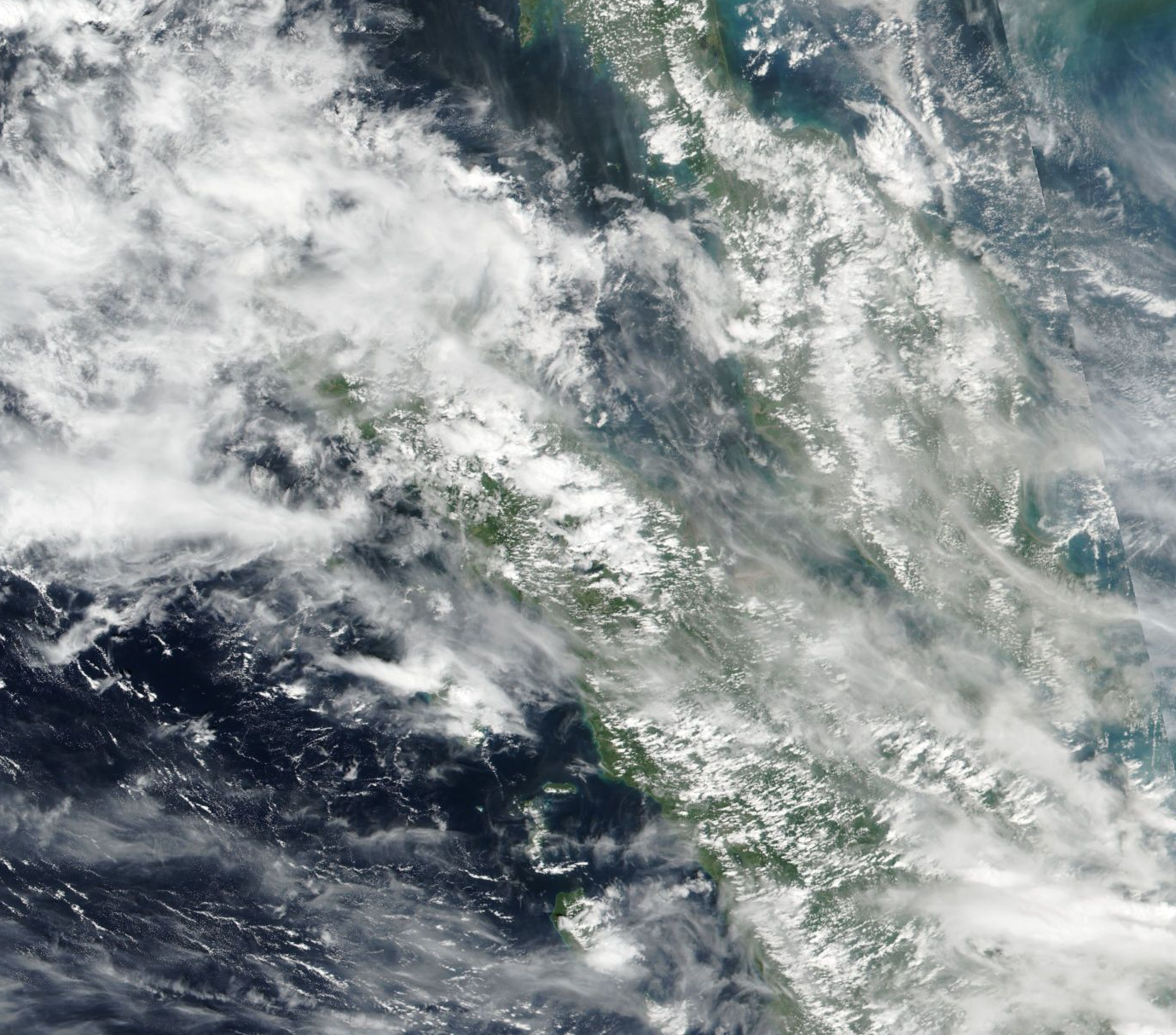
Satellite imagery on 6 December, with Aceh mostly affected

The website FloodList reported that areas around Southeast Asia also saw heavy rain. In Prabumulih, South Sumatra floods on 3 December impacted 180 houses. Another set of floods impacted 23 districts in the North Aceh and Bener Meriah Regencies on 4 December, causing landslides in two districts with one death and 13,675 households affected. Rain was also scattered across Java, causing floods in the Banyumas Regency and landslides in the Garut Regency on 3 December, causing three injuries, 20 property damages, 500 residents evacuated, and "205 families affected". In Malaysia, flooding occurred from 3 to 6 December, and by 5 December affected 1,566 people in the state of Terengganu, 145 in Pahang, 27 in Perak and 369 in Kelantan; the following day, 194 people which made up 52 families were affected.

== Impacts and aftermath ==
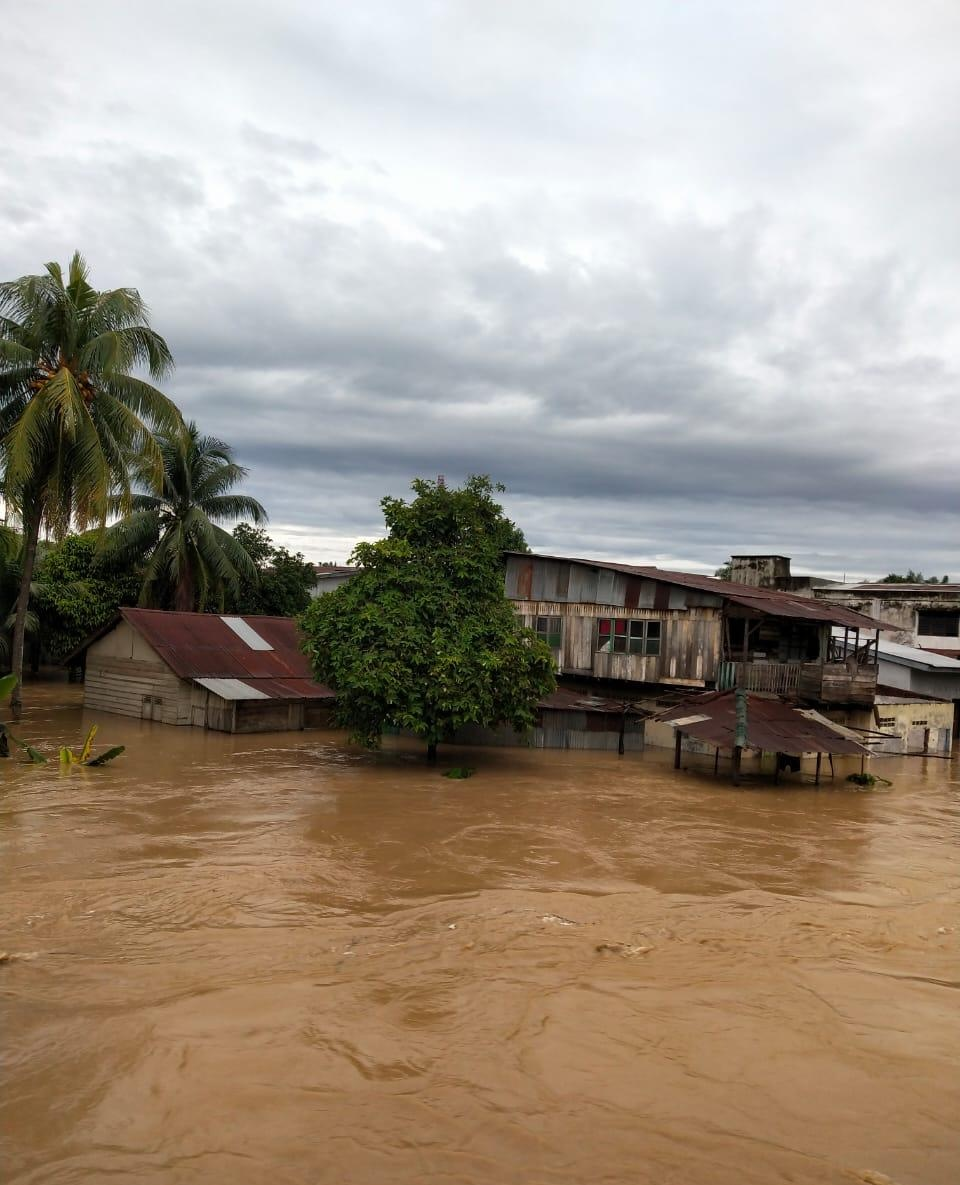
Multiple impacted impoverished houses

By afternoon on 4 December, as much as 2,733 homes (comprising 2.9 million people) have been reportedly impacted by the flood, and seven districts victimized, as well as 5,965 people injured. 1,983 families were among those affected. A Kompas update also reported 6 people missing and 2 dead at the same time. Impoverished people were rescued out of their destroyed houses by the search and rescue team. 50 policemen were sent to search for victims; their focus lied at the De Flamboyan housing estate. The first victim reported dead was a 30-year-old female wearing "long, red sleeves", found in the river near Bokek Beach at 06:20. Not long later, a 20-year-old male wearing "yellow jacket and jeans" named Heka was found at the Griya Nusa III Tanjung Selamat residence, Medan Tuntungan; a female was nearby his body when discovered, whilst crying of grievance. In addition to property damage, a suspension bridge in Aloha Village nearly broke due to the water rushing.

By 16:30, during which the rain had subsided, five of the six missing people have been found dead; they comprise one child, three females, and one male died. With floodwaters reaching up to five meters, 181 people were rescued. An hour later, the sixth person was found dead. Two of the dead was found washed by the Deli River. However it was theorized that the death toll likely more than six. This was proven correct when The Jakarta Post reported the deaths increasing to eight. Impacted administrative districts were Medan Johor, Maimun, Sunggal, Tuntungan, and Polonia. 12,783 people and 4,249 families were reportedly affected. In Binjai, at five sub-districts comprising 16 urban villages, thousands of homes were reportedly destroyed. As of 6 December, accounting the entirety of North Sumatra, more than 31,100 people were affected, as well as 48,000 in Aceh. By 8 December, the count in Aceh rose to 86,724, with 18 damaged houses and four damaged infrastructure.

Medan mayor candidate Bobby Nasution observes several impacted sites and offers lunch for the victims. Meanwhile, incumbent Edy Rahmayadi announced humanitarian aids to the victims presented by Lions Club, Grab, Gojek, dan Relawan Sumut Bermartabat. The Gelora Party made a chain of soup kitchens called "Dapur Berkah Gelora," which translates to "Gelora Glorious Kitchen," which operated for 24 hours in feeding the poor victims. The response from the party was well received by the locals. To prevent future accidents from happening, locals built an emergency dam made from sand wrapped with sacks of plant fibers, placed in areas of rivers untouched by the flood. Online, #prayformedan became trending for a short while. The Ministry of Social Affairs provided financial aid to inheritance of Rp. 15 million to the families of the dead, several evacuee tents with insulation and ventilation to protect refugees from the COVID-19 virus, as well as additional soup kitchens guarded by 31 disaster management cadets.
