= 2000 Sri Lanka cyclone =

Tropical cyclone

Extremely Severe Cyclonic Storm BOB 06
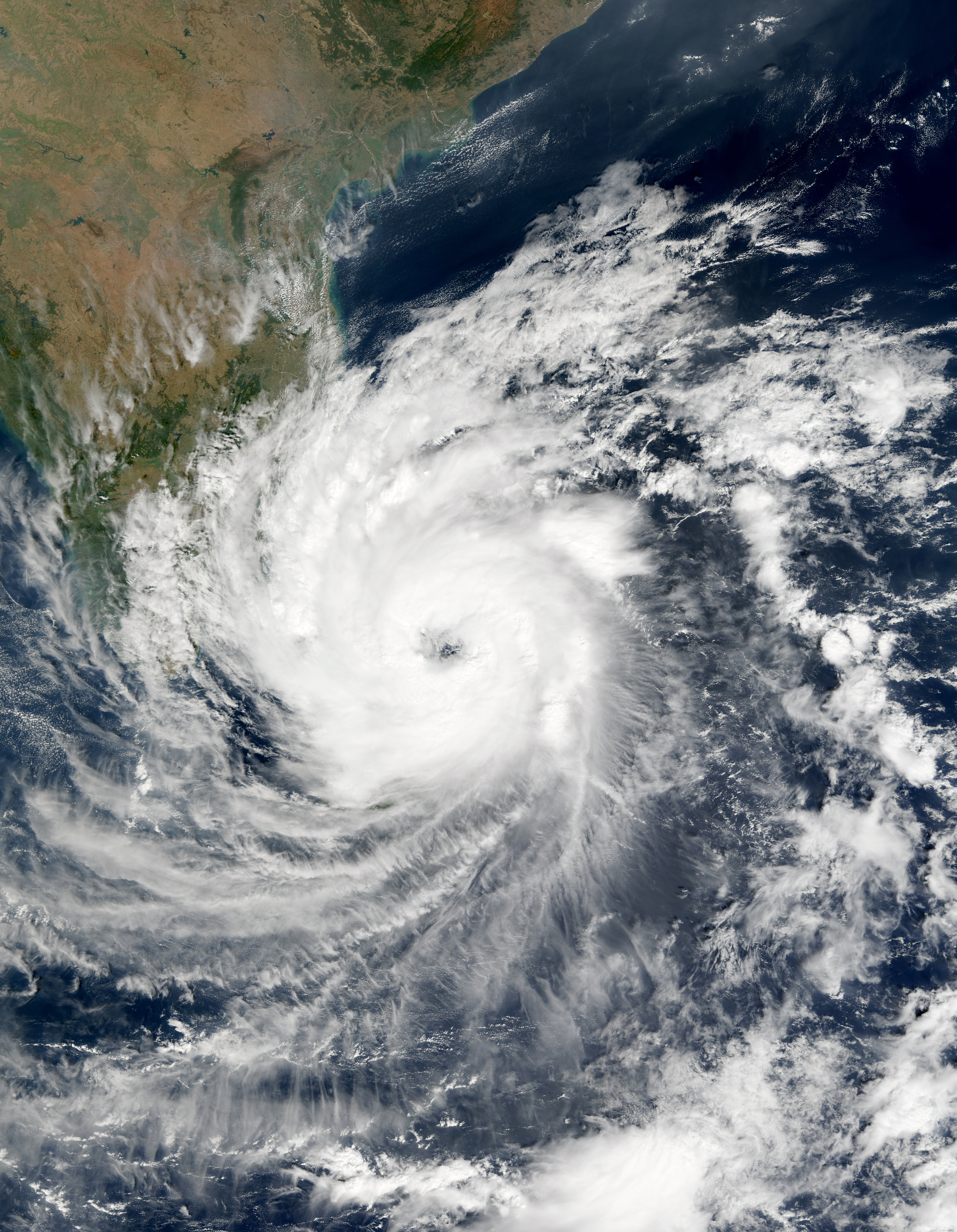
- Cyclone 04B at peak intensity near landfall

Meteorological history
- Formed: December 23, 2000
- Remnant low: December 28
- Dissipated: December 29, 2000

Extremely severe cyclonic storm
- 3-minute sustained (IMD)
- Highest winds: 165 km/h (105 mph)
- Lowest pressure: 970 hPa (mbar); 28.64 inHg

Category 1-equivalent tropical cyclone
- 1-minute sustained (SSHWS/JTWC)
- Highest winds: 120 km/h (75 mph)

Overall effects
- Fatalities: 9 direct
- Missing: 8
- Areas affected: Sri Lanka, India
- IBTrACS
- Part of the 2000 North Indian Ocean cyclone season

The 2000 Sri Lanka cyclone (IMD designation: BOB 06 JTWC designation: 04B) was the strongest tropical cyclone to strike Sri Lanka since 1978. The fourth tropical storm and the second severe cyclonic storm of the 2000 North Indian Ocean cyclone season, it developed from an area of disturbed weather on December 25, 2000. It moved westward, and quickly strengthened under favorable conditions to reach top wind speeds of 75 mph (121 km/h). The cyclone hit eastern Sri Lanka at peak strength, then weakened slightly while crossing the island before making landfall over southern India on December 28. The storm degenerated into a remnant low later that day, before merging with another trough on the next day.

The storm was the first cyclone over Sri Lanka with winds of at least hurricane strength since a cyclone of 1978 hit the island in the 1978 season, as well as the first tropical storm to hit the island since 1992. The storm was also the first December tropical cyclone of hurricane intensity in the Bay of Bengal since 1996. It produced heavy rainfall and strong winds, damaging or destroying tens of thousands of houses and leaving up to 500,000 homeless. At least nine people died as a result of the cyclone.

== Meteorological history ==
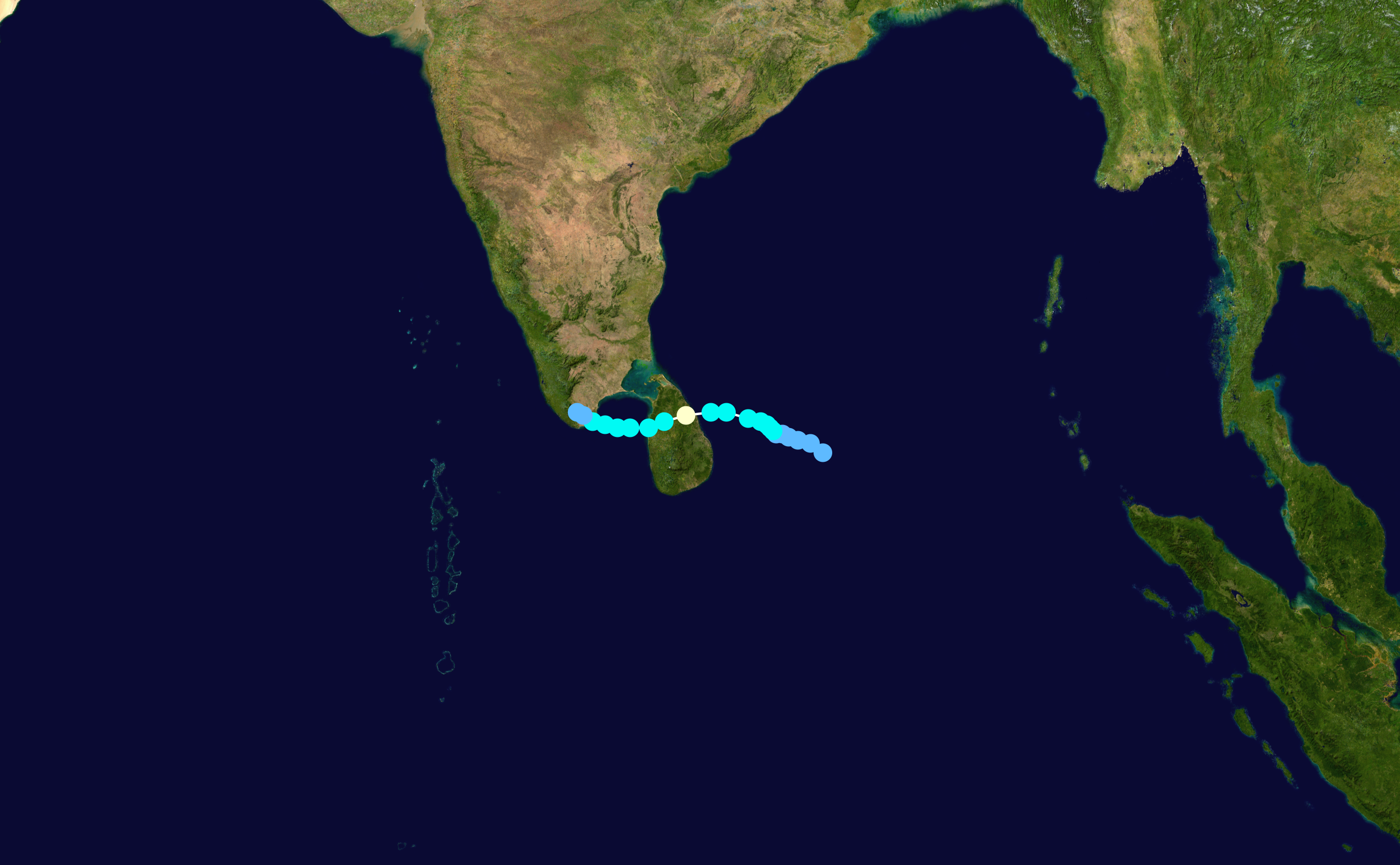
Map plotting the storm's track and intensity, according to the Saffir–Simpson scale Map key Saffir–Simpson scale Tropical depression (≤38 mph, ≤62 km/h) Tropical storm (39–73 mph, 63–118 km/h) Category 1 (74–95 mph, 119–153 km/h) Category 2 (96–110 mph, 154–177 km/h) Category 3 (111–129 mph, 178–208 km/h) Category 4 (130–156 mph, 209–251 km/h) Category 5 (≥157 mph, ≥252 km/h) Unknown Storm type Tropical cyclone Subtropical cyclone Extratropical cyclone, remnant low, tropical disturbance, or monsoon depression

An area of atmospheric convection developed and persisted on December 21 in the central Bay of Bengal forming within an active near-equatorial trough. Located within an area of weak vertical wind shear, the system steadily organized, and after initially remaining nearly stationary it began to move slowly westward. Deep convection continued to develop, and on December 23 a mid-level circulation began to form. Later that day, the Joint Typhoon Warning Center (JTWC) issued a Tropical Cyclone Formation Alert. By the night of the December 23, a low-level circulation developed in the system, located to the south of the deep convection. The disturbance continued to organize, with the India Meteorological Department (IMD) classifying it as a deep depression early on December 24. Later that day, the organization of the system degraded slightly, though it quickly reorganized. On December 25, the Joint Typhoon Warning Center initiated advisories on Tropical Cyclone 04B while it was located about 155 miles (249 km) east of Sri Lanka. On the center's first advisory, the tropical storm was drifting west-northwest at 3 mph (4.8 km/h) with maximum sustained winds of 45 mph (72 km/h). Shortly thereafter, the IMD upgraded the deep depression to a cyclonic storm as a central dense overcast developed over the center.

A subtropical ridge to the north of the cyclone resulted in it continuing generally westward. Deep convection continued to develop over the center of circulation, and the storm steadily strengthened as outflow improved throughout the circulation. By late on December 25, a rainband wrapped tightly into the center, and it intensified into a severe cyclonic storm as it approached the coast of Sri Lanka. The next day the cyclone developed an eye as it turned west-southwestward. On December 26, the cyclone made landfall on near Trincomalee, Sri Lanka. The JTWC assessed the cyclone as attaining peak winds of 75 mph (121 km/h). However, the IMD estimated the cyclone reached a maximum intensity of 105 mph (169 km/h), making it a very severe cyclonic storm. It weakened slightly over land and emerged into the Gulf of Mannar early on December 27 as a tropical storm. Initially, forecasters predicted it to slowly re-intensify; instead it weakened as its convection degraded in organization and intensity. After turning west-northwestward, the storm struck southern India near Kanyakumari on December 28 with winds of 45 mph (72 km/h), with minimal convection due to land interaction and increased wind shear. It rapidly weakened to tropical depression status over land, degenerating into a remnant low later that day. Early on December 29, the cyclone's remnants emerged into the eastern Arabian Sea and merged with another trough.

== Impact ==
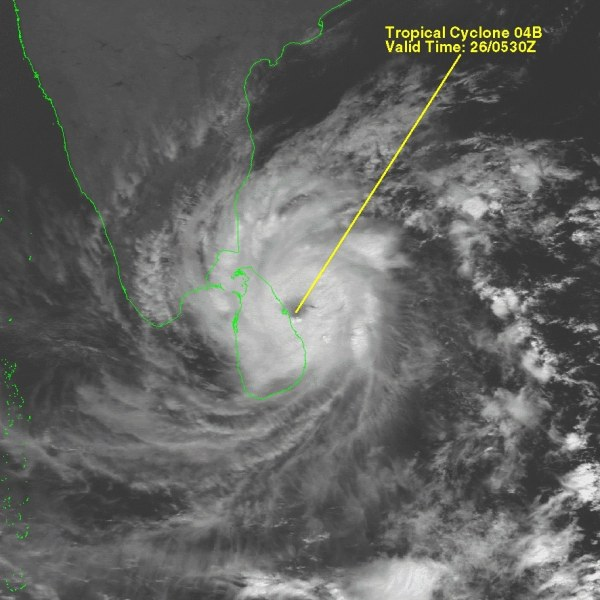
Cyclone 04B near Sri Lanka landfall

Government officials in Sri Lanka issued a last-minute evacuation order for potentially affected areas, though few received the evacuation order. The cyclone hit the eastern and western coastlines with powerful waves, wrecking 25 fishing boats in eastern coastal towns and washing away 109 boats near Puttalam. Eight people were left missing and feared dead. The cyclone was accompanied with a storm surge as made landfall that flooded areas up to 330 feet (100 m) inland. While crossing the country, the cyclone dropped between 4 and 8 inches (100 and 200 millimetres) of precipitation, compounding the effects of severe monsoonal flooding from the previous month. Wind gusts from the cyclone reached 110 mph (180 km/h) near where it made landfall.

The area most affected by the cyclone was in and around Trincomalee: 57 people checked into the local hospital as a result of falling trees or debris, with one person killed due to a falling tree. An entire fishing village was completely destroyed, and heavy rainfall flooded rivers, lakes, and canals, covering roads and crops with floodwaters. The flooding destroyed about 77 square miles (200 km^{2}) of rice fields, and an additional 19 square miles (49 km^{2}) of other crops. Strong winds damaged or destroyed around 83,000 houses across the country, including 2,000 houses destroyed in Kinnia and 6,600 in Trincomalee. The passage of the cyclone left up to 500,000 temporarily homeless on the island, most of whom fled to churches, schools, temples, and shopping centers. The winds blew off the roofs of several police stations and military camps, and flooded several refugee camps. The winds damaged electrical systems and disrupted about 3,000 telephone systems, and many roads were left impassable. Large areas remained without power for several days. No damage reports exist for regions under control of the Liberation Tigers of Tamil Eelam, despite the fact the storm made landfall there. Throughout the country, at least nine people died as a result of the cyclone, and over 48,000 families were affected.

Prior to the arrival of the storm in India, government officials there issued a severe storm warning for Thoothukudi District, and also warned fishermen not to go out to sea. Thousands were evacuated to emergency shelters prior to the storm's arrival. The cyclone produced rough surf along the southern Indian coast, and heavy rainfall in and around Thoothukudi, causing flooding in a few low-lying areas. The rainfall caused some damage to banana crops, uprooted several trees, and left some roads impassable, but was largely beneficial in alleviating drought conditions. Across southern India, the cyclone damaged 749 houses and destroyed 81 more, but no deaths were reported in the country.

== Aftermath ==
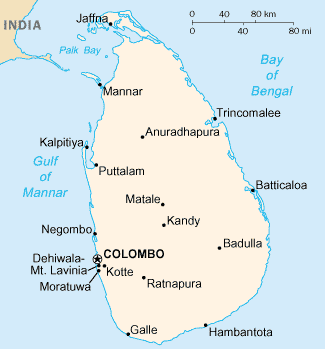
Map of Sri Lanka

Sri Lanka governmental aid was slow at first, with the media criticizing the government for its initial response. A street protest occurred in Trincomalee due to lack of aid. Prime Minister Ratnasiri Wickremanayake organized a meeting of government officials to propose an increase in relief funds. A family of five or more received $5.50 a week (2000 USD, ($10.28 2026 USD), 500 in 2000 LKR) for dry rations, while the families of those who died received $183 (2000 USD, 342.13 2026 USD, 15,000 2000 LKR) in compensation. The government also gave $122 (2000 USD, ($228.09 2026 USD, 10,000 2000 LKR)) to those whose houses were damaged or destroyed, and delivered rice rations to those stranded, while state-organized radio broadcasts appealed for donations.

Within two days of the cyclone striking, the Sri Lankan Red Cross began an operation with 4,000 volunteers to help those most badly affected. The International Federation of Red Cross and Red Crescent Societies issued a preliminary appeal for $323,000 2000 USD ($706,696 2026 USD, 525,000 in 2000 CHF) to assist about 10,000 people by making blankets, shelter, food, and kitchen utensils available. To kick-start the operation, the Federation released about $61,000 (2000 USD ($114,043 2026 USD, 100,000 in 2000 CHF)) within a few hours of the cyclone making landfall. After about a month, the Red Cross distributed 10 roofing sheets each to 1,720 families, and also sent a set of cooking utensils, bed sheets, and sleeping mats to 3,000 families. Relief ended on November 7, 2001, roughly 40 weeks after the cyclone struck.

== See also ==
- List of notable tropical cyclones
- Cyclone Burevi
