= Bordeaux copy of the Essays (Montaigne) =

1588 edition of Michel de Montaigne's Essais

Essais (Bordeaux copy)
- Bordeaux municipal library
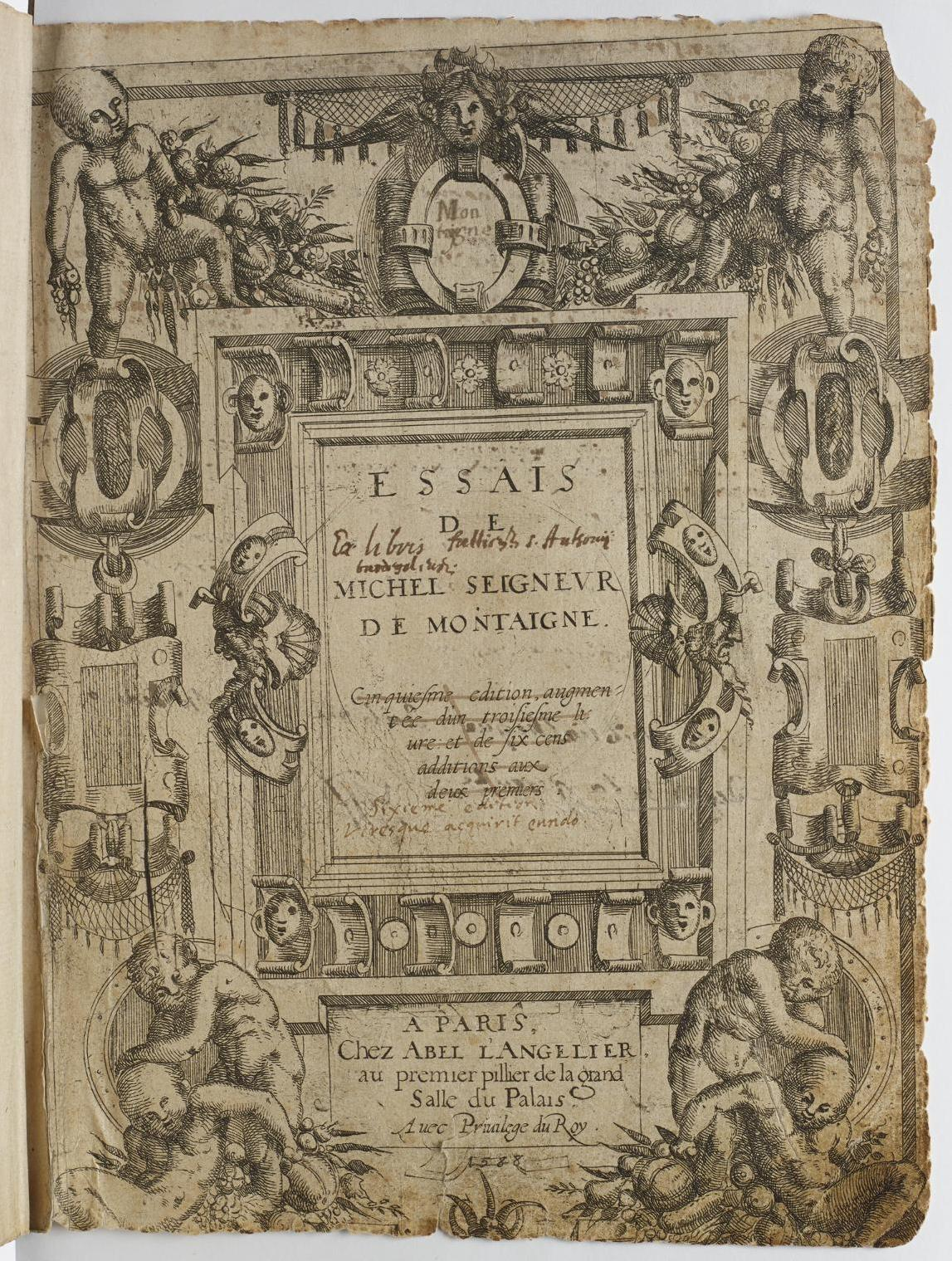
- Frontispiece of the Bordeaux copy
- Date: 1588-1592
- Language: Middle French
- Author: Michel de Montaigne
- Material: Paper
- Size: 26,5 x 20 x 7 cm
- Additions: Book printed in Paris and annotated by Montaigne at Saint-Michel-de-Montaigne

The Bordeaux copy of the Essays is a 1588 edition of Michel de Montaigne's Essays held by the Bibliothèque municipale de Bordeaux.

The book contains about 1300 manuscript corrections and annotations made by Montaigne between the summer of 1588 and the 13 September 1592 (date of his death). This unique document sheds light on the way Montaigne worked and on the genesis of the final edition of the Essais.

Manuscripts by 16th century authors are very rare and this document is exceptional.

== The 1588 edition of the Essais ==
Montaigne published the first two volumes of his Essais in 1580, printed by Simon Millanges in Bordeaux. The books' success (1582 – a re-edition published in Bordeaux; a possible re-edition published in Rouen before 1584 and in 1587 a re-edition published in Paris) attracted the interest of the Paris publisher Abel L'Angelier, who, in 1588, published a new modified and expanded version of the Essais.

For this edition L'Angelier obtained the exclusive printing, publishing and selling rights for nine years. Volumes I and II of the 1580 edition were completed with a volume III. In contrast with the small sizes (in octavo and in duodecimo) of the earlier editions), the 1588 edition is in quarto, more than 1000 pages with large margins and a magnificent copper-plate engraved frontispiece in the School of Fontainebleau style. Unfortunately the number of copies that L'Angelier printed is not known with certainty. Today there are 46 copies held by public libraries and 120 in private collections. It is possible that a quasi-revolutionary event like the Day of the Barricades in May 1588 blocked the diffusion of this edition.

Michel de Montaigne received a small number copies from Abel L'Angelier and he offered a few of them to his friends. For example, he gave one to: Antoine Loisel with a manuscript dedication; the wife of doctor Julien Le Paulmier, who treated him in the Spring 1588. He kept at least two copies for his own personal use : the so-called Lambiotte copy, now held by the Bordeaux municipal library, which contains a certain number of manuscript corrections and another copy, the so-called Bordeaux copy, which contains over 1300 manuscript corrections, modification and additions as well as 6000 punctuation corrections.

== The Lambiotte copy ==
This copy of the 1588 edition of the Essais, previously owned by Ernest Labadie at the end of the 19th century and by Auguste Lambiotte and Pierre Bérès during the 20th century, was purchased by the Bordeaux municipal library in 1991 and is known as the Lambiotte copy.

The book contains a certain number of handwritten corrections of the text (feuillets 59v, 122v, 143v, 234v, 264r, 283r et 495v), typographical corrections and underlining. These are the earliest examples of Montaigne's re-reading of the 1588 text. Another important correction is in the preface Au lecteur : Montaigne crossed out the published date (12 June 1588) and replaces it with 1 March 1580, which is the day after his birthday anniversary. This same correction occurs in two other copies : the Solvay copy, held in Brussels and the Bordeaux copy.

== The Bordeaux copy ==
Originally, Montaigne probably intended to communicate the document to the copy editor, as witnessed by the suggestions written on the verso of the title page and the typographical and spelling corrections written in the margins of the body of the book (for example : "ceste" corrected to "cette" in fol.6 and "&" to "et" in fol. 9, etc.). These modifications, analogous to proof corrections do not go further than fol. 16. However, as the notes accumulated, the book is transformed into a working copy of a new edition, always being modified and in constant evolution. Montaigne compared his work to a growing child and he borrowed from Virgil the Latin half-verse viresque acquirit eundo (= he gathers strength as he goes) which he wrote as a motto on the title page.

There are about 1300 manuscript notes spread over the page margins, in foot-notes and in page headers. Some of the notes are very short : a few words, parenthetical insertions or slight modification of some earlier idea. Montaigne improves his writing style : lightens his sentences, removes repetitions and inesthetic phrasing. The Bordeaux copy has about 6000 punctuation changes!

On the other hand, some of his notes almost fill all of the empty space of a page. Montaigne uses the margins to multiply the number of Latin quotes. in a new format : before 1588 the quote were almost only in verses, now they are included directly in the French texts. He also adds entirely new text in the margins of each of the chapters by successive additions, scrupulously re-read and corrected. The Bordeaux copy shows that Montaigne was anything but the nonchalant dilettante that he pretended to be in public.

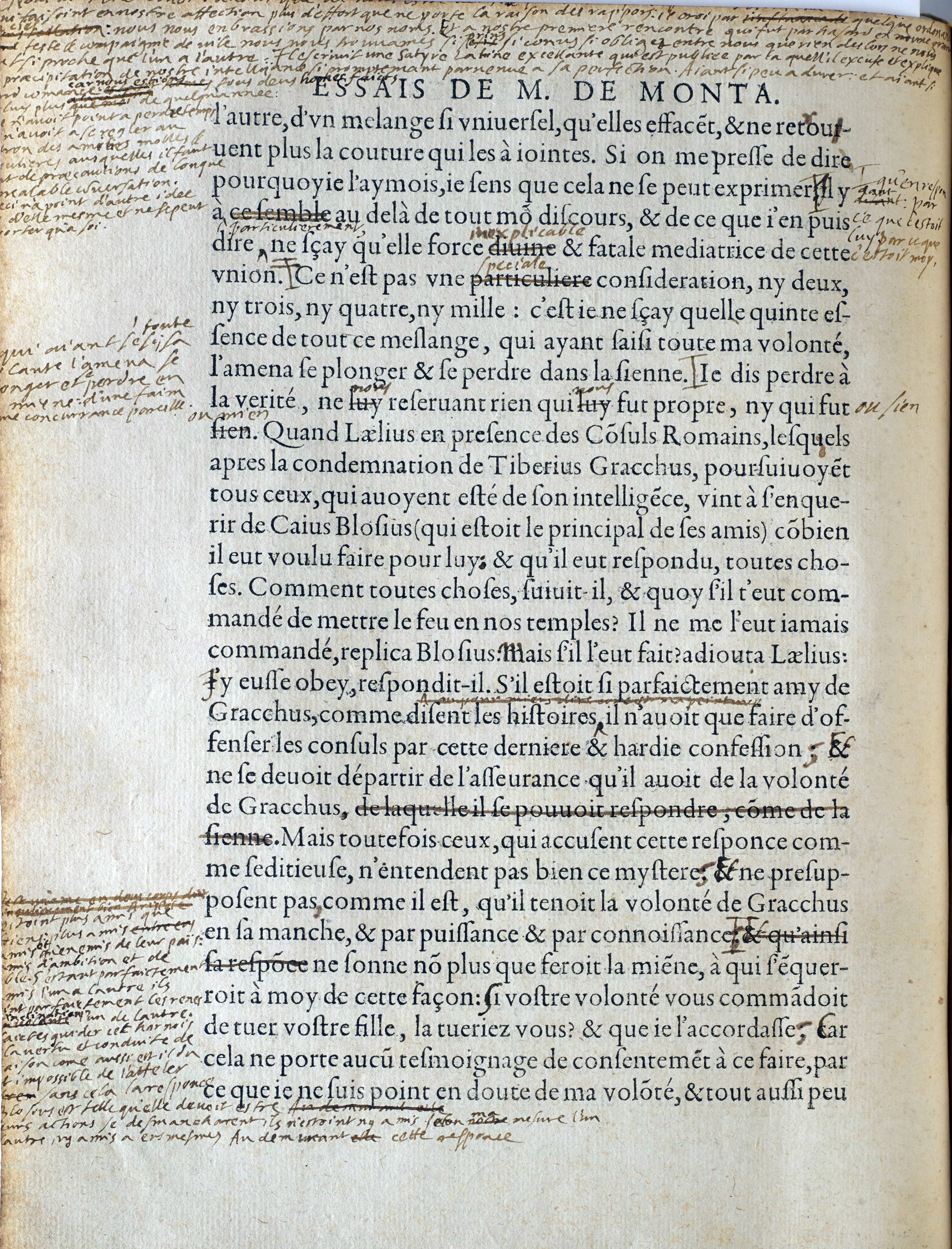
The Bordeaux copy, feuillet 71v, where Montaigne wrote his famous aphorism : "Parce que c'était lui, parce que c'était moi"

As the notes evolve Montaigne's thoughts and ideas are more precise, clearer and more courageous. His biographer, Donald M. Frame, indicates five domains where the re-working of the text is particularly important:

- The introspection on his frailties and his old-age : « moi qui ose tant dire de moi : ne parlois de mon argent qu'en mensonge », fol. 22; « mon monde est failli, ma forme est vuidee », fol. 447).
- The ribald imagery used for didactic purposes : « au plus eslevé throne du monde, si ne somes assis que sur nostre cul », fol. 496; « c'est ce qu'on appelle chier dans le panier, pour après le mettre sur sa teste », fol. 373.
- He is very lucid about his book and his project : « Je n'ay pas plus faict mon livre que mon livre m'a faict », fol. 285v; « je me suis presenté moy-mesmes à moy, pour argument & pour subject; C'est le seul livre au monde de son espece », fol. 158).
- The criticism of the hypocrisy and religious opportunism of some of his contemporaries : « Voïes l'horrible impudance de quoi nous pelotons les raisons divines et combien irreligieusement nous les avons & rejettees & reprinses selon que la fortune nous a changé de place en ces orages publiques », fol. 178v);
- The characterisation of his moral code, independent and directed towards the search with integrity of virtuous and natural pleasure : (« la vertu... aime la vie, la beauté et la gloire et la santé », fol. 60).

The most famous addition is about his friend Étienne de La Boétie. Montaigne completes the printed sentence : « si on me presse de dire pourquoy je l'aymois, je sens que cela ne se peut exprimer qu'en respondant : parce que c'estoit luy, parce que c'estoit moy » (fol. 71v).

All the notes are in Montaigne's handwriting, except for three of them : (fol. 42v, 47 et 290v-291), which were added by Marie de Gournay, who edited the posthumous edition of Les Essais.

Michel de Montaigne died in 1592 before he could publish a new version of his Essais. It was Marie de Gournay who did the editing for a new edition that was published in 1595 by Abel L'Angelier. In her preface she mentions the Bordeaux copy which was in Montaigne's tower : (« je pourrois appeler à tesmoing une autre copie qui reste en sa maison »). The text she published has many differences with the Bordeaux copy, which leads one to suppose that she used another annoted copy or notes left by Montaigne which are now lost. After 1595 all the later editions of the 17th and 18th centuries reproduced the Marie de Gournay text (and often with many variations).

== The tribulations of the Bordeaux copy ==
About 22 years after Montaigne's death the Bordeaux copy was transferred to the Feuillants monastery in Bordeaux. What were the reasons for this transfer ?

Towards the end of his life, Montaigne admired the austere faith of this religious order. He noted in the margin of chapter I, 37 of the Bordeaux copy : « Je ne laisse d'advouer sincerement la continance des Feuillens et Capuchins et de bien treuver l'air de leur train. Je m'insinue par imagination fort bien en leur place » (fol. 96). A few months after Montaigne's death his widow Françoise de La Chassaigne had his body transferred to the Bordeaux convent (in the Livre de raison for the 13 September 1592, is written : Françoise de La Chassaigne sa veuve « fit porter son corps à Bourdeaus et le fit enterrer en l'église des Feuillans où elle luy fit faire un tombeau eslevé ». Subsequently, around 1614, and following the wishes of his widow, a part of Montaigne's library was also transferred to the convent, and amongst these books was the Bordeaux copy.

Once at the monastery an ex-libris is added to the title-page and, more importantly, the book is bound. Unfortunately, during the binding process the book is trimmed and several of Montaigne's annotations in the margins were lost.

From the beginning of the 17th century to 1772 there is no mention of the Bordeaux copy. In 1772 Louis-Mayeul Chaudon refers to it in his Nouveau dictionnaire historique. But François de Neufchâteau, agronomist, poet and statesman, is usually considered as the re-discoverer of the Bordeaux copy. He learned of its existence during a stay in Guyenne and started a correspondence in 1777 with abbé Desbiey, librarian of the convent and member of the Académie des sciences, belles-lettres et arts de Bordeaux.

Neufchâteau realised the importance of the Bordeaux copy, which had many differences with the Marie de Gournay edition, and he intended to publish a version of Les Essais which corresponded to the annotations by Montaigne. However, his political career prevented his full-time activity on the project and in 1800 he arranged for the Bordeaux copy to be sent to Paris and there the task of editing the new edition was taken over by Jacques-André Naigeon. The edition based on the Bordeaux copy was published in 1802.

The Bordeaux copy could have stayed in Paris, but Jean-Baptiste Monbalon, the Bordeaux town librarian from 1786 to 1830, managed to negotiate its return to Bordeaux in 1807. Since that date it has been one of the most prestigious treasures of the Bibliothèque municipale de Bordeaux.

== Editions of the Essais based on the Bordeaux copy ==
After the publication of the Naigeon edition of Les Essais in 1802 several later editions during the 19th century were published based on the 1595 edition of Marie de Gournay and even on the 1588 edition, le last one published during Montaigne's lifetime. However, during the 20th century the Bordeaux copy was used in the following re-editions of Les Essais :

- The so-called "municipale édition", coordinated by Fortunat Strowski and François Gébelin, published between 1906 and 1933.
- The Pierre Villey edition, published by Alcan en 1922. In 1965 this text was republished by Presses universitaires de France and re-edited in 1968 and 1978. This edition claims to conforme to the text of the Bordeaux copy, but for certain passages which are difficult to interpret favours the 1595 edition.
- The edition of the Œuvres complètes de Montaigne (from 1924 to 1941), directed by Arthur Armaingaud uses the Bordeaux copy as the reference text for Les Essais.
- The first edition of Montaigne's Oeuvres in the bibliothèque de la Pléiade, 1933, directed by Albert Thibaudet (re-edited in 1939, 1940, 1946 and 1950), was based on the Bordeaux copy.
- The edition directed by André Tournon for the Imprimerie nationale in 1997-1998 (re-edited in 2003) incorporates once more the hand-written modifications made by Montaigne on his working copy of the 1588 edition.

The claim that the 1595 edition represents the final version of the Essais has been reaffirmed, mainly because the differences between it and the Bordeaux copy indicate that there was very probably another manuscript written by Montaigne in which he copied all his requests for changes to the 1588 edition for the printer.

In 2007 for the re-edition of Les Essais in bibliothèque de la Pleiade, the editors preferred to use the text from the 1595 edition.

The Bordeaux copy is the only existing manuscript illustrating the genesis of Les Essais and as such has an enormous historical value, not only for the number of modifications to the printed text, but also for their role in restructuring the Montaigne's thoughts by the auto-correction, amplifications and critiques : « En répartissant tout au long du livre ce qu'il veut y ajouter, au lieu de composer de nouveaux chapitres, Montaigne, désormais, confronte sa pensée avec elle-même. Les nouveaux propos interrogent les anciens, les sollicitent, les infléchissent ou les confirment, presque toujours en accentuant leurs audaces ».

== See also ==
- Château de Montaigne

== Bibliography ==
- Balsamo, J.; Simonin, M (2002). Abel L'Angelier et Françoise de Louvain (1574-1620) (in French). Geneva: Librairie Droz. pp. 239–243. ISBN 2-600-00632-X.
- Balsamo, J. (2013). "EB vs 95: un débat bien français pour une question mal posée". Bulletin de la Société Internationale des Amis de Montaigne (in French) (2): 269–286. ISSN 2119-9434.
- Balsamo, J. (2014). "Mises au net, copie d'auteur, copie d'imprimeur : note sur les formes de l'autographie dans la genèse éditoriale" (PDF). Seizième siècle (in French). 10 (10): 15–30. doi:10.3406/xvi.2014.1090. ISSN 1775-3856.
- Bernoulli, R. (1987). Michel de Montaigne, Essais, reproduction en fac-similé de l'exemplaire de Bordeaux 1588 annoté par Michel de Montaigne (in French). Geneva: Slatkine. ISBN 2-05-100835-3.
- Blum, C.; Tournon, A. (1997). Éditer les Essais de Montaigne : actes du colloque tenu à l'Université Paris IV-Sorbonne les 27 et 28 janvier 1995 (in French). Paris: H. Champion. ISBN 2-85203-692-4.
- Bonnefon, P. (1896). "Une supercherie de Mlle de Gournay". Revue d'histoire littéraire de la France (in French). 3: 70–89.
- Bonnet, P. (1964). "L'Exemplaire de Bordeaux et le texte définitif des Essais". Mémorial du 1^{er} congrès international des études montaignistes (in French). Bordeaux. pp. 94–100.
- Botineau, P. (1992). "L'Exemplaire de Bordeaux". Montaigne 1533-1592 (in French). Bordeaux: L'Escampette (published 1922). pp. 43–76. ISBN 2-909428-01-X.
- Courteault, P. (1940). "L'Exemplaire de Bordeaux au XVIII^{e} siècle". Bulletin de la Société des Amis de Montaigne (in French). 9: 54–56. ISSN 1160-7319..
- Demonet, M;-L.; Legros, A. (2013). "Montaigne à sa plume. Quatre variantes d'une correction de date dans l'avis au lecteur des Essais de 1588". Bibliothèque d'Humanisme et Renaissance (in French). 75: 113–120. ISSN 0006-1999..
- Desan, Ph.; Coulombel, A. (1995). Montaigne in the print : The presentation of a Renaissance text. Chicago: The University of Chicago.
- Desan, Ph. (2001). Montaigne dans tous ses états (in French). Fasano: Schena. ISBN 88-8229-261-4.
- Desan, Ph. (2007). "Exemplaire de Bordeaux". Dictionnaire de Michel de Montaigne (in French). Paris: Champion. ISBN 978-2-7453-1630-1.
- Desan, Ph. (2002) [2002]. Reproduction en quadrichromie de l'Exemplaire de Bordeaux, précédée d'une Histoire d'EB (in French). Chicago /Fasano: Schena / Montaigne studies (published 2011). ISBN 88-8229-284-3.
- Desan, Ph. (2012). "Les Essais sur vingt ans : remarques sur le travail de Montaigne". La librairie de Montaigne, Cambridge French Colloquia (in French). Bordeaux: L'Escampette. pp. 201–213. ISBN 9780955490514.
- Desgraves, Louis (1980). "L'Exemplaire de Bordeaux des Essais de Montaigne". Revue française d'histoire du livre (in French). 28: 373–392. ISSN 0037-9212..
- Frame, D. (2018). "Les additions finales (1588-1592)". Montaigne une vie, une œuvre 1533-1592 (in French). Paris: Classiques Garnier. pp. 311–324. ISBN 978-2-406-08308-5.
- Iemma, P. (2004). Les Repentirs de l'Exemplaire de Bordeaux (Montaigne Essais, Livre I) (in French). Paris: H. Champion. ISBN 2-7453-1147-6.
- Legros, Alain (2003). "Montaigne et Gournay en marge des Essais : trois petites notes pour quatre mains". Bibliothèque d'Humanisme et Renaissance (in French). 65: 613–630. ISSN 0006-1999.
- Legros, Alain (2003). Montaigne, Essais I. 56, " Des Prières " : Édition annotée des sept premiers états du texte avec étude de genèse et commentaires (in French). Genève: Droz. ISBN 2-600-00871-3..
- Legros, Alain (2008). "Nous deux, mais c'était lui ou moi (Montaigne et/ou La Boétie)". Genesis (in French). 29: 159–164. doi:10.3406/item.2008.1448. ISSN 1167-5101..
- Magnien, C. (2014). "Litures et trasseures au chapitre "De la physionomie" : réflexions sur la rature dans l'Exemplaire de Bordeaux". Montaigne Studies (in French). 26: 87–103. ISSN 1049-2917..
- Maskell, D. (1978). "Montaigne correcteur de l'Exemplaire de Bordeaux". Bulletin de la Société des Amis de Montaigne (in French). 25–26: 57–71. ISSN 0037-9182..
- Maskell, D. (1978). "Quel est le dernier état authentique des Essais de Montaigne ?". Bibliothèque d'Humanisme et Renaissance (in French). 40: 85–103. ISSN 0006-1999..
- Okubo, Y. (1988). "" Quelques transcriptions erronées de l'exemplaire de Bordeaux dans les éditions modernes des Essais "". Bulletin de l'Association d'Étude sur l'humanisme, la Réforme et la Renaissance. 26: 23–24. doi:10.3406/rhren.1988.1611..
- Salles, A. (1938). "Le duel entre l'édition de 1595 et le manuscrit de Bordeaux". Bulletin des Amis de Montaigne (in French): 24–26. ISSN 1160-7319.
- Sayce, R. (1974). "L'édition des Essais de 1595". Bibliothèque d'humanisme et Renaissance (in French). 36: 115–141. ISSN 0006-1999..
- Sayce, R.; Maskell, D. (1983). A Descriptive Bibliography of Montaigne's Essais. London: Bibliographical society / in conjunction with Modern humanities research association. pp. 9–17. ISBN 0-19-721794-X.
- Simonin, M. (1995). "Aux origines de l'édition de 1595". Journal of Medieval and Renaissance Studies (in French). 25: 313–343. ISSN 0047-2573..
- Simonin, M. (1997). "Montaigne, son éditeur et le correcteur devant l'Exemplaire de Bordeaux des Essais". Travaux de littérature (in French). 11: 75–93. ISSN 0995-6794..
- Simonin, M. (2000). "L'Exemplaire et l'édition posthume". Bulletin de la Société des Amis de Montaigne (in French). 17–18: 120–129. ISSN 0037-9182..
- Simonin, M. (2004). L'encre et la lumière (in French). Genève: Droz. pp. 509–522 et 551–647. ISBN 2-600-00697-4..
- Tournon, A. (1999). "L'Exemplaire et la copie". Bulletin de la Société des Amis de Montaigne (in French). 13–14: 71–77. ISSN 0037-9182..
- Zeitlin, R. (1934). "The relation of the text of 1595 to that of the Bordeaux Copy". The Essays of Michel de Montaigne. New York. pp. 421–434.
