= Fortunat Strowski =

French literary historian, essayist and critic

Fortunat Joseph Strowski de Robkowa (16 May 1866 – 11 July 1952) was a French literary historian, essayist and critic. A specialist on Pascal and Montaigne, he superintended the first critical edition of Montaigne's Essays.

== Life ==
Fortunat Strowski was born in Carcassonne to a Jewish family from Galicia, then a province of the Austro-Hungarian Empire. He was educated in France, where he was a student of Ferdinand Brunetière.

In 1906 Strowski produced an edition of Montaigne's Essays based upon the Bordeaux copy (a copy of the fifth edition, with additions in Montaigne's own hand, preserved in the Bordeaux City Library), rather than the posthumously published 1595 edition of the Essays.

In 1930 Strowksi was named professor of contemporary French history at the Sorbonne. In 1939 he took up a position at the new Universidade do Brasil in Rio de Janeiro. He died in Cervières in France in 1952.

== Works ==
- Saint François de Sales; introduction à l'histoire du sentiment religieux en France au dix-septième siècle, 1897
- Histoire du sentiment religieux en France au XVIIe siècle: Pascal et son temps, 1907
- Tableau de la littérature française au XIXe siècle, 1912
- Tableau de la littérature française : au XIXe siècle et au XXe siècle, 1924
- La sagesse française: Montaigne, Saint François de Sales, Descartes, La Rochefoucauld, Pascal, 1925
- Les Pensées de Pascal; étude et analyse, 1929
- Montaigne; sa vie publique et privée , 1938
