= Montaigne's tower =

Historical monument in southern France

Coordinates: 44.8778°N 0.0301°E

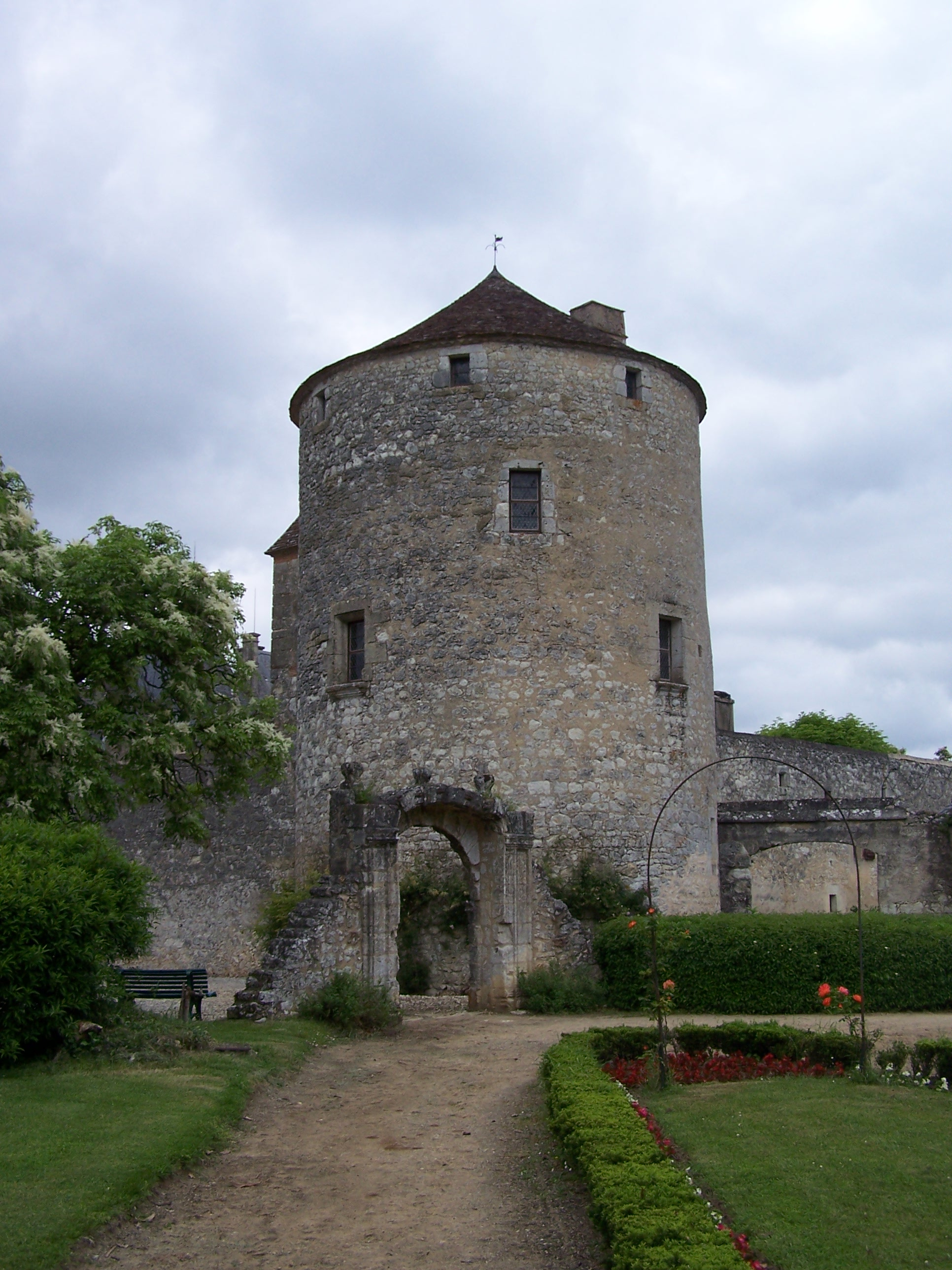
Southern facade of the tower

Montaigne's Tower is the southern tower of the Château de Montaigne, a historical monument located in the French département of Dordogne. The tower is the only vestige of the original sixteenth-century castle, since the other buildings had to be rebuilt following a fire in 1885.

The tower was renovated and redecorated to Michel de Montaigne's specifications in 1571, following his first retirement from public life. It notably contained the famous library and study in which he spent "most of his days" and the study in which the Essays were written.

In recognition of its historical and cultural significance, the tower has been classified as monument historique by the French government since 1952. It is the only one of the castle's buildings to be open to visitors today.

== Architecture ==
The tower is in fact composed of three distinct architectural elements: the central round tower, a smaller secondary tower (containing a spiral staircase), and a square corps de logis protruding from the tower. It was built in the sixteenth century in the neo-renaissance style. It abuts the barbican defending the main entrance to the castle and its courtyard, or cour d'honneur, on the side of the gate.

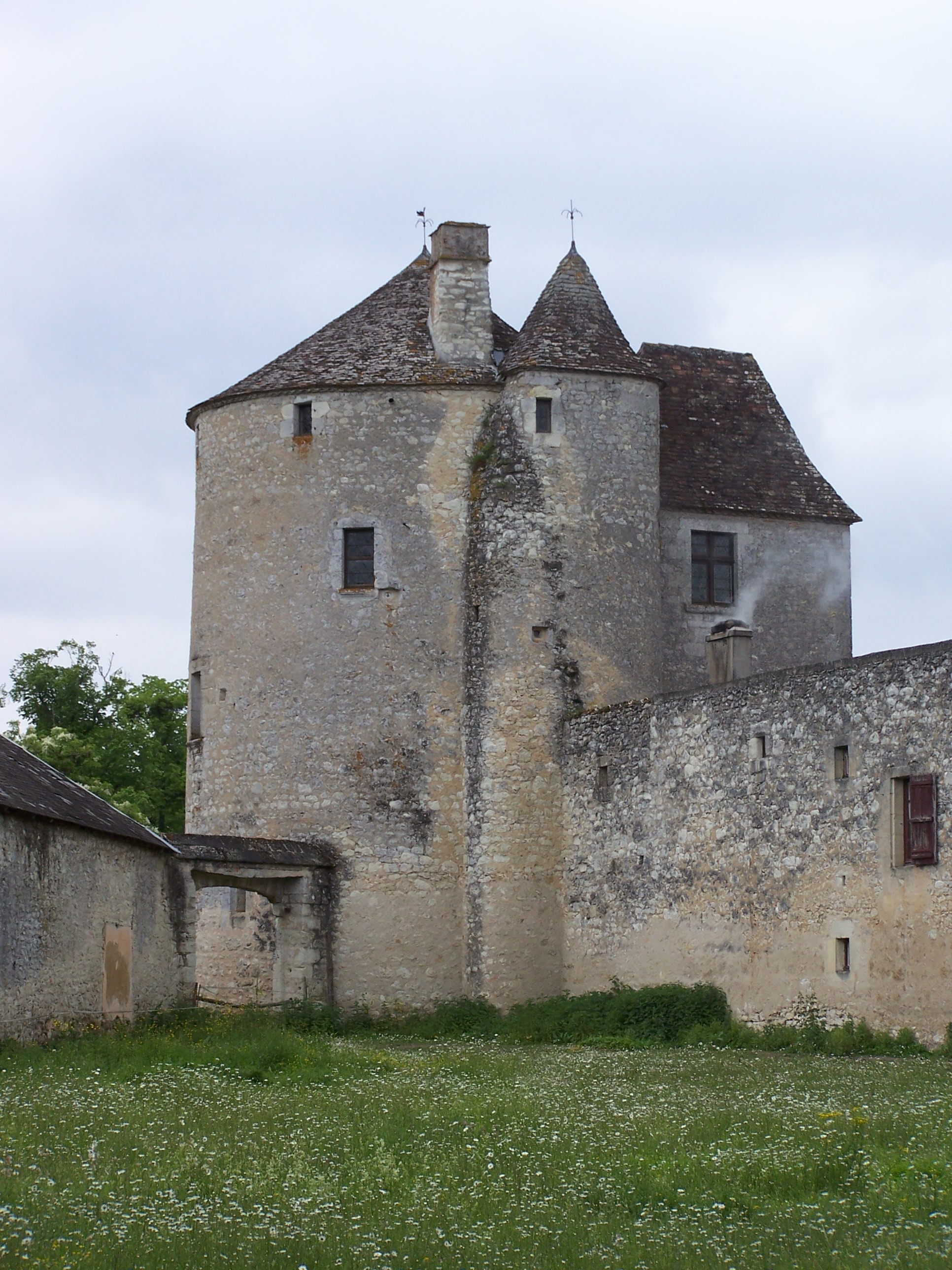
The tower from the inside courtyard

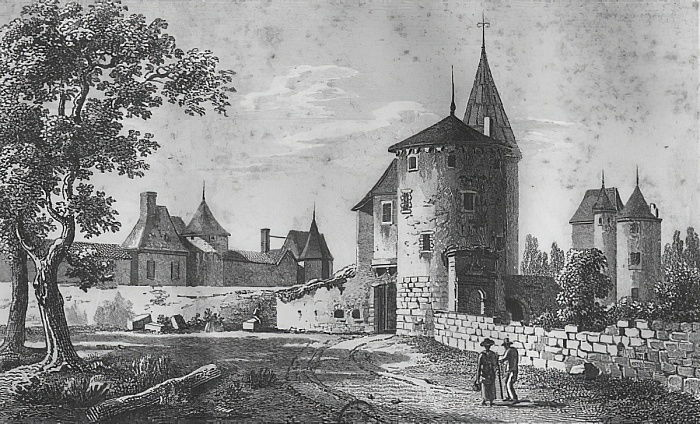
View of the château by Jean-Jérôme Baugean (1764–1819) which emphasizes Montaigne's tower and shows the original state of the château before the fire in 1885

== Inside the tower ==
The round tower contains a chapel with a vaulted ceiling on the first floor, while the second floor was used as a bedroom. Conduits hidden between the first and second floor transmit sounds with good fidelity, which allowed Montaigne to hear Mass without leaving his bedroom in his old age. The third floor contains a small room which served as the library in Montaigne's time, and a square corps de logis three meters long by two and a half wide which was used as a study by Montaigne. While the corps de logis was almost entirely covered in paintings in Montaigne's life, only traces of the seccos subsist to this day.

=== The tower in Montaigne's time ===
Scholars have long noted that the tower's physical environment influenced Montaigne's writing; Montaigne himself elaborates on the importance of the library for his writing in the third essay of the third part of the Essays. Montaigne did not simply use the books in his library for inspiration, but he was also stimulated by the paintings and maxims painted all over its walls and ceilings, as shown by the usage in the Essays of citations drawn from the room's paintings. The extent and nature of this influence remains however difficult to ascertain: while early critics may have conjectured a stylistic correspondence between the proliferating decorations and Montaigne's exuberant writing, more recent scholarship tends to insist on Montaigne's personal approach to the inspiration provided by the paintings and maxims surrounding him or on the way its physical arrangement, "a structure based on comparison and contrast," reflects Montaigne's associative reading tendencies.

==== The library ====
Forty-six of its forty-eight oak joists, as well as two supporting beams, were painted with Greek and Latin citations in Montaigne's time. These inscriptions are still visible today, although some of them cover earlier inscriptions. Visitors in the eighteenth century noted the presence of maxims on the boards of the library as well as on its shelves, but these are today erased. A dedication of the entire library to Montaigne's friend Étienne de La Boétie is also lost, as is the cabinet which contained over a thousand books.

The two load bearing beams bear eight inscriptions from skeptic authors, mostly from Sextus Empiricus. The forty-six joists, distributed on three rows, are inscribed with a total of sixty-seven sayings taken in their majority from the Bible and from classic authors (including Horace, Lucretius, Menander, and Sophocles). Many of these are mentioned in the Essays, either verbatim, in translation, or in paraphrase. Alain Legros argues that the order in which Montaigne would have encountered the quotations while walking in the room is perceptibly influential on the structure of some essays, notably the "Apology for Raymond Sebond." Later authors such as Grace Norton, Pierre Villey, Michel Butor and George Hoffmann have also discussed these quotations.

The library has been mentioned in travel accounts as early as from 1611, including one in English (John Sterling in 1836).

==== The study ====
The study, the only room in the tower to have a fireplace, contained most of the paintings commissioned by Montaigne. Painted a secco, they included "a landscape with Venus and Adonis, Mars and Venus surprised by Vulcan, Cimon suckled in prison by his daughter Pero, a shipwrecked sailor safely on shore beside a temple to Neptune, a figure with a lance before another temple, and a combat between soldiers (perhaps gladiators) in what might have been an amphitheater." Early accounts also report the presence of representations of the Judgment of Paris and of the burning of Troy, as well as a banquet scene, but these are not mentioned in accounts dating from the nineteenth century. A still visible Latin inscription, dated from the year 1571, dedicates the room " à sa liberté, à sa tranquillité et à son loisir" ("to his [Montaigne's] freedom, to his tranquility, and to his leisure").

Decorated in the ornamented style typical of French Mannerism style, the paintings and elaborate borders filled "every inch" of the available surface, including "ceiling beams, and ceiling." One of the central theme of the paintings gathered in the space seems to have been nudity, a question metaphorically at the heart of the writing project of the Essays.

== In culture ==
As a symbol of the tension between the writing imagination and the constraint of one's environment, the tower has appeared in the writings of many other writers than Montaigne. For instance, "Montaigne's Tower" is the title of a poem by Geoffrey Grigson, published in the 1984 collection Montaigne's Tower and Other Poems. It probes the relation between the writer, his immediate environment, and the compass of his imagination by imaging Montaigne at work in his library and looking out at the countryside surrounding the castle after asking its initial question: "Was it really here, in this tiled room In this tower, that Montaigne wrote?" Hilary Masters presents another take on a similar subject in his collection of essays published in 2000, In Montaigne's Tower. In recounting a visit to the tower, he notes the ways in which it is designed to provide for both spiritual and material needs, but for him constraints assert themselves over the freedom provided by the refuge: "Our imaginations, often falsely confirmed by memory, can cross many borders, but these escapes are doomed and freedom always lies just beyond".
