= Diana of Foix =

French noblewoman (c.1540-1587)

- Countess of Gurson
- Native name: Charlotte Diane de Foix-Candale
- Born: after 1540
- Died: 24 May 1587
- Spouse: Louis de Foix

Charlotte Diane de Foix-Candale (after 1540 – 24 May 1587) became the Comtesse of Gurson (in France) after her marriage in 1579 with Louis de Foix, who fell in the Battle of Montraveau on 29 July 1587. Michel de Montaigne dedicated the twenty-sixth of his Essais ("On the Education of Children") to her.

== Literature ==
- Wilkins, D.G.; Wilkins, R.L. (eds): The Search for a Patron in the Middle Ages and the Renaissance, Medieval and Renaissance Studies, Vol 12; Edwin Mellen Press 1996; ISBN 0-7734-8867-7.
