= Château de Montaigne =

Castle mansion in Dordogne, France

Coordinates: 44°52′42″N 0°1′48″E

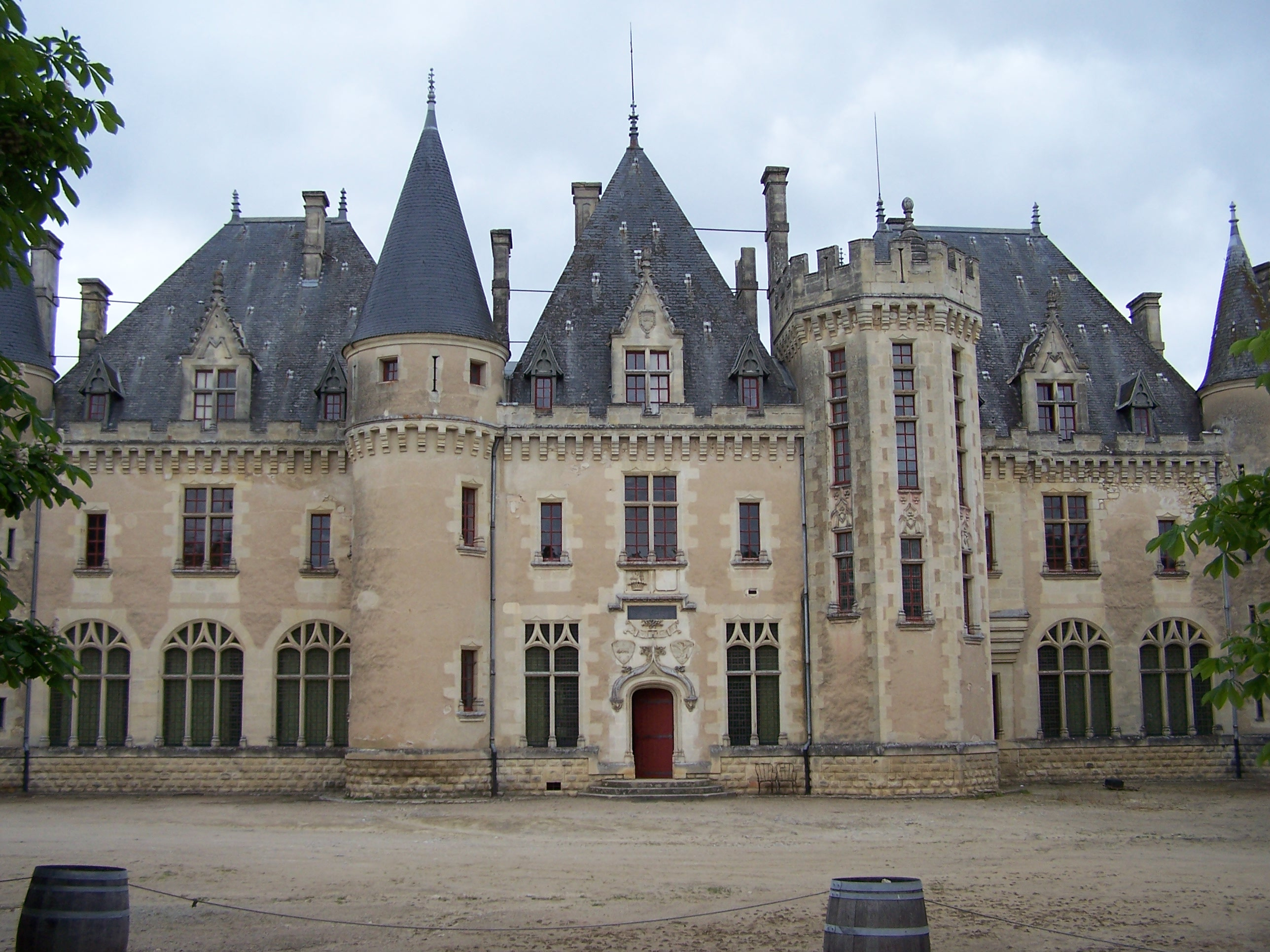
The western façade and the inner court.

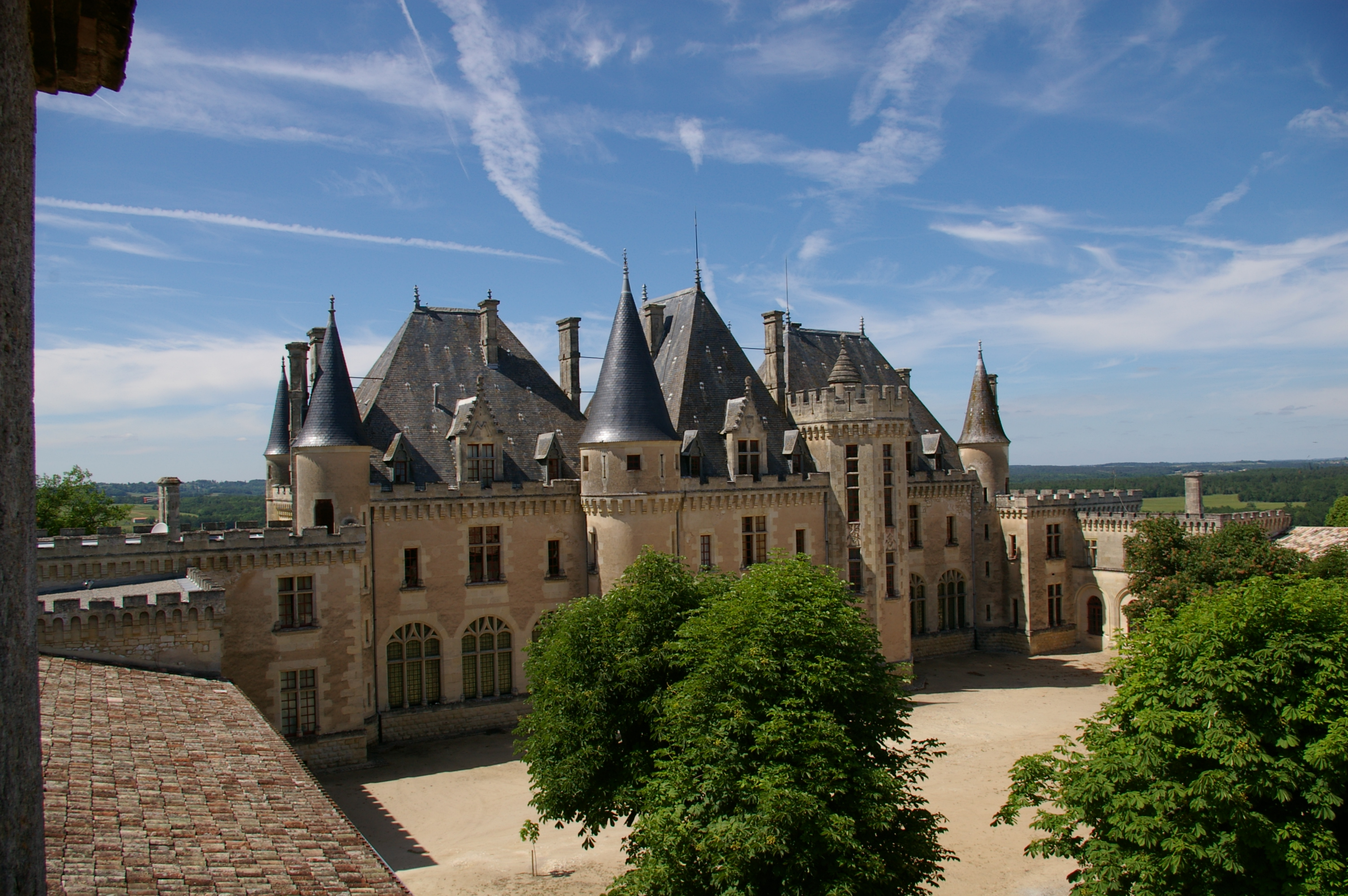
Exterior view

The Château de Montaigne is a castle mansion situated on the borders of Périgord and Bordelais, near Bergerac and Saint-Émilion, in the small commune of Saint-Michel-de-Montaigne in the Dordogne département of France. The structure originated in the 14th century and was the family residence of the Early Modern philosopher and thinker Michel de Montaigne.

== History ==
Built in the heart of a majestic park, whose layout was designed by the philosopher himself, the residence was acquired in 1477 by the great-grandfather of Michel, Ramon Eyquem, a Bordeaux trader, who thus acquired the hereditary title of Seigneur de Montaigne ("Lord of Montaigne").

Michel's father, Pierre Eyquem, settled in the castle with his family, and there Michel spent a studious childhood—he is said to have spoken Latin until the age of six—before leaving to continue his studies in French at the college of Guienne in Bordeaux.

In 1584, Montaigne entertained in his castle the king of Navarre, Henri de Bourbon, the future Henry IV, and thus became a close royal friend at the same time as Condé, de Rohan and Turenne. Henry IV had already named him gentleman of the chamber (French: gentilhomme de sa chambre) by letters patent in 1577.

From 1571 until his death in 1592, Michel de Montaigne wrote his famous Essays (French: Essais), major works of humanism of the renaissance, and fruits of a lifetime of reflection and reading.

After Montaigne's death, his widow Françoise de La Chassaigne continued to reside in the castle. She entertained there Marie de Gournay, whom he had befriended in 1588 during a voyage to Paris, and to whom he had sent an annotated copy of the Essays requesting that she take care of its publication (which did not happen until fifteen months later).

In 1860, Pierre Magne, minister of Napoleon III, bought the castle. He withdrew there after the 16 May 1877 crisis and became generally distant from the meetings of the Senate. He died of disease on 17 February 1879.

The castle was completely rebuilt after a fire that seriously damaged it in 1885.

== Architecture ==
The architecture of the extant chateau has a neo-renaissance flavour. After crossing the gate, one arrives in a square court surrounded by ramparts. The round tower of the library is the only vestige of the 16th century and is a popular location for visitors of the castle. It is said that Michel de Montaigne composed his Essays here.

Since 2009, Château de Montaigne has been listed as a monument historique by the French Ministry of Culture.

== See also ==
- List of castles in France
