= Raymond of Sabunde =

Catalan priest and philosopher (c. 1385–1436)

Raymond of Sabunde (born Ramon Sibiuda; also known as Sabiende, Sabond, Sabonde, Sebon, Sebond, Sebonde, or Sebeyde; c. 1385 – 29 April 1436) was a Catalan scholar, teacher of medicine and philosophy and finally regius professor of theology at Toulouse. He was born in Barcelona (at that time the major Catalan city of the Crown of Aragon), and died in Toulouse.

His Theologia Naturalis sive Liber naturae creaturarum, etc., written 1434–1436 but published in 1484, marks an important stage in the history of natural theology. It was first written in Latin (but not in a strictly classical Latin, since it contained plenty of Catalan-influenced Latin words). His followers composed a more classical Latin version of the work. It was translated into French by Michel de Montaigne (Paris, 1569) and edited in Latin at various times (e.g., Deventer, 1487; Strasburg, 1496; Paris, 1509; Venice, 1581, etc.).

The book was directed against the position then held by some, that reason and faith, philosophy and theology were antithetical and irreconcilable. Raymond declares that the Book of Nature and the Bible are both divine revelations, the one general and immediate, the other specific and mediate. Montaigne (Essays, bk. ii. ch. xii., "Apology for Raymond de Sebonde") tells how he translated the book into French and found "the conceits of the author to be excellent, the contexture of his work well followed, and his project full of pietie ... His drift is bold, and his scope adventurous, for he undertaketh by humane and naturall reasons, to establish and verifie all the articles of Christian religion against Atheists."

== Editions ==
The editio princeps of the book, which found many imitators, is undated but probably belongs to 1484; there are many subsequent editions, one by J. F. von Seidel as late as 1852. In 1595 only the Prologus was put on the Index Librorum Prohibitorum for its declaration that the Bible is not the only source of revealed truth.

A Latin edition said to be from 1480 and another from 1488 are available on Archive.org.

== Sources ==
- D. Beulet, Un Inconnu celebre: recherches historiques et critiques sur Raymond de Sabunde (Paris, 1875)
- Jean Henri Probst, Le Lullisme de Raymond de Sebonde (Toulouse, 1912)
- Mariàngela Vilallonga, Ramon Sibiuda in La literatura llatina a Catalunya al segle XV. Ed. Curial-Publicacions de l'Abadia de Montserrat, Barcelona 1993. ISBN 978-84-7256-930-0
- Jaume Puig, La filosofia de Ramon Sibiuda, Institut d'Estudis Catalans, Barcelona 1998. ISBN 978-84-7283-388-3
