= Saint-Michel-de-Montaigne =

- Commune
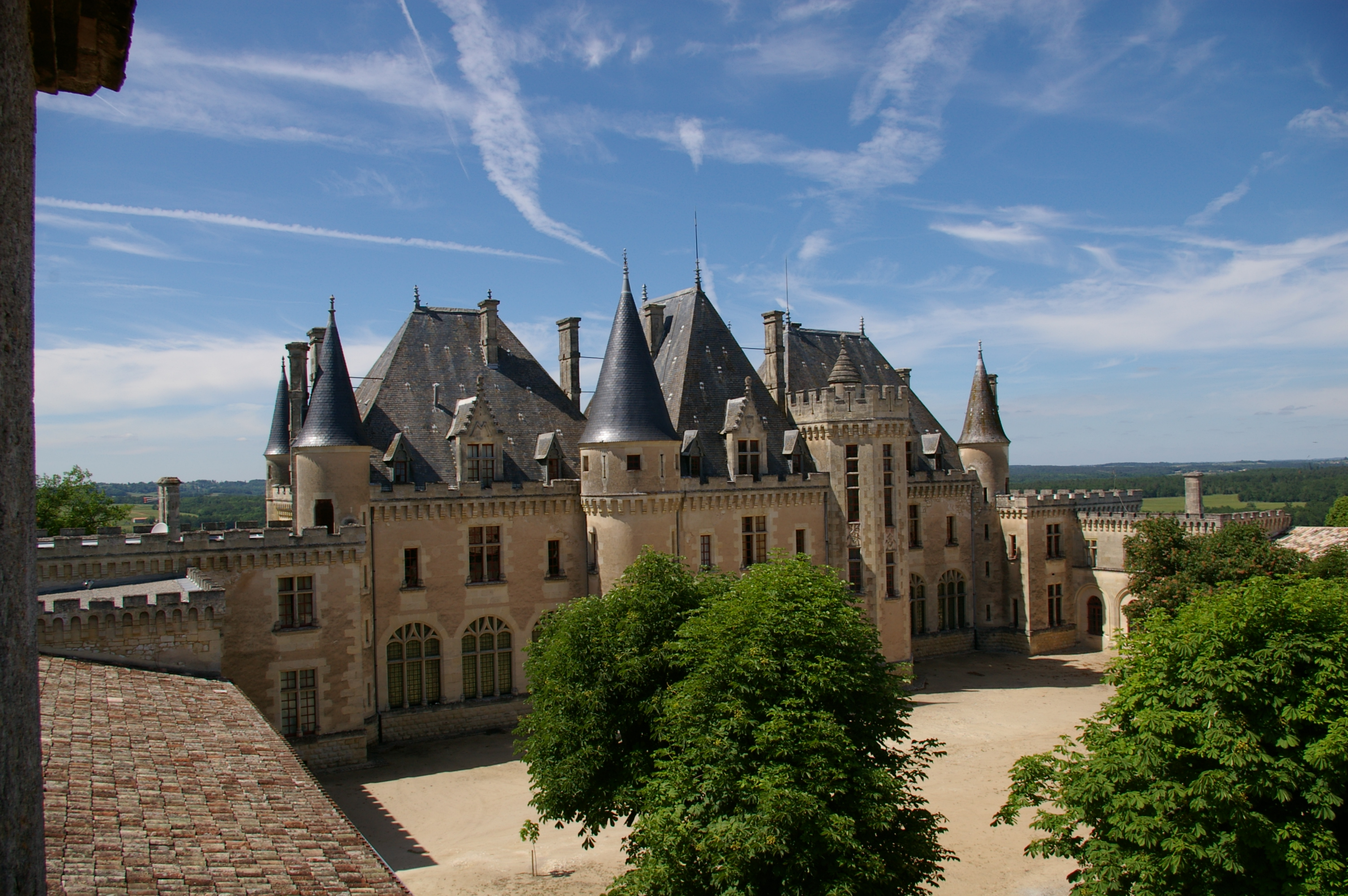
- Chateau de Montaigne
- Location of Saint-Michel-de-Montaigne
- Location within France Location within Nouvelle-Aquitaine
- Coordinates: 44°52′25″N 0°01′49″E
- Country: France
- Region: Nouvelle-Aquitaine
- Department: Dordogne
- Arrondissement: Bergerac
- Canton: Pays de Montaigne et Gurson

Government
  - Mayor (2020–2026): Gérard de Miras
- Area^{1}: 9.10 km^{2} (3.51 sq mi)
- Elevation: 70 m (230 ft)
- Highest elevation: 108 m (354 ft)
- Lowest elevation: 9 m (30 ft)
- Population (2023): 336
  - Density: 36.9/km^{2} (95.6/sq mi)
- Time zone: UTC+01:00 (CET)
  - Summer (DST): UTC+02:00 (CEST)
- INSEE/Postal code: 24466 /24230
- ^{1} French Land Register data, which excludes lakes, ponds, glaciers > 1 km^{2} (0.386 sq mi or 247 acres) and river estuaries.

Saint-Michel-de-Montaigne (French pronunciation: [sɛ̃ miʃɛl də mɔ̃tɛɲ]; Occitan: Sent Miquèu de Montanha) is a commune in the Dordogne department in Nouvelle-Aquitaine in southwestern France.

The Château de Montaigne, where the philosopher Michel de Montaigne lived in the 16th century, is situated in the commune.

== Population ==
Historical population
Year	Pop.	±% p.a.
1968	291	—
1975	283	−0.40%
1982	283	+0.00%
1990	292	+0.39%
1999	297	+0.19%
2007	354	+2.22%
2012	357	+0.17%
2017	337	−1.15%
2023	336	−0.05%
Source: INSEE

== See also ==
- Communes of the Dordogne department
