= Julien Le Paulmier =

French Protestant and physician

Julien Le Paulmier (1520 in Agneaux – 1588) was a French Protestant and physician.

Le Paulmier was born into a noble family which claimed the Capetian dynasty as their ancestors.

He studied at Caen and Paris and gained his doctorate in 1556; he worked in Paris until his exile during the French Wars of Religion.

He was physician to Charles IX of France and his brother Henry III of France.

He also taught at the University of Paris before retiring to the Pays d'Auge.

== Publications ==
- Traité de la nature et curation des playes de pistolle, harquebouse et autres bastons à feu, ensemble les remèdes des combustions et bruslures externes et superficielles ('Treatise on the Nature and Cure of Pistol Wounds, Harquebous, and Other Fire Wounds, Together with Remedies for External and Superficial Burns and Combustions') (1569)
- Bref discours de la praeservation, et curation de la peste ('A Brief Discourse on the Prevention and Cure of the Plague') in 1580.
- Traité du vin et du sidre ('A Treatise of Wine and Cider')

== Personal life ==
Le Paulmier was married twice; his second marriage to Marguerite welcomed four children. Their youngest child Jacques became a philologist.

His nephew Pierre was also a physician in Paris.
