= Bordeaux municipal library =

Central library of Bordeaux, France

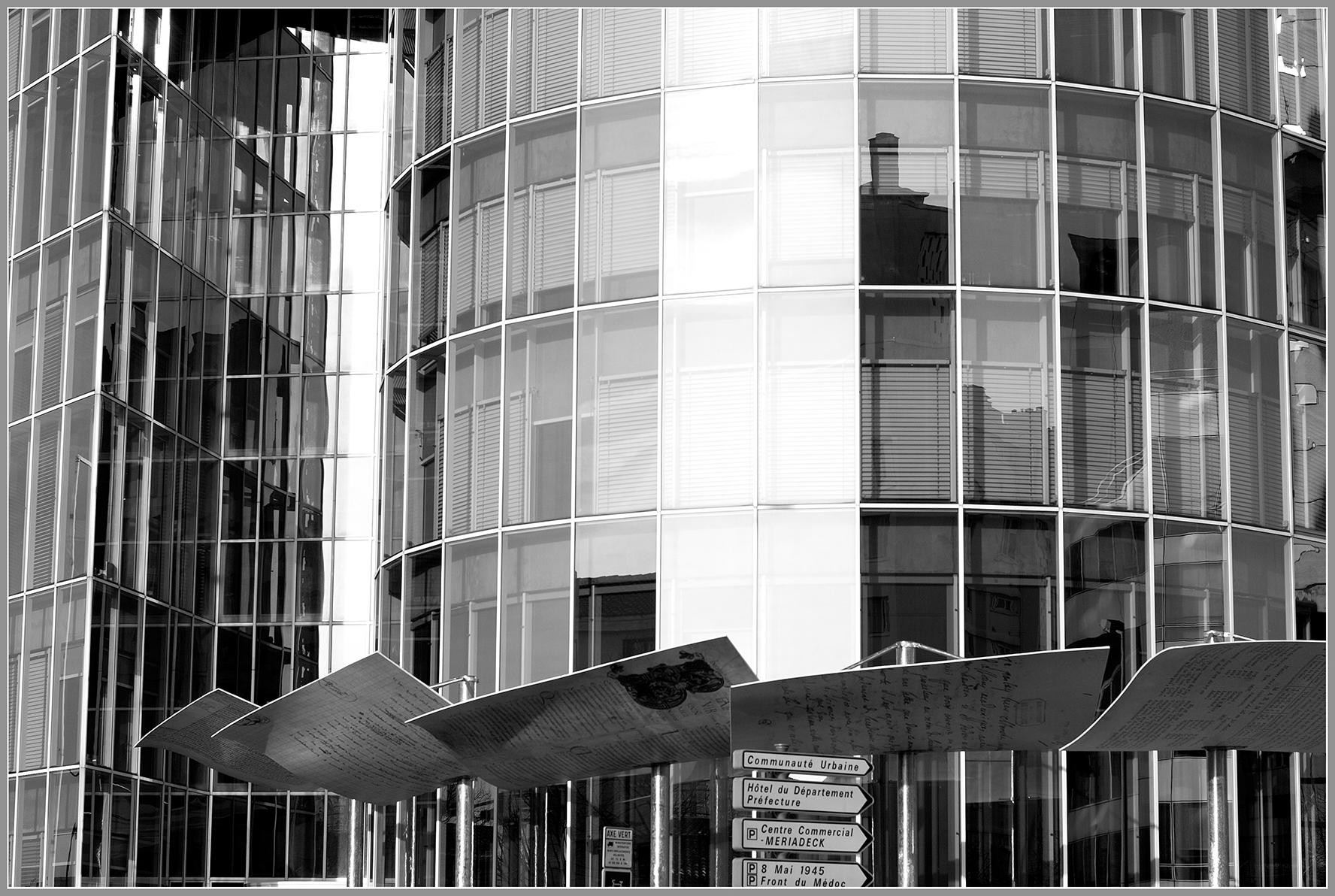
- 44°50′07″N 0°35′11″W
- Location: Bordeaux, Gironde, Aquitaine, France

Other information
- Website: bibliotheque.bordeaux.fr/accueil/

Bordeaux municipal library is the central library of Bordeaux, situated in the Mériadeck neighbourhood and linked to nine smaller libraries. It has noteworthy collections and rare documents which earn it a French government designation of classée (‘listed’), meaning it is a library of national significance.

== History ==
There has been a free public library in Bordeaux since 1740, when the collection of an intellectual and cultural society, the Academy of Bordeaux (l'Académie des sciences, belles-lettres et arts de Bordeaux), was merged with the personal library of a benefactor, Jean-Jacques Bel. Bel had been a friend since their schooldays of the philosopher Montesquieu, a key figure in the society. Two years before his death in 1738 he wrote a will leaving his mansion, other property, 3,000 books, manuscripts and scientific instruments to the academy on condition that its private library would move into the house and be open to all on three days a week. He provided for a professional librarian, and the new arrangements inspired more gentleman-scholars to donate to the library from 1743 onward.

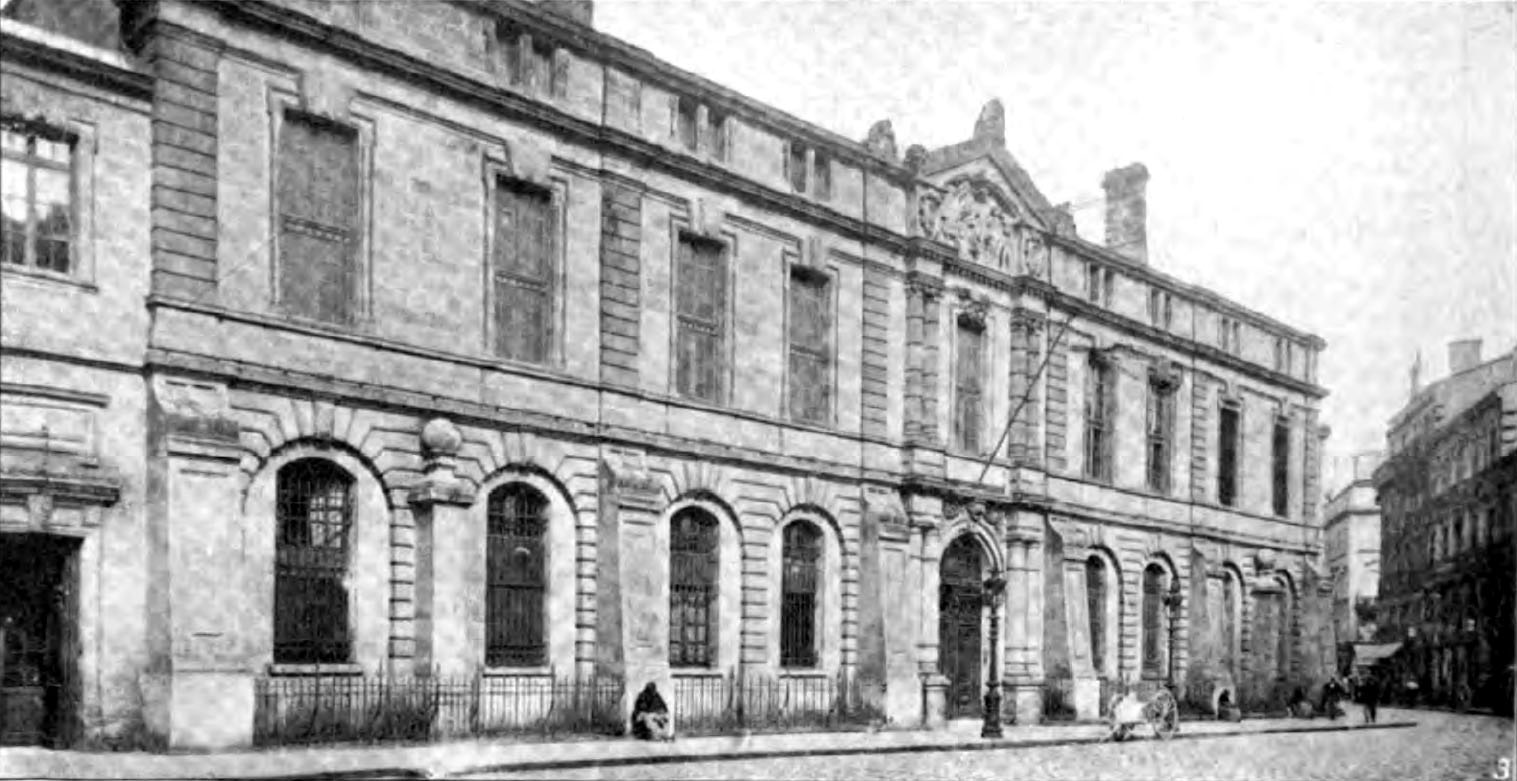
The library c. 1920, in the old monastery building

The French Revolution brought upheaval: a three-year closure, books sheltered in a monastery, demands from a revolutionary committee. The library's assets were first confiscated by the state, then assigned to the city in 1803. In that year a municipal library was established in the same mansion that had been home to the academy library, in the area of today's Allées de Tourny. After the best part of a century, in 1891, the library moved to a new site, a renovated monastery, and stayed there for yet another century until the current glass-faced building in Mériadeck was opened in 1991.

In 1936 the Bordeaux library was selected for a new government classification of bibliothèque municipale classée (ranked or listed municipal library) which applies to local libraries whose collections are considered to have national significance. This gives the French State legal rights and responsibilities with respect to conservation. As of 2016 Bordeaux is one of about 50 libraries with this ranking. Another development in the mid-20th century was the 1943 designation of legal deposit library for Aquitaine.

The current Mériadeck building is one of the biggest public libraries in France with 27,000 square metres of floor space holding more than a million texts. The interior was redesigned over several years from 2004, partly because of the removal of an unusual and ambitious robotic book retrieval system, something more often found in academic research libraries in the USA. It has been suggested this system was part of a "think big" approach requested by the city mayor. The "robot" ended up being slow and expensive to run, using money that might be better spent on other library concerns, particularly acquisition and digital development. Extra floor space was opened up when redesigning so that about 9,000 square metres became accessible to the public, who make more than 700,000 visits a year. The interior is now more inviting, light and spacious, with extra displays and more opportunities for visitors to browse.

== Collections ==
Montaigne's Essays: the 1588 Bordeaux copy

Over the centuries the library has acquired around half a million books, journals, manuscripts, pictures and other items representing the cultural heritage of Bordeaux, Aquitaine and beyond. These include some materials with a distinctly regional character, like books in Occitan, or views of local architecture by local photographers. Other library holdings have an international reputation, like the "Bordeaux copy" of Montaigne's Essays where handwritten notes on a printed edition of the essays give insight into the author's working method.

=== "The three Ms" ===
The library refers to Montaigne, Montesquieu and Mauriac as “the three Ms”: central figures in the literary and intellectual history of Bordeaux, and of the whole of France. Each is represented by important books, manuscripts and personal documents, some with the writer's signature. (See above for the Bordeaux copy of Montaigne's Essays.)

=== Medieval holdings ===
The library has over 300 incunabula (15th century printed books) from the earliest days of printing as well as remarkable individual manuscript items on parchment like an 11th-century Bible from the Abbey of Sauve-Majeure. and a 14th-century finely-illustrated translation of Livy.

=== Digitisation ===
The library's ongoing digitisation project is prioritising Bordeaux heritage, as well as making parts of the Montaigne and Montesquieu collections available in digital form. The project includes texts and illustrations relating to Bordeaux in the 18th century, when the town and the surrounding region went through a period of rapid development. 18th century architectural prints and 18th century newspapers are among the documents that have already been digitised. The library also offers online copies of 17th century periodicals including the Courrier Bordelois (Bordeaux Courier) dating back to 1649. Other subjects represented in the digital collection of historic documents are music and astronomy.

== See also ==
- List of libraries in France
