= Michel de Montaigne =

French author and philosopher (1533–1592)

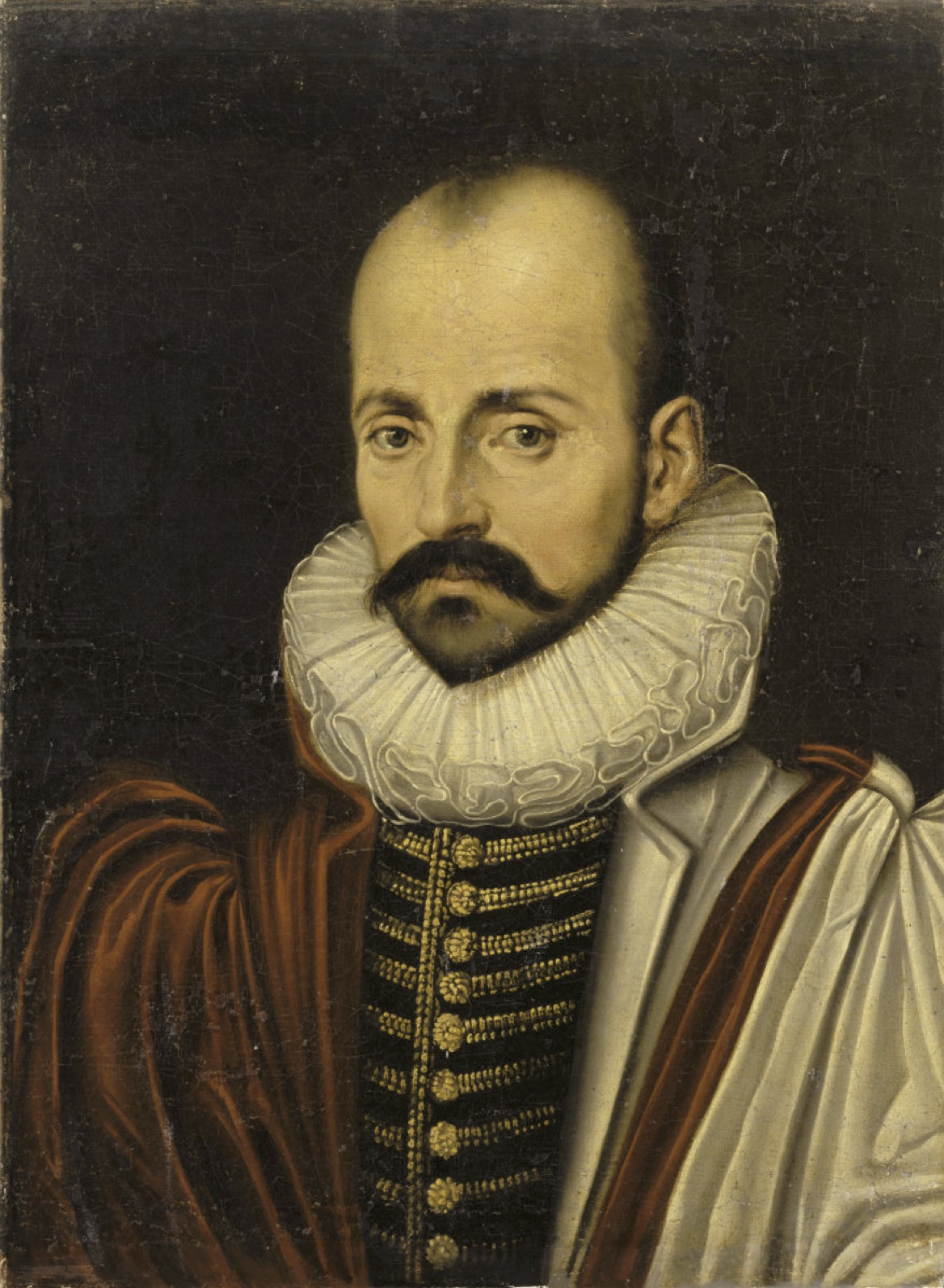
- Portrait of Montaigne, 1570s
- Born: Michel de Montaigne; 28 February 1533; Château de Montaigne, Guyenne, France
- Died: 13 September 1592 (aged 59); Château de Montaigne, Guyenne, France

Education
- Education: College of Guienne

Philosophical work
- Era: Renaissance philosophy; 16th-century philosophy
- Region: Western philosophy
- School: Counter-Reformation; French Renaissance; Nouveaux Pyrrhoniens; Renaissance humanism; Renaissance skepticism
- Main interests: Christianity; classical studies; ethics; human nature; pedagogy; philosophy of science; poetry; political history; sociability; virtue
- Notable ideas: Common herd; Essay-writing; Montaigne's wheel argument

Signature
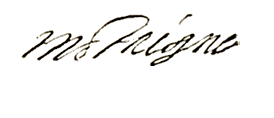

The coat of arms of Michel Eyquem, Lord of Montaigne

Michel Eyquem, Seigneur de Montaigne (Note: /mɒnˈteɪn/ mon-TAYN; Modern French: [miʃɛl ekɛm də mɔ̃tɛɲ]; Middle French: [miˈʃɛl ejˈkɛm də mõnˈtaɲə].) (28 February 1533 – 13 September 1592), commonly known as just Michel de Montaigne, was one of the most significant writers of the French Renaissance. He is known for popularising the essay as a literary genre. His work is noted for its merging of casual anecdotes and autobiography with intellectual insight. Montaigne had a direct influence on numerous writers of Western literature; his Essais contain some of the most influential essays ever written.

During his lifetime, Montaigne was admired as a statesman more than as an author. The tendency in his essays to digress into anecdotes and personal ruminations was seen as detrimental to proper style, rather than as an innovation; moreover, his declaration that "I am myself the matter of my book" was viewed by his contemporaries as self-indulgent. In time, however, Montaigne came to be recognised as embodying the spirit of critical thought and open inquiry that began to emerge around that time. He is best known for his sceptical remark, "What do I know?" ("Que sçay-je?" in Middle French; "Que sais-je?" in modern French).

== Biography ==
=== Family, childhood and education ===
Montaigne was born in the Guyenne (Aquitaine) region of France, on the family estate Château de Montaigne in a town now called Saint-Michel-de-Montaigne, near Bordeaux. The family was very wealthy. His great-grandfather Ramon Felipe Eyquem had made a fortune as a herring merchant and had bought the estate in 1477, thereby becoming the Lord of Montaigne. His father, Pierre Eyquem, Seigneur of Montaigne, was the mayor of Bordeaux and later a French Catholic soldier in Italy for a time.

Although there were several families having the patronym "Eyquem" in Guyenne, his father's family is thought to have had some degree of Marrano (Spanish and Portuguese Jewish) origins, while his mother, Antoinette López de Villanueva, was a convert to Protestantism. His maternal grandfather, Pedro López, from Zaragoza, came from a wealthy Marrano (Sephardic Jewish) family that had converted to Catholicism. His maternal grandmother, Honorette Dupuy, was from a Catholic family in Gascony, France.

Although Montaigne's mother lived nearby for much of his life – and even outlived him – she is mentioned only twice in his essays. Montaigne's relationship with his father, however, is often reflected on and discussed in the essays.

Montaigne's education began in early childhood and followed a pedagogical plan that his father had developed, refined by the advice of the latter's humanist friends. Soon after his birth, Montaigne was brought to a small cottage, where he lived for three years in the sole company of a peasant family; according to the elder Montaigne, this was to "draw the boy close to the people, and to the life conditions of the people, who need our help". After these first spartan years, Montaigne was returned to the château.

Another pedagogical objective was for Latin to become Montaigne's first language. His intellectual education was assigned to a German tutor (a doctor named Horstanus, who did not speak French). His father hired only servants who could speak Latin, and they also were given strict orders always to speak to the boy in Latin. The same rule applied to his mother, father, and servants, who were obliged to use only Latin words that he employed; thus they acquired a knowledge of the language that Montaigne's tutor taught him. His Latin education was accompanied by constant intellectual and spiritual stimulation. He was acquainted with Greek through a pedagogical method that employed games, conversation, and exercises with solitary meditation, rather than more traditional books.

The atmosphere of his upbringing engendered in Montaigne a spirit of "liberty and delight" that he would later describe as making him "relish...duty by an unforced will, and of my own voluntary motion...without any severity or constraint". His father instructed a musician to wake him every morning, playing one instrument or another; an epinettier (a player of a type of zither) was a constant companion to Montaigne and his tutor, playing tunes to alleviate boredom and tiredness.

Around 1539, Montaigne was sent to study at a highly-regarded boarding school in Bordeaux, the College of Guienne, then under the direction of the greatest Latin scholar of the era, George Buchanan; there Montaigne mastered the entire curriculum by the age of thirteen. He finished the first phase of his studies at the College in 1546. He then began to study law and entered a career in the local legal system. (His alma mater remains unknown, since little is certain about his activities from 1546 to 1557.)

=== Career ===
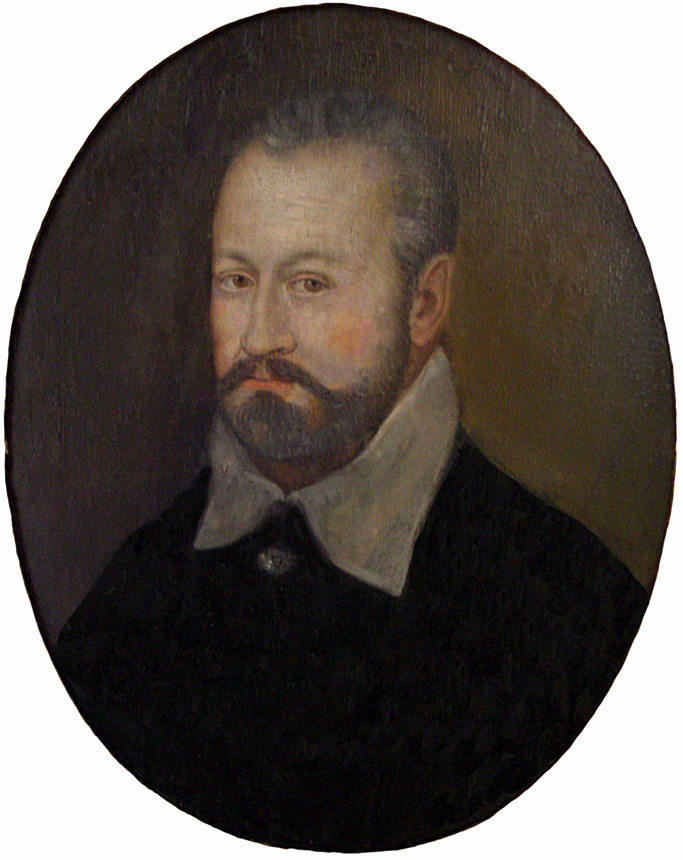
Portrait of Montaigne c. 1565, by an anonymous artist

Montaigne was a councillor of the Court des Aides of Périgueux, and in 1557 he was appointed councillor of the Parlement in Bordeaux, a high court. From 1561 to 1563, he was a courtier at the court of Charles IX, and he was with the king at the siege of Rouen (1562). He was awarded the highest honour of the French nobility, the collar of the Order of Saint Michael.

=== Friendship with Étienne de La Boétie ===
While serving at the Bordeaux Parlement, Montaigne became a close friend of the humanist poet Étienne de La Boétie. La Boétie was three years older than Montaigne and was already entrusted with important political responsibilities, including the pacification of Guyenne during the unrest of 1561. His best-known work is Discourse on Voluntary Servitude. Montaigne had initially intended to include it in the Essays, but refrained when Protestant circles began interpreting the work as an attack on the Catholic monarchy.

Montaigne and La Boétie's friendship became legendary. In the first edition of the Essays, Montaigne wrote:

If you press me to say why I loved him, I can say no more than because it was he, because it was I.

This famous phrase appeared in the posthumous 1595 edition known as the "Bordeaux Copy." Montaigne had added it in the margins of his personal 1588 edition—first "because it was he," then in different ink, "because it was I."

Although sociable and surrounded by many friends, Montaigne considered this friendship exceptional—one that only occurs "once every three centuries":

Our souls mingled and blended with each other so completely that they effaced the seam that had joined them.

Montaigne's admiration for La Boétie's intellectual greatness was matched by deep cultural affinities and a shared ideological harmony, especially in the context of the French Wars of Religion.

The greatest man I have known... for the natural goodness and capacity of his soul and for a well-born upbringing, was Étienne de La Boétie. It was truly a full soul, and of a beautiful composition in every respect; a classical soul, which would have produced great achievements if fate had allowed it. For it had enriched those fine natural gifts with study and learning.

But just four years after their meeting, La Boétie died—likely of plague or tuberculosis—in 1563. During his three days of agony, he displayed a strength of soul that deeply moved Montaigne. Montaigne first described this in a letter to his father, then in a Discourse published in 1571 as a postface to La Boétie's collected works.

There is no action or thought in which I do not miss him. I was already so habituated and accustomed to being second everywhere, that it seems to me I am no longer whole.

Donald M. Frame, in the introduction to his book The Complete Essays of Montaigne, suggested that Montaigne's "imperious need to communicate" after losing La Boétie led him to begin the Essais as a new "means of communication", in which "the reader takes the place of the dead friend".

Montaigne then sought to perpetuate his friend's memory—first by publishing his writings addressed to prominent figures, and then by continuing their dialogue internally, a dialogue that would ultimately become the Essays.

=== Marriage ===
Montaigne married Françoise de la Cassaigne in 1565, probably in an arranged marriage. She was the daughter and niece of wealthy merchants in Toulouse and Bordeaux. The couple had six daughters, but only the second-born, Léonor, survived infancy. He wrote very little about the relationship with his wife, and little is known about their marriage. Of his daughter Léonor, he wrote: "All my children die at nurse; but Léonore, our only daughter, who has escaped this misfortune, has reached the age of six and more, without having been punished, the indulgence of her mother aiding, except in words, and those very gentle ones." His daughter married François de la Tour and later Charles de Gamaches. She had a daughter with each husband.

=== Writing ===
After a request from his father, Montaigne began work on the first translation of the Catalan monk Raymond Sebond's book Theologia naturalis ("Natural Theology"), which he published a year after his father's death in 1568. In 1595, Sebond's Prologue was put on the Index Librorum Prohibitorum ("Index of Forbidden Books"), because of its declaration that the Bible is not the only source of revealed truth. Montaigne also published a posthumous edition of the works of his friend Boétie.

In 1570, he moved back to the family estate, the Château de Montaigne, which he had inherited. He thus became the Lord of Montaigne. Around this time, he was seriously injured in a riding accident on the château grounds, when one of his mounted companions collided with him at full speed, throwing Montaigne from his horse and briefly knocking him unconscious. His recovery took weeks or months, and this close brush with death apparently affected him greatly, as he discussed it at length in writings during the following years. Soon after the accident, he relinquished his magistracy in Bordeaux; his first child was born (and died a few months later); and by 1571, he had completely retired from public life to the tower of the château – his so-called "citadel" – where he almost fully isolated himself from all social and family matters. Sealed in his library, which contained a collection of some 1,500 volumes, he began work on the writings that would later be compiled into his Essais ("Essays"), first published in 1580. On the day of his 38th birthday, as he began this almost ten-year period of self-imposed seclusion, he had the following inscription placed on the crown of the bookshelves in his work chamber:

In the year of Christ 1571, at the age of thirty-eight, on the last day of February, his birthday, Michael de Montaigne, long weary of the servitude of the court and of public employments, while still entire, retired to the bosom of the learned virgins, where in calm and freedom from all cares he will spend what little remains of his life, now more than half run out. If the fates permit, he will complete this abode, this sweet ancestral retreat; and he has consecrated it to his freedom, tranquility, and leisure.

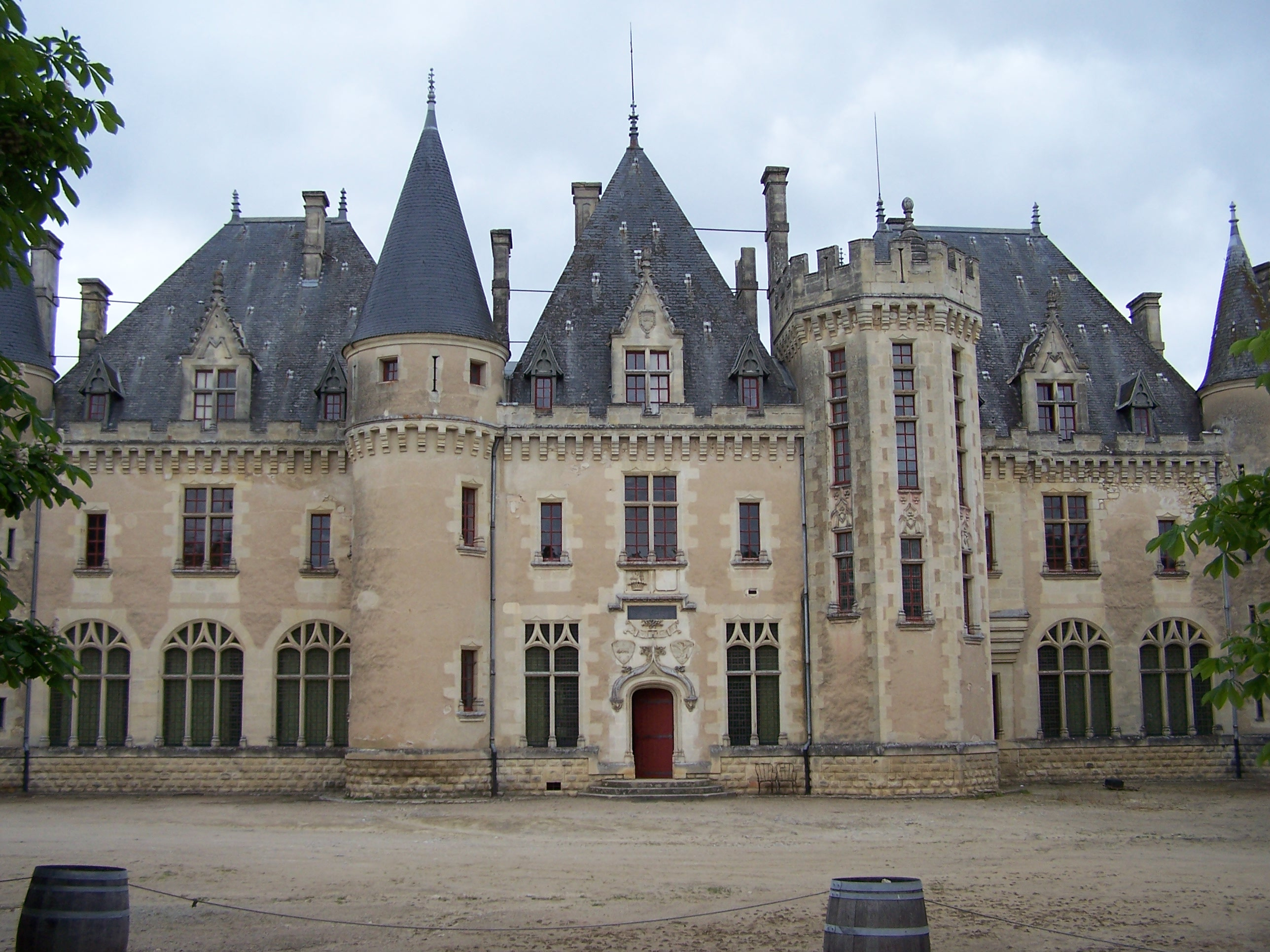
Château de Montaigne, a house built on the land once owned by Montaigne's family. His original family home no longer exists, although the tower in which he wrote still stands.

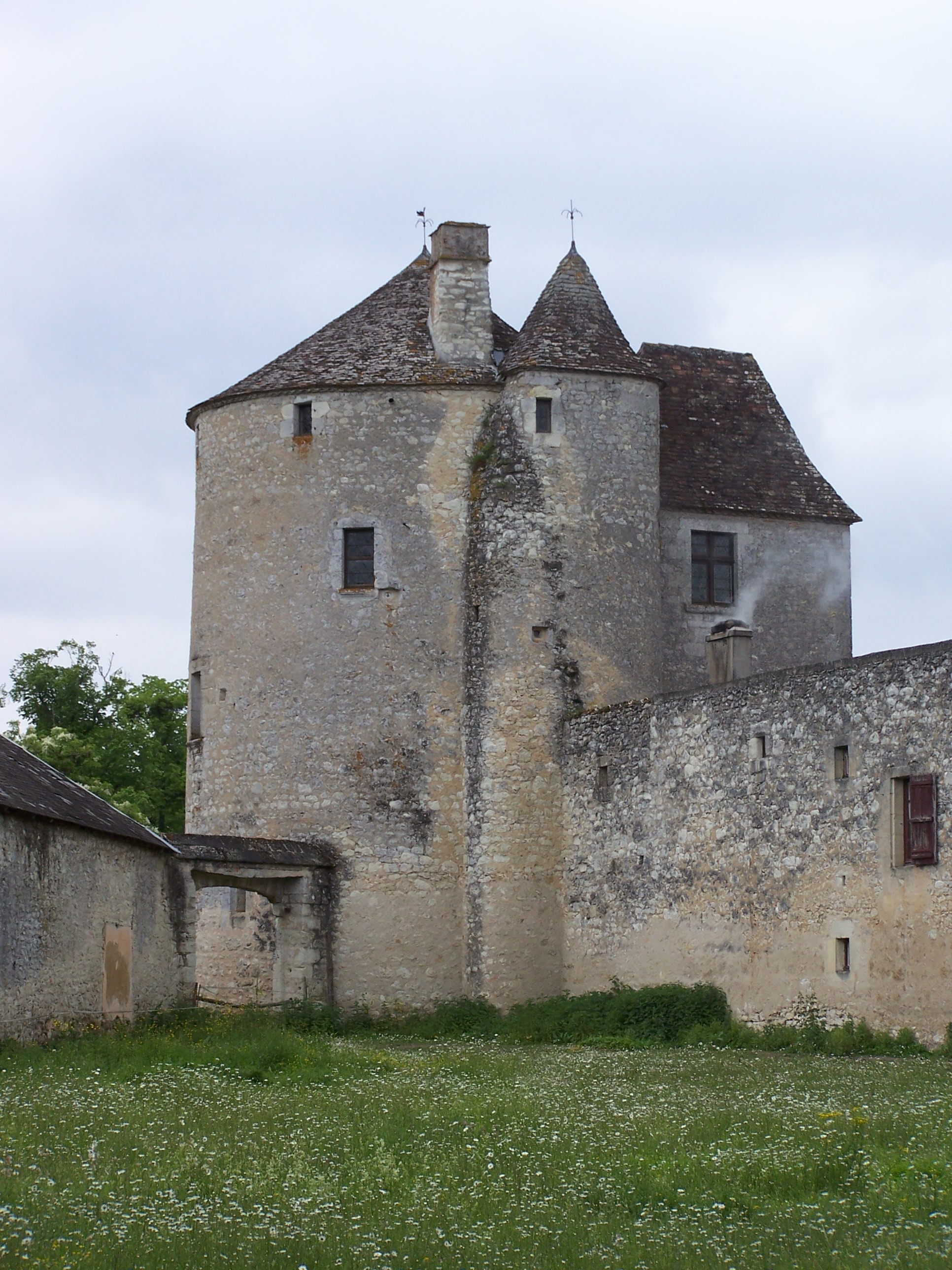
The Tour de Montaigne (Montaigne's tower), where Montaigne's library was located, remains mostly unchanged since the sixteenth century.

=== Travels ===
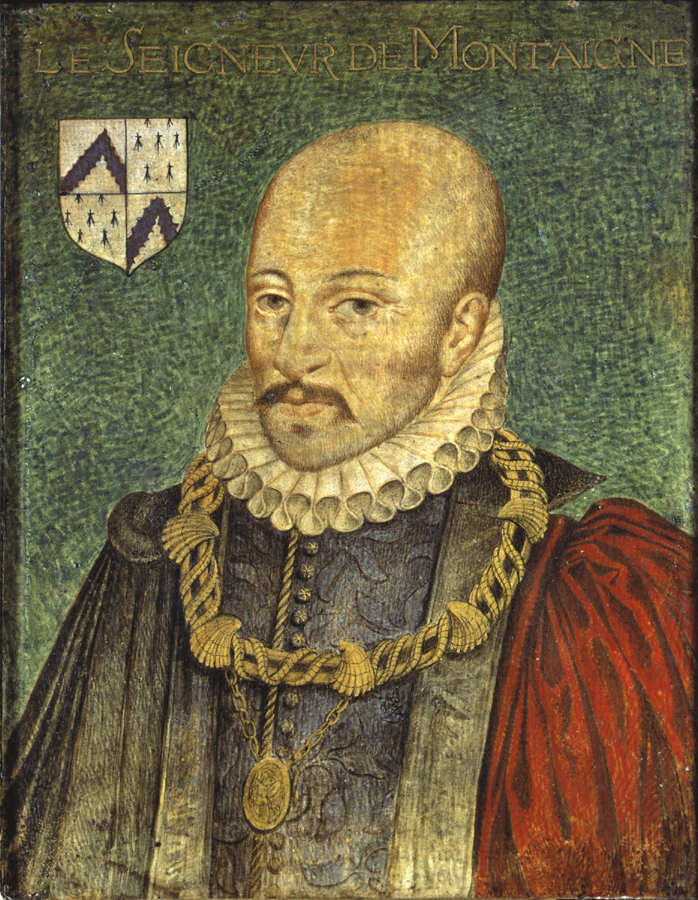
Portrait of Michel de Montaigne around 1578 by Daniel Dumonstier

During the Wars of Religion in France, Montaigne, a Roman Catholic, acted as a moderating force; he was respected both by the Catholic King Henry III and the Protestant Henry of Navarre, who later converted to Catholicism.

In 1578, Montaigne, whose health had always been excellent, began to suffer from painful kidney stones, a tendency he had inherited from his father's family. Throughout this illness, he avoided doctors and drugs. From 1580 to 1581, Montaigne traveled in France, Germany, Austria, Switzerland, and Italy – partly in search of a cure – establishing himself at the commune of Bagni di Lucca in Italy, where he visited the springs. His journey was also a pilgrimage to the Holy House of Loreto, to which he donated a silver relief, considering himself fortunate that it would be hung on a wall in the shrine; the relief depicted his wife, their daughter, and him kneeling before the Madonna. He maintained a journal in which he recorded regional differences and customs, in addition to a variety of personal episodes, including the dimensions of the kidney stones that he succeeded in expelling. This journal was published nearly two hundred years later, in 1774, after its discovery in a trunk displayed in his tower.

During a visit to the Vatican that Montaigne described in his journal, the Essais were examined by Sisto Fabri, who served as Master of the Sacred Palace under Pope Gregory XIII. After Fabri examined the Essais, the text was returned to Montaigne on 20 March 1581. Montaigne had apologised for references to the pagan concept of fortuna, as well as for writing favorably about Julian the Apostate and heretical poets; Montaigne was released to follow his own conscience in making alterations to the text.

=== Later career ===
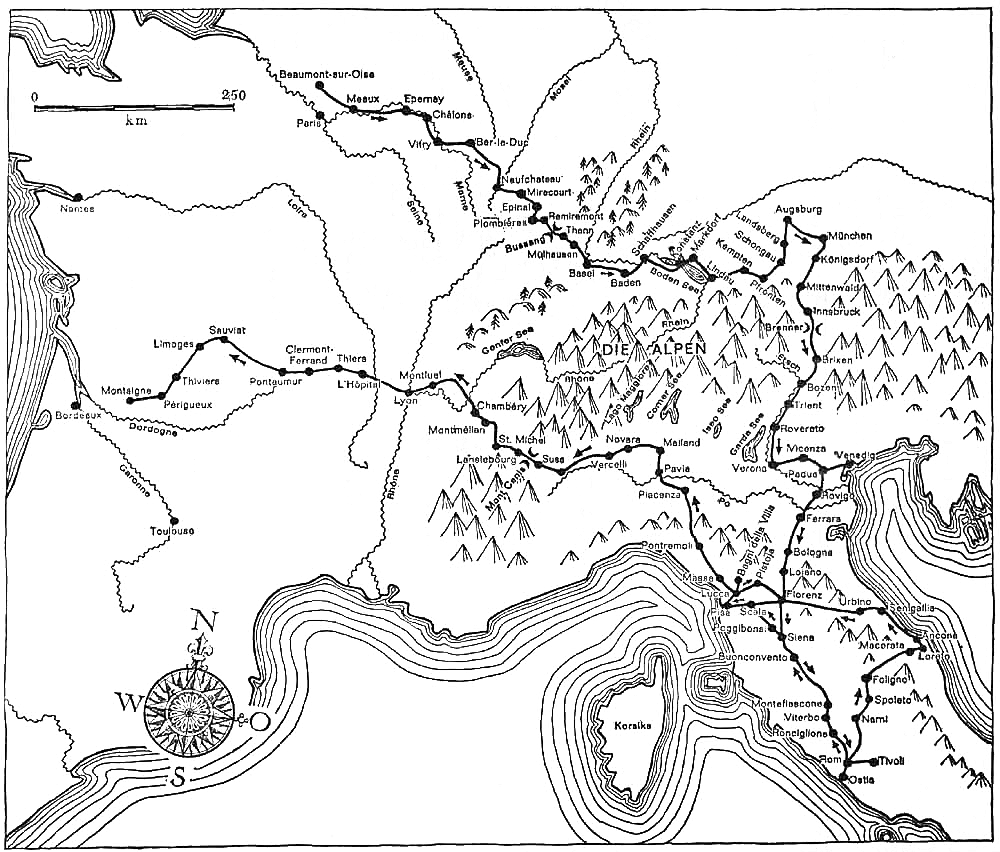
Journey to Italy by Michel de Montaigne 1580–1581

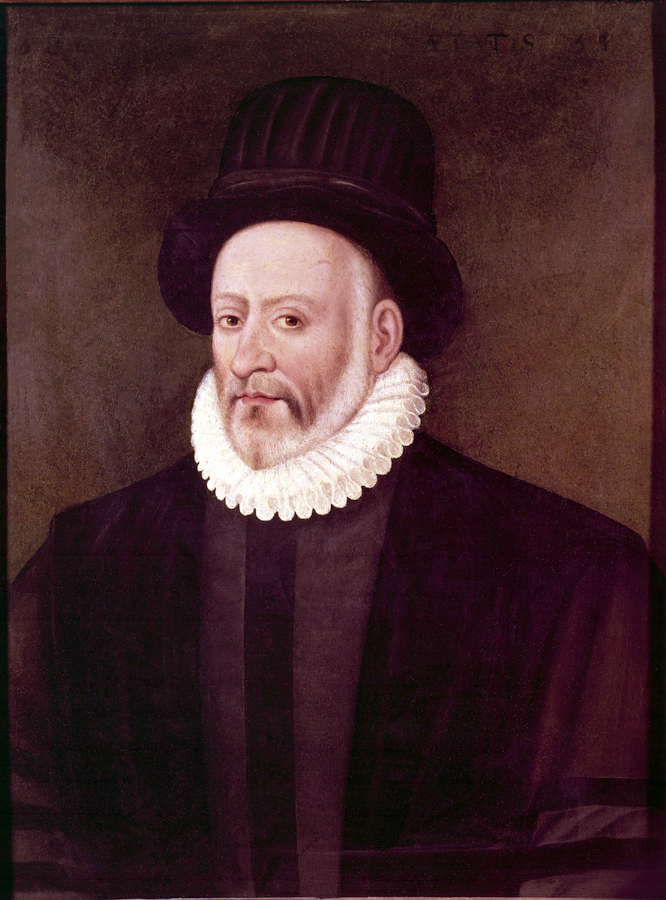
Portrait of 1587 by Étienne Martellange

While in the city of Lucca in 1581, Montaigne learned that he had been elected mayor of Bordeaux, like his father before him. He therefore returned to the city and served in this office. He was re-elected in 1583 and served until 1585, again moderating between Catholics and Protestants. The bubonic plague pandemic broke out in Bordeaux toward the end of his second term in office, in 1585. In 1586, the plague and the French Wars of Religion prompted him to leave his château for two years.

Montaigne continued to extend, revise, and oversee the publication of the Essais. In 1588, he wrote its third book; he also met Marie de Gournay, an author who admired his work, and who later edited and published it. Montaigne later referred to her as his adopted daughter.

When King Henry III was assassinated in 1589, Montaigne was anxious to promote a compromise that would end the bloodshed, despite his aversion to the cause of the Reformation; he therefore supported Henry of Navarre, who would later become King Henry IV. Montaigne's position associated him with the politiques, the establishment movement that prioritised peace, national unity, and royal authority over religious allegiance.

=== Death ===
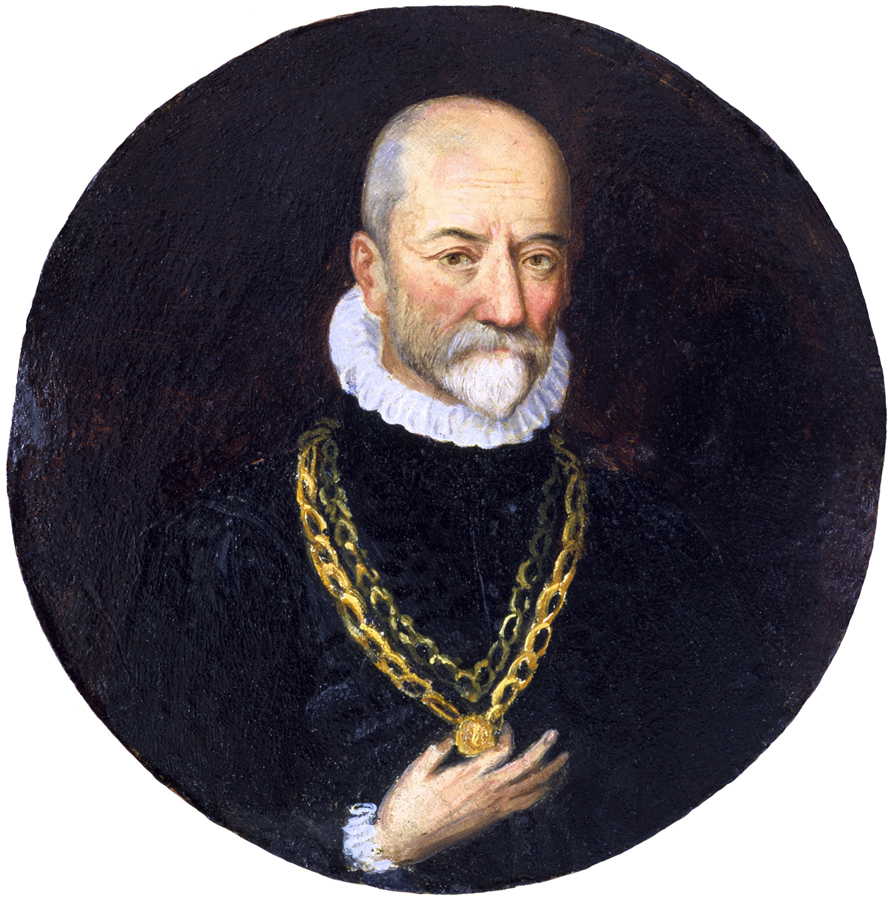
Portrait of Montaigne c. 1590 by an anonymous artist

Montaigne died in 1592 at the age of 59, at the Château de Montaigne, from a peritonsillar abscess. In his case, the disease "brought about paralysis of the tongue", especially difficult for a person who once said that "the most fruitful and natural play of the mind is conversation. I find it sweeter than any other action in life; and if I were forced to choose, I think I would rather lose my sight than my hearing and voice." Remaining in possession of all his other faculties, he requested a Mass, and he died during the celebration of that Mass.

Montaigne was buried near the château. His remains were later moved to the church of Saint Antoine at Bordeaux. This church no longer exists – it became the Convent des Feuillants, which has since disappeared as well.

== Essais ==
Montaigne's humanism is expressed in his Essais (published in 1580), a large collection of short, subjective essays on various topics; these essays were inspired by his studies in the classics, especially the works of Plutarch and Lucretius. Montaigne's stated goal was to describe humans, and especially himself, with complete frankness.

Inspired by considering the lives and ideals of leading figures of his age, Montaigne finds the most basic feature of human nature to be its great variety and volatility. He describes his own poor memory; his ability to solve problems and mediate conflicts without getting deeply involved emotionally; his disdain for the human pursuit of enduring fame; and his attempts to detach himself from worldly things to prepare for his approaching death. He also writes about his disgust with the religious conflicts of the time. He believed that humans are unable to attain true certainty. The longest of his essays, Apology for Raymond Sebond, marks his adoption of Pyrrhonism and contains the famous motto, "What do I know?"

Montaigne considered marriage necessary for raising children, but he disliked feelings of passionate love, because he saw them as detrimental to freedom. In education, he favored concrete examples and experience over abstract knowledge that is intended to be accepted uncritically. His essay "On the Education of Children" is dedicated to Diana of Foix.

The Essais exerted a significant influence on both French and English literature, shaping thought as well as style. Francis Bacon's Essays, published more than a decade later (first in 1597), are usually assumed to reflect direct influence by Montaigne's collection, and Montaigne is cited by Bacon alongside other classical sources in later essays.

== Montaigne's influence on psychology ==
Although not a scientist, Montaigne made observations on topics in psychology. In the essays, he developed and explained his observations on these themes. His thoughts and ideas covered subjects such as thought, motivation, fear, happiness, child education, experience, and human action. Montaigne's ideas have influenced psychology and are a part of its rich history.

=== Child education ===
Among the psychological topics that Montaigne addressed was the education of children. His essays "On the Education of Children", "On Pedantry", and "On Experience" explain his views on this subject. Some of these views are still relevant today.

Montaigne's views on child education were in opposition to common practices during his time. He found fault with both the content and the style of teaching. Much education at the time focused on reading the classics and learning through books. Montaigne disagreed with learning only through books. He believed that children must be educated in a variety of ways. He also disagreed with the way that information was presented to students – encouraging them to take educational content as absolute truth. Students were denied an opportunity to question information. By contrast, Montaigne generally believed that effective learning required a student to take new information and make it their own:

Let the tutor make his charge pass everything through a sieve and lodge nothing in his head on mere authority and trust: let not Aristotle's principles be principles to him any more than those of the Stoics or Epicureans. Let this variety of ideas be set before him; he will choose if he can; if not, he will remain in doubt. Only the fools are certain and assured. "For doubting pleases me no less than knowing." [Dante]. For if he embraces Xenophon's and Plato's opinions by his own reasoning, they will no longer be theirs, they will be his. He who follows another follows nothing. He finds nothing; indeed he seeks nothing. "We are not under a king; let each one claim his own freedom." [Seneca]. ... He must imbibe their way of thinking, not learn their precepts. And let him boldly forget, if he wants, where he got them, but let him know how to make them his own. Truth and reason are common to everyone, and no more belong to the man who first spoke them than to the man who says them later. It is no more according to Plato than according to me, since he and I see it in the same way. The bees plunder the flowers here and there, but afterward they make of them honey, which is all and purely their own, and no longer thyme and marjoram.

Fundamentally, Montaigne believed that the selection of a good tutor was important for a student's becoming well educated. Education by a tutor should be conducted at the student's pace. Montaigne believed that a tutor should be in dialogue with a student, allowing the student to speak first. A tutor also should allow for discussion and debate. Such dialogue was meant to create an environment in which students would teach themselves. They would be able to recognize their own mistakes and correct them as needed:

Let him be made to understand that to confess the flaw he discovers in his own argument, though it be still unnoticed except by himself, is an act of judgment and sincerity, which are principal qualities he seeks... that to change his mind and correct himself, to give up a bad position at the height of his ardor are rare, strong, and philosophical qualities.

Individualised learning was integral to his theory of child education. He argued that a student combines previously-known information with what is newly learned, and thereby forms a unique perspective on the new information. Montaigne also believed that tutors should encourage student's natural curiosity and allow them to question things. He postulated that successful students were encouraged to question new information and study it for themselves, rather than merely accepting what they had heard from experts on a given topic. Montaigne believed that a child's curiosity could serve as an important teaching tool when the child is allowed to explore subjects that genuinely interest them.

In addition, Montaigne believed that experience was a key element of learning. Tutors needed to teach students through experience, rather than through rote memorization as often practised with book learning. Montaigne argued that students would otherwise become passive adults, uncritically obedient and unable to think independently; no important knowledge would be retained, and no skills would be acquired. Montaigne believed that learning through experience was superior to learning through books. For this reason, he encouraged tutors to educate their students through practice, travel, and human interaction. By doing so, he argued, students would become active learners, who could claim knowledge for themselves.

Montaigne's views on child education continue to be influential today. Elements of his thinking have been integrated into modern educational practices. In summary, he argued against the popular teaching style of his time, encouraging individualised learning instead. He believed in the importance of experience over book learning and memorization. Ultimately, Montaigne asserted that the purpose of education was to teach a student how to lead a successful life by practising an active and socially interactive lifestyle.

== Related writers and influence ==
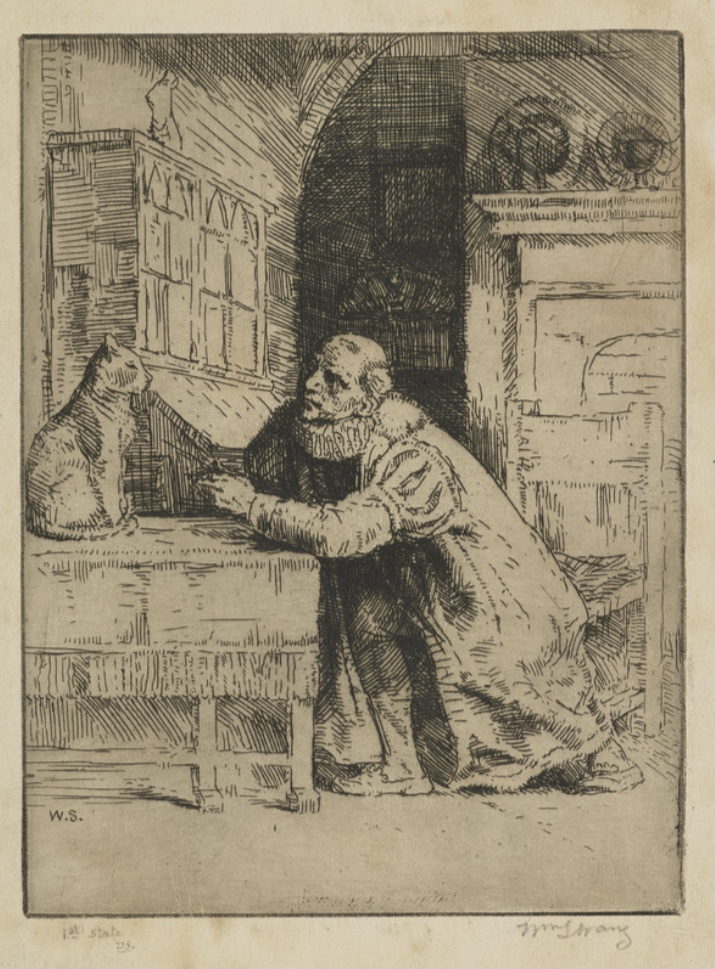
William Strang etching "Montaigne and his cat", 1902

Thinkers exploring ideas similar to Montaigne's include Erasmus, Thomas More, John Fisher and Guillaume Budé, who all worked about fifty years before Montaigne's time. Many of Montaigne's Latin quotations come from Erasmus' collection Adagia, and notably all of his quotations from Socrates. Plutarch may be Montaigne's strongest influence in terms of substance and style; there are more than 500 quotations from Plutarch in Montaigne's Essais.

Since Edward Capell first proposed the idea in 1780, scholars have pointed to Montaigne as an influence on William Shakespeare, who would have had access to John Florio's translation of Montaigne's Essais, published in English in 1603; a scene in Shakespeare's play The Tempest "follows the wording of Florio [translating Of Cannibals] so closely that his indebtedness is unmistakable". Most parallels between the two writers may be explained, however, as literary commonplaces; relative to works by Miguel de Cervantes and Shakespeare, similarities with writers in other countries could be due to shared study of Latin moral and philosophical writers, such as Seneca the Younger, Horace, Ovid, and Virgil.

Much of Blaise Pascal's scepticism in his Pensées has traditionally been attributed to his reading Montaigne. Pascal listed Montaigne and Epictetus as the two philosophers with whom he was most familiar.

The English essayist William Hazlitt expressed unlimited admiration for Montaigne, exclaiming that "he was the first who had the courage to say as an author what he felt as a man. ... He was neither a pedant nor a bigot. ... In treating of men and manners, he spoke of them as he found them, not according to preconceived notions and abstract dogmas". Beginning most clearly with essays in the familiar style in his own collection Table-Talk, Hazlitt sought to follow Montaigne's example.

The American philosopher Ralph Waldo Emerson chose "Montaigne; or, the Skeptic" as the subject of one lecture in a series titled Representative Men. Emerson said of his experience reading Montaigne that "It seemed to me as if I had myself written the book, in some former life, so sincerely it spoke to my thought and experience." He considers Montaigne "the frankest and honestest of all writers," and describes his Essays as "an entertaining soliloquy on every random topic that comes into his head; treating everything without ceremony, yet with masculine sense. There have been men with deeper insight; but, one would say, never a man with such abundance of thoughts: he is never dull, never insincere, and has the genius to make the reader care for all that he cares for."

The German philosopher Friedrich Nietzsche evaluated Montaigne as follows: "That such a man wrote has truly augmented the joy of living on this Earth". The French critic Charles Augustin Sainte-Beuve advised that "to restore lucidity and proportion to our judgments, let us read every evening a page of Montaigne." Stefan Zweig drew inspiration from one of Montaigne's quotations for the title of his polemical essay A Conscience Against Violence.

The American philosopher Eric Hoffer employed Montaigne in both style and thought. In his memoir, Truth Imagined, he said of Montaigne that "He was writing about me. He knew my innermost thoughts." The British novelist John Cowper Powys expressed admiration for Montaigne's philosophy in his books, Suspended Judgements (1916) and The Pleasures of Literature (1938). The American theorist Judith N. Shklar introduces her book Ordinary Vices (1984) as follows: "It is only if we step outside the divinely ruled moral universe that we can really put our minds to the common ills we inflict upon one another each day. That is what Montaigne did and that is why he is the hero of this book. In spirit he is on every one of its pages...".

The 20th-century literary critic Erich Auerbach called Montaigne the first modern man. In his book Mimesis (in Chapter 12), Auerbach writes that "Among all his contemporaries he had the clearest conception of the problem of man's self-orientation; that is, the task of making oneself at home in existence without fixed points of support".

== Possible discovery of remains ==
On 20 November 2019, the Musée d'Aquitaine announced that human remains found in the basement a year earlier might belong to Montaigne. Investigation of these remains, postponed because of the COVID-19 pandemic, resumed in September 2020. DNA and bone analysis and facial reconstructions point to the remains in all likelihood belonging to Montaigne, though until some of his descendants are identified for further DNA confirmation, the identification cannot be 100% sure.

== Commemoration ==
Montaigne's birthdate served as the basis for establishing National Essay Day in the United States.

The humanities branch of the University of Bordeaux is named after Montaigne: Université Michel de Montaigne Bordeaux 3.
