= Essays (Montaigne) =

Collection of works by Michel de Montaigne

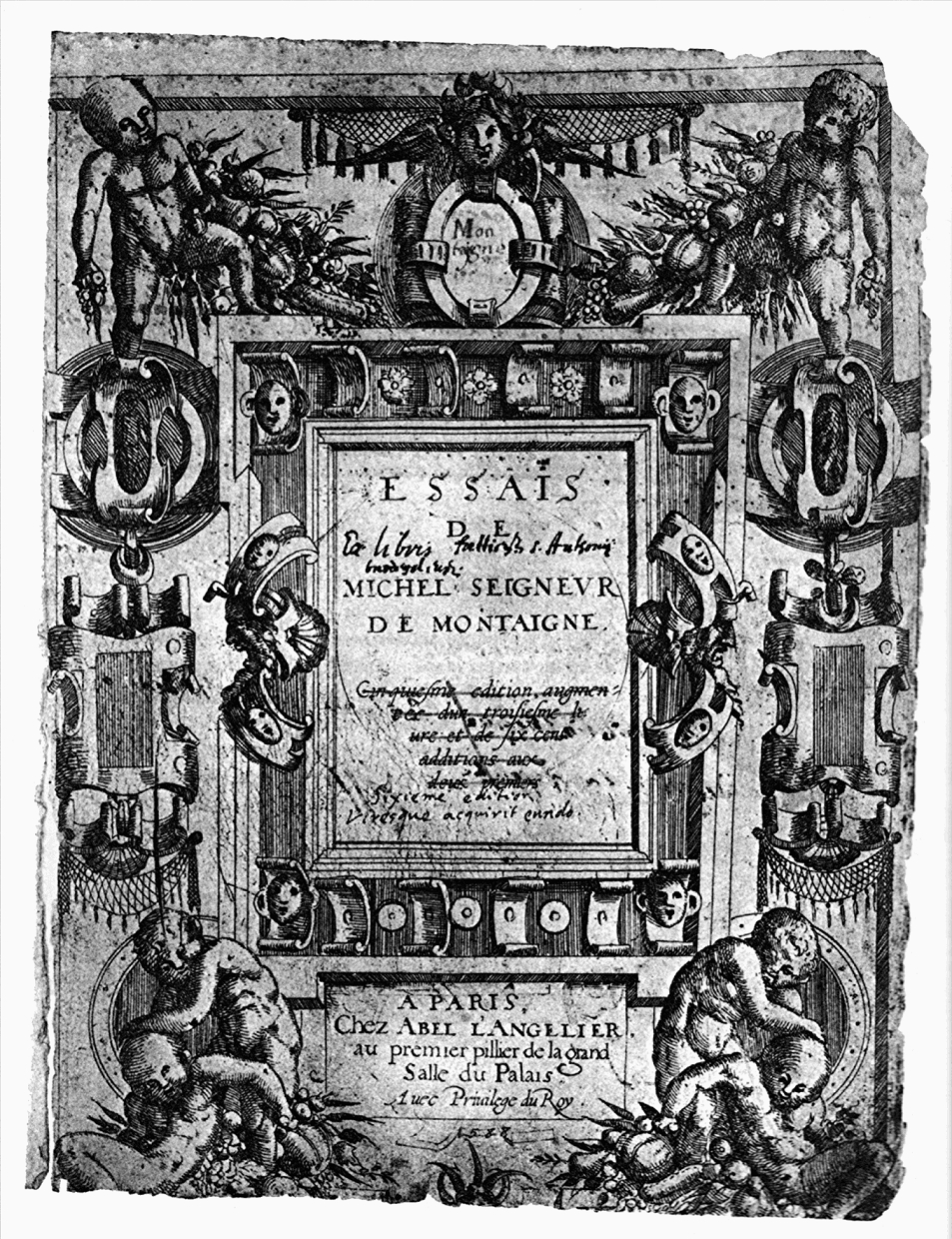
- Cover, circa 1588.
- Author: Michel de Montaigne
- Original title: Essais
- Language: Middle French
- Genre: Essay
- Publisher: Simon Millanges, Jean Richer
- Publication date: March 1580
- Publication place: Kingdom of France
- Text: Essays at Wikisource

The Essays (French: Essais, pronounced [esɛ]) of Michel de Montaigne are contained in three books and 107 chapters of varying length. They were originally written in Middle French and published in the Kingdom of France. Montaigne's stated design in writing, publishing and revising the Essays over the period from approximately 1570 to 1592 was to record "some traits of my character and of my humours." The Essays were first published in 1580 and cover a wide range of topics.

The Essais exercised an important influence on both French and English literature, in thought and style.

== Style ==
Montaigne wrote in a seemingly conversational or informal style that combines a highly literate vocabulary with popular sayings and local slang. The earlier essays are more formal and structured and sometimes quite short ("Of prognostications"), but later essays, and revisions to the essays in later editions, are longer and more complex. In his later style he freely associates one topic with another in the manner of a searching inquiry into an issue from different points of view. His thoughts are often supported with quotations from Ancient Greek, Latin, and Italian texts such as De rerum natura by Lucretius and the works of Plutarch. Furthermore, his Essays were seen as an important contribution to both writing form and skepticism. The name itself comes from the French word essais, meaning "attempts" or "tests", which shows how this new form of writing did not aim to educate or prove. Rather, his essays examine an enormous range of topics to reflect on the diversity of received opinions, the fallibility of human knowledge and the folly of certitude.

== Content ==
Montaigne's stated goal in his book is to describe himself with utter frankness and honesty ("de bonne foi", lit. "in good faith"). The insight into human nature provided by his essays, for which they are so widely read, is merely a by-product of his introspection. Though the implications of his essays were profound and far-reaching, he did not intend or suspect that his work would garner much attention outside of his inner circle, prefacing his essays with, "I am myself the matter of this book; you would be unreasonable to suspend your leisure on so frivolous and vain a subject."

Montaigne's essay topics spanned the entire spectrum of the profound to the trivial, with titles ranging from "Of Sadness and Sorrow" and "Of Conscience" to "Of Smells" and "Of Posting" (referring to posting letters). Montaigne wrote at the height of the French Wars of Religion (1562–1598) between Catholics and protestant Huguenots. Christianity in the 15th and 16th centuries saw Protestant authors consistently attempting to subvert Church doctrine with reason and scholarship. Consequently, some Catholic scholars embraced skepticism as a means to discredit all reason and scholarship and accept Church doctrine through faith alone.

Montaigne never found certainty in any of his inquiries into the nature of man and things, despite his best efforts and many attempts. He mistrusted the certainty of both human reason and experience. He reasoned that while man is finite, truth is infinite; thus, human capacity is naturally inhibited in grasping reality in its fullness or with certainty. Though he did believe in the existence of absolute truth, he believed that such truth could only be arrived at by man through divine revelation, leaving us in the dark on most matters. He finds the great variety and volatility of human nature to be its most basic features, which resonates with Renaissance thought about the fragility of humans. According to the scholar Paul Oskar Kristeller, "the writers of the period were keenly aware of the miseries and ills of our earthly existence". A representative quote of Montaigne is: "I have never seen a greater monster or miracle than myself."

Citing the case of Martin Guerre as an example, Montaigne believes that humans cannot attain certainty. His philosophical skepticism is best expressed in the long essay "An Apology for Raymond Sebond" (Book 2, Chapter 12) in which he embraced the philosophy of Pyrrhonism. Montaigne posits that we cannot trust our reasoning because thoughts just occur to us: we do not truly control them. Further, he says we do not have good reasons to consider ourselves superior to the animals. In the middle of the section normally entitled "Man's Knowledge Cannot Make Him Good", he wrote that his motto was "What do I know?" The essay on Sebond defended Catholicism. As in all of his essays, Montaigne eloquently employed many references and quotes from classical Greek and Roman authors, especially Lucretius.

Montaigne considered marriage necessary for the raising of children, but disliked the strong feelings of romantic love as being detrimental to freedom. One of his quotations is: "Marriage is like a cage; one sees the birds outside desperate to get in, and those inside desperate to get out."

In education, he favored concrete examples and experience over the teaching of abstract knowledge that is expected to be accepted uncritically. Montaigne's essay "On the Education of Children" is dedicated to Diana of Foix.

He opposed European colonization of the Americas, deploring the suffering it brought upon the natives.

== Chronology ==
Montaigne heavily edited the Essays at various points in his life. Sometimes he would insert just one word, while at other times he would insert whole passages. Many editions mark this with letters as follows:

- A: passages written 1571–1580, published 1580
- B: passages written 1580–1588, published 1588
- C: passages written 1588–1592, published 1595 (posthumously)

A copy of the fifth edition of the Essais with Montaigne's own "C" additions in his own hand exists, preserved at the Municipal Library of Bordeaux (known to editors as the Bordeaux Copy). This edition gives modern editors a text dramatically indicative of Montaigne's final intentions (as opposed to the multitude of Renaissance works for which no autograph exists). Analyzing the differences and additions between editions show how Montaigne's thoughts evolved over time. Remarkably, he does not seem to remove previous writings, even when they conflict with his newer views.

== Influence ==
The remarkable modernity of thought apparent in Montaigne's essays, coupled with their sustained popularity, made them arguably the most prominent work in French philosophy until the Enlightenment. Their influence over French education and culture is still strong. The official portrait of former French president François Mitterrand pictured him facing the camera, holding an open copy of the Essays in his hands.

Scottish journalist and politician J. M. Robertson argued that Montaigne's essays had a profound influence on the plays of William Shakespeare, citing their similarities in language, themes and structures.

== Chapters ==
Book 1

1. "That Men by Various Ways Arrive at the Same End"
2. "Of Sadness or Sorrow"
3. "That Our Affections Carry Themselves Beyond Us"
4. "That the Soul Expends Its Passions Upon False Objects"
5. "Whether the Governor Himself Go Out to Parley"
6. "That the Hour of Parley Is Dangerous"
7. "That the Intention is Judge of Our Actions"
8. "Of Idleness"
9. "Of Liars"
10. "Of Quick or Slow Speech"
11. "Of Prognostications"
12. "Of Constancy"
13. "The Ceremony of the Interview of Princes"
14. "That Men are Justly Punished for Being Obstinate"
15. "Of the Punishment of Cowardice"
16. "A Proceeding of Some Ambassadors"
17. "Of Fear"
18. "Not To Judge of Our Happiness Till After Death"
19. "That To Study Philosophy is to Learn to Die"
20. "Of Imagination"
21. "That the Profit of One Man is the Damage of Another"
22. "Of Custom; We Should Not Easily Change a Law Received"
23. "Various Events from the Same Counsel"
24. "Of Pedantry"
25. "Of the Education of Children"
26. "Folly to Measure Truth and Error by Our Own Capacity"
27. "Of Friendship"
28. "Nine and Twenty Sonnets of Estienne De La Boitie"
29. "Of Moderation"
30. "Of Cannibals"
31. "That a Man is Soberly to Judge of the Divine Ordinances"
32. "We are to Avoid Pleasures, Even at the Expense of Life"
33. "Fortune is Often Observed to Act by the Rule of Reason"
34. "Of One Defect In Our Government"
35. "Of the Custom of Wearing Clothes"
36. "Of Cato the Younger"
37. "That We Laugh And Cry for the Same Thing"
38. "Of Solitude"
39. "A Consideration Upon Cicero"
40. "Relish for Good and Evil Depends Upon Our Opinion"
41. "Not to Communicate a Man's Honour"
42. "Of the Inequality Amongst Us"
43. "Of Sumptuary Laws"
44. "Of Sleep"
45. "Of the Battle of Dreux"
46. "Of Names"
47. "Of the Uncertainty of Our Judgment"
48. "Of War Horses, or Destrier"
49. "Of Ancient Customs"
50. "Of Democritus and Heraclitus"
51. "Of the Vanity of Words"
52. "Of the Parsimony of the Ancients"
53. "Of a Saying of Caesar"
54. "Of Vain Subtleties"
55. "Of Smells"
56. "Of Prayers"
57. "Of Age"

Book 2

1. "Of the Inconstancy of Our Actions"
2. "Of Drunkenness"
3. "A Custom of the Isle of Cea"
4. "To-Morrow's a New Day"
5. "Of Conscience"
6. "Use Makes Perfect"
7. "Of Recompenses of Honour"
8. "Of the Affection of Fathers to Their Children"
9. "Of the Arms of the Parthians"
10. "Of Books"
11. "Of Cruelty"
12. "Apology for Raimond Sebond"
13. "Of Judging of the Death of Another"
14. "That Our Mind Hinders Itself"
15. "That Our Desires are Augmented by Difficulty"
16. "Of Glory"
17. "Of Presumption"
18. "Of Giving the Lie"
19. "Of Liberty of Conscience"
20. "That We Taste Nothing Pure"
21. "Against Idleness"
22. "Of Posting"
23. "Of Ill Means Employed to a Good End"
24. "Of the Roman Grandeur"
25. "Not to Counterfeit Being Sick"
26. "Of Thumbs"
27. "Cowardice the Mother of Cruelty"
28. "All Things Have Their Season"
29. "Of Virtue"
30. "Of a Monstrous Child"
31. "Of Anger"
32. "Defence of Seneca and Plutarch"
33. "The Story of Spurina"
34. "Observation on a War According to Julius Caesar"
35. "Of Three Good Women"
36. "Of the Most Excellent Men"
37. "Of the Resemblance of Children to Their Fathers"

Book 3

1. "Of Profit and Honesty"
2. "Of Repentance"
3. "Of Three Commerces"
4. "Of Diversion"
5. "Upon Some Verses of Virgil"
6. "Of Coaches"
7. "Of the Inconvenience of Greatness"
8. "Of the Art of Conference"
9. "Of Vanity"
10. "Of Managing the Will"
11. "Of Cripples"
12. "Of Physiognomy"
13. "Of Experience"

== English translations ==
- John Florio (1603)
- Charles Cotton (1685–6)
  - Later edited by William Carew Hazlitt (1877)
- George Burnham Ives (1925)
- E.J. Trechmann (1927)
- Jacob Zeitlin (1934–6)
- Donald M. Frame (1957–8)
- J. M. Cohen (1958)
- Michael Andrew Screech (1991)

== See also ==
- Essays (Francis Bacon)
