= La Montagne =

La Montagne or LaMontagne may refer to:

== Places ==
- La Montagne, Haute-Saône, a commune in the Haute-Saône department, France
- La Montagne, Loire-Atlantique, a commune in the Loire-Atlantique department, France
- La Montagne, Réunion, a settlement

== Other uses ==
- La Montagne (newspaper)
- La Montagne (surname)
- The Mountain, a radical political group of the French Revolution, often referred to as the Montagnards

== See also ==
- Maurice Lamontagne Institute, a marine science research institute in Mont Joli, Quebec, Canada
- Montagne (disambiguation)
- Montagnes (disambiguation)
- The Mountain (disambiguation)
