= 2000–01 Southern Hemisphere tropical cyclone season =

The 2000–01 Southern Hemisphere tropical cyclone season comprises three different basins. Their respective seasons are:

- 2000–01 South-West Indian Ocean cyclone season west of 90°E,
- 2000–01 Australian region cyclone season between 90°E and 160°E, and
- 2000–01 South Pacific cyclone season east of 160°E.
