= Montaigne (disambiguation) =

Montaigne may refer to:

== People ==
- Michel de Montaigne (1533–1582; Lord of Montaigne), a French philosopher
- Aaron Montaigne, American punk rocker for Antioch Arrow
- Antoinette Montaigne (born 1965), a politician of France and Central African Republic
- George Montaigne (1569–1628), English Anglican bishop
- Lawrence Montaigne (1931–2017), American actor
- Marion Montaigne (born 1980), French cartoonist
- Montaigne (musician) (born 1995), Australian musician

=== Characters ===
- William LaMontaigne Jr., a fictional character from the TV series Criminal Minds

== Places ==
- Montaigne (Natchez, Mississippi), USA; a historic building
- Château de Montaigne, Saint-Michel-de-Montaigne, Dordogne, Nouvelle-Aquitaine, France; a castle
- Avenue Montaigne, Paris, France; a street
- 8890 Montaigne, a main-belt asteroid

== Groups, organizations, companies ==
- Montaigne (record label), a French classical record company
- Naïve Montaigne or Montaigne, a record label of Naïve Records
- Bordeaux Montaigne University. Bordeaux, France; a university
- Institut Montaigne, a French nonprofit transpartisan thinktank
- Établissement Français d'Enseignement Montaigne, Cotonou, Benin; a French international school
- Lycée Montaigne (disambiguation), several schools

== Other uses ==
- Montaigne's tower, a castle tower
- "Montaigne", a 1999 song by Pinback off their eponymous album Pinback

== See also ==
- Canton of Pays de Montaigne et Gurson, Dordogne, Nouvelle-Aquitaine, France
- Avenue Montaigne (film), a 2006 film
- TransMontaigne, U.S. pipeline company
- Montagne (disambiguation)
- Mont (disambiguation)
