= La Montagne (surname) =

La Montagne or La Montagne or Lamontagne is a surname of French (Norman) origins but is possibly related to some surnames within Ireland and England. The word "montagne" in French translates as the word "mountain" in English. Also, there were French Huguenots who settled within the United Kingdom during the 16th and 17th centuries. Anglicized form of Gaelic Ó Manntáin ‘descendant of Manntán’, a personal name derived from a diminutive of manntach ‘toothless’. Notable people with the surname include:

- Armand LaMontagne (1938–2025), American sculptor
- Blanche Lamontagne-Beauregard (1889–1958), Canadian poet
- Cynthia Lamontagne (born 1966), American actress
- Francois Baquet Lamontagne (1646–1701), French soldier and Canadian pioneer
- Gilles Lamontagne (1919–2016), Canadian politician
- Gilles Lamontagne (baritone) (1924–1993), Canadian baritone
- Maurice Lamontagne (1917–1983), Canadian economist and politician
- Noel LaMontagne (born 1977), American football player
- Ovide Lamontagne (born 1957), American politician
- Ray LaMontagne (born 1973), American singer-songwriter
- Rene Morgan La Montagne, Sr. (1856–1910), American businessman
- Rene Morgan La Montagne, Jr. (1882–1948), American polo player
- Richie Lamontagne (born 1969), American boxer

== See also ==
- Manton (name)
