= 2000–01 South-West Indian Ocean cyclone season =

Cyclone season in the Southwest Indian Ocean

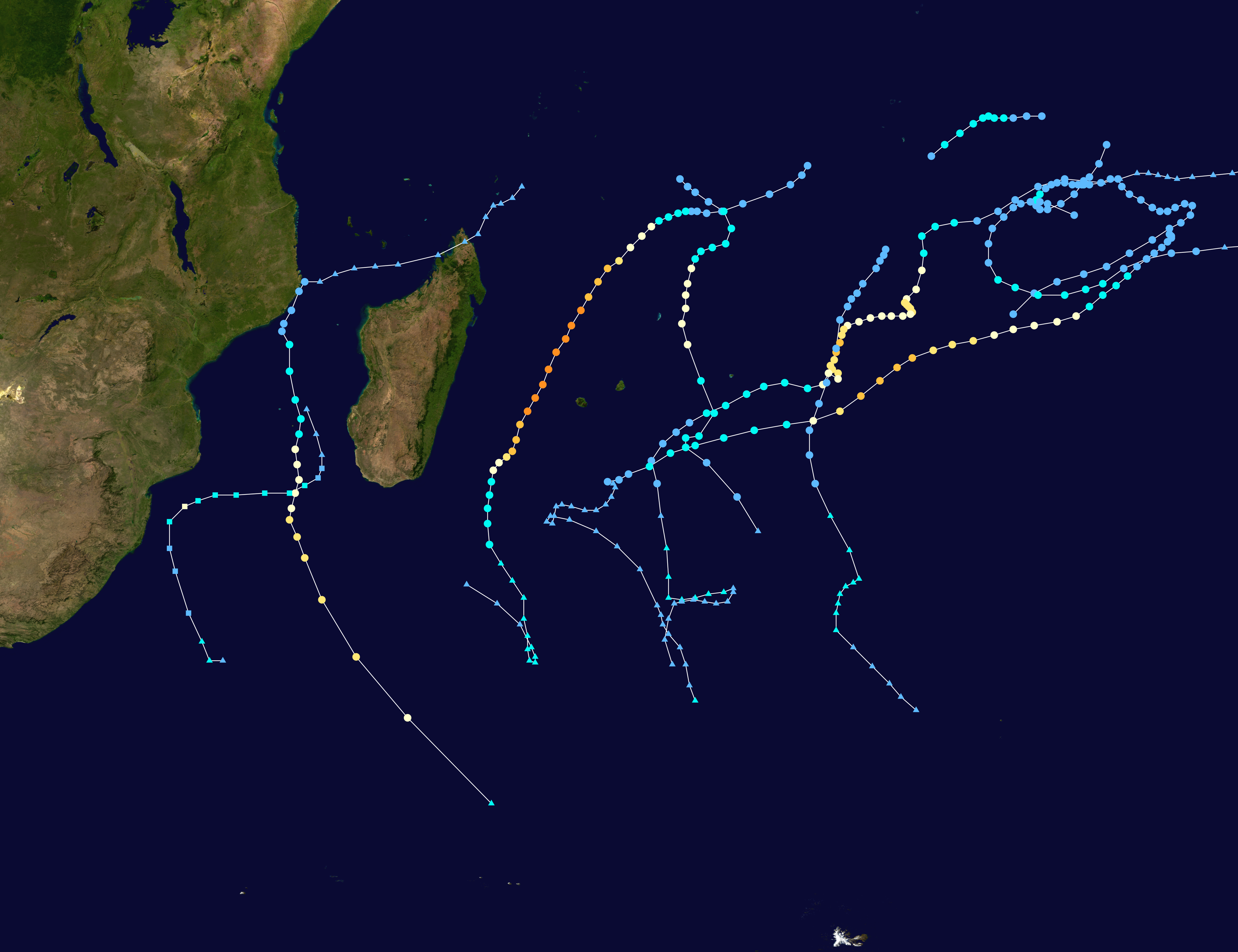
- Season summary map

Seasonal boundaries
- First system formed: August 1, 2000
- Last system dissipated: June 24, 2001

Strongest storm
- Name: Ando
  - Maximum winds: 195 km/h (120 mph) (10-minute sustained)
  - Lowest pressure: 925 hPa (mbar)

Seasonal statistics
- Total disturbances: 12
- Total depressions: 10
- Total storms: 7
- Tropical cyclones: 4
- Intense tropical cyclones: 2
- Total fatalities: 4
- Total damage: Unknown

Related articles
- 2000–01 Australian region cyclone season; 2000–01 South Pacific cyclone season

The 2000–01 South-West Indian Ocean cyclone season was a fairly quiet season with only five named storms, although there was an additional unnamed tropical storm and two subtropical cyclones with gale-force winds. It started early, with a tropical disturbance forming on August 1 – the first day of the cyclone year. However, the first named storm, Ando, was not named until January 2, which at the time was the 4th latest on record. Ando would become the most intense cyclone of the year, reaching peak winds of 195 km/h (121 mph) according to the Météo-France office (MFR) on Réunion, the official Regional Specialized Meteorological Center for the basin. The agency tracked storms south of the equator and west of 90°E to the east coast of Africa.

In addition to being the strongest storm, Cyclone Ando was one of two deadly storms during the season. It passed about 205 km (127 mi) west of Réunion, producing 1,255 mm (49.4 in) of rainfall in the mountainous peaks. The rains led to flooding that killed two people. Ando was one of three storms to attain tropical cyclone status – winds of at least 120 km/h (75 mph) – in the month of January. The others were Bindu, which alternated its trajectory several times over open waters, and Charly, which rapidly weakened after encountering hostile wind shear. The next storm to form was Tropical Cyclone Dera, which intensified near Mozambique in early March and killed two people there due to flooding rains. It later moved southward through the Mozambique Channel, maintaining its intensity unusually far to the south before becoming extratropical. There was a month of inactivity in March, including three weeks in which there were no storms worldwide, the first such instance. Subsequently, two storms formed in early April; one was a small, unnamed tropical storm, and the other was Severe Tropical Storm Evariste, which brought light rainfall to two islands. The season ended with an unusual subtropical storm forming rapidly in the southern Mozambique Channel on June 19, the only such storm to form in that body of water in the month. It became the strongest storm on record for so late in the season, although it weakened without affecting land, dissipating on June 24.

== Season summary ==
During the season, the Météo-France office (MFR) on Réunion island issued warnings in tropical cyclones within the basin. The agency estimated intensity through the Dvorak technique, and warned on tropical cyclones in the region from the coast of Africa to 90° E, south of the equator to 30° S. At the time, the cyclone year was from August 1 to July 31 of the subsequent year. The Joint Typhoon Warning Center (JTWC), which is a joint United States Navy – United States Air Force task force, also issued tropical cyclone warnings for the southwestern Indian Ocean in an unofficial capacity.

Aside from a tropical disturbance in August, the season began later than usual, the fourth consecutive season to do so. At the time it had the 4th latest start on record for the first named storm. Only about 20% of seasons have their first storm form after the middle of December, and the first named storm of this season, Ando, did not become a tropical storm until early January. However, January was active with three tropical cyclones, two of which became intense tropical cyclones, due to the active phase of the Madden–Julian oscillation (MJO). February returned to a period of inactivity, and generally there was minimal convection across the basin due to unusually dry air. This was spread by a powerful and persistent ridge that extended eastward from Madagascar, as well as an inactive phase of the MJO. Drought conditions occurred on Réunion due to the lack of rainfall. After three weeks of no tropical cyclones developing worldwide, an event unseen since 1995, the tropics became active again in early April.

In contrast with the busy preceding season, this season had much lower activity than usual, with only 36 days in which there was a tropical storm or cyclone active; this was 17 less than normal. However, the number of days with a tropical cyclone was slightly above normal at 15. In general, the southern hemisphere as a whole had the least active season since 1954. There were only five named storms, only the fifth such time since the beginning of the satellite era in 1967. As most storms formed toward the eastern periphery of the basin, damage was much less than the preceding year.

== Systems ==
=== Tropical Depression 01 ===
- Tropical depression (MFR)
- Tropical storm (SSHWS)
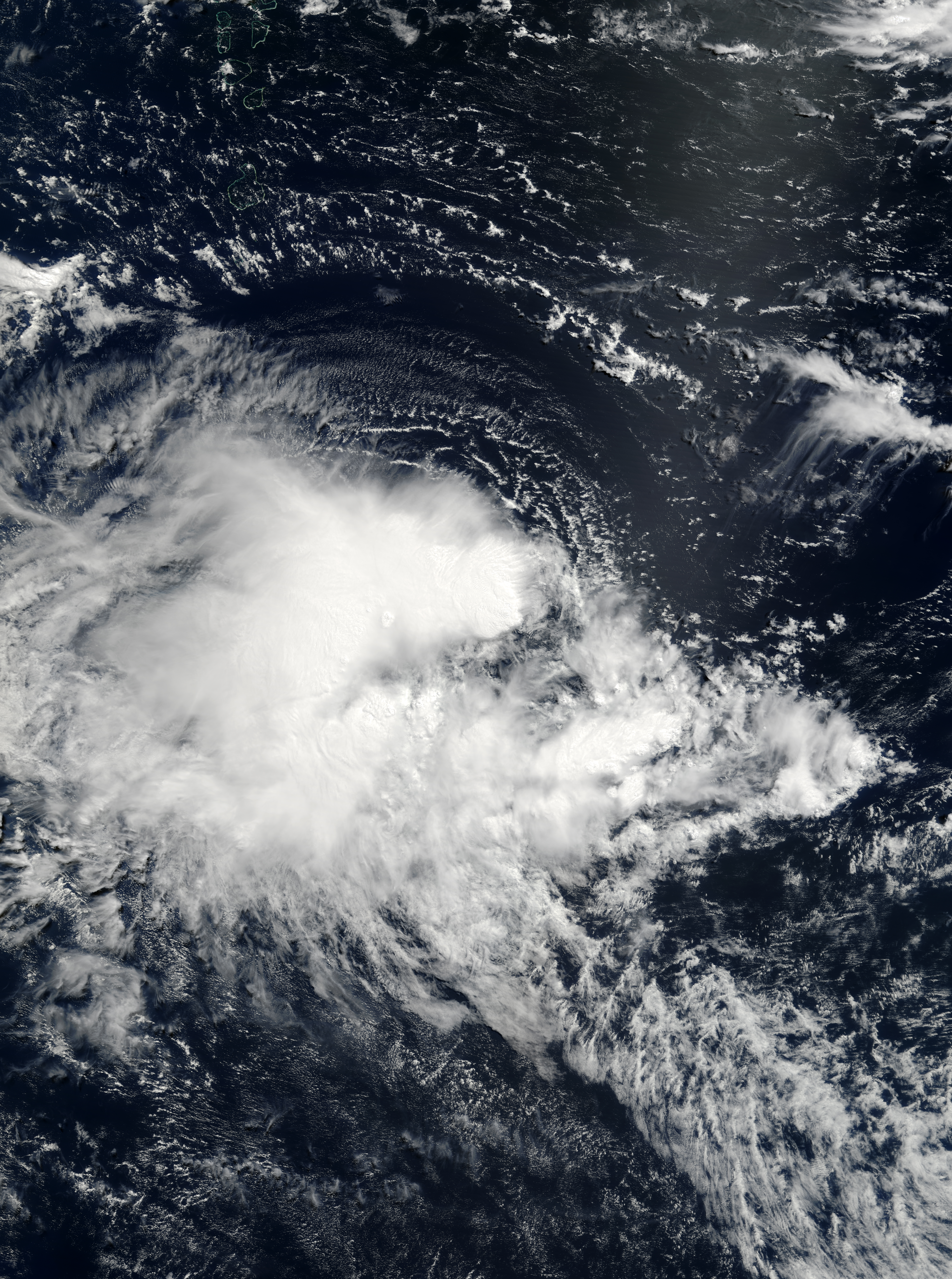
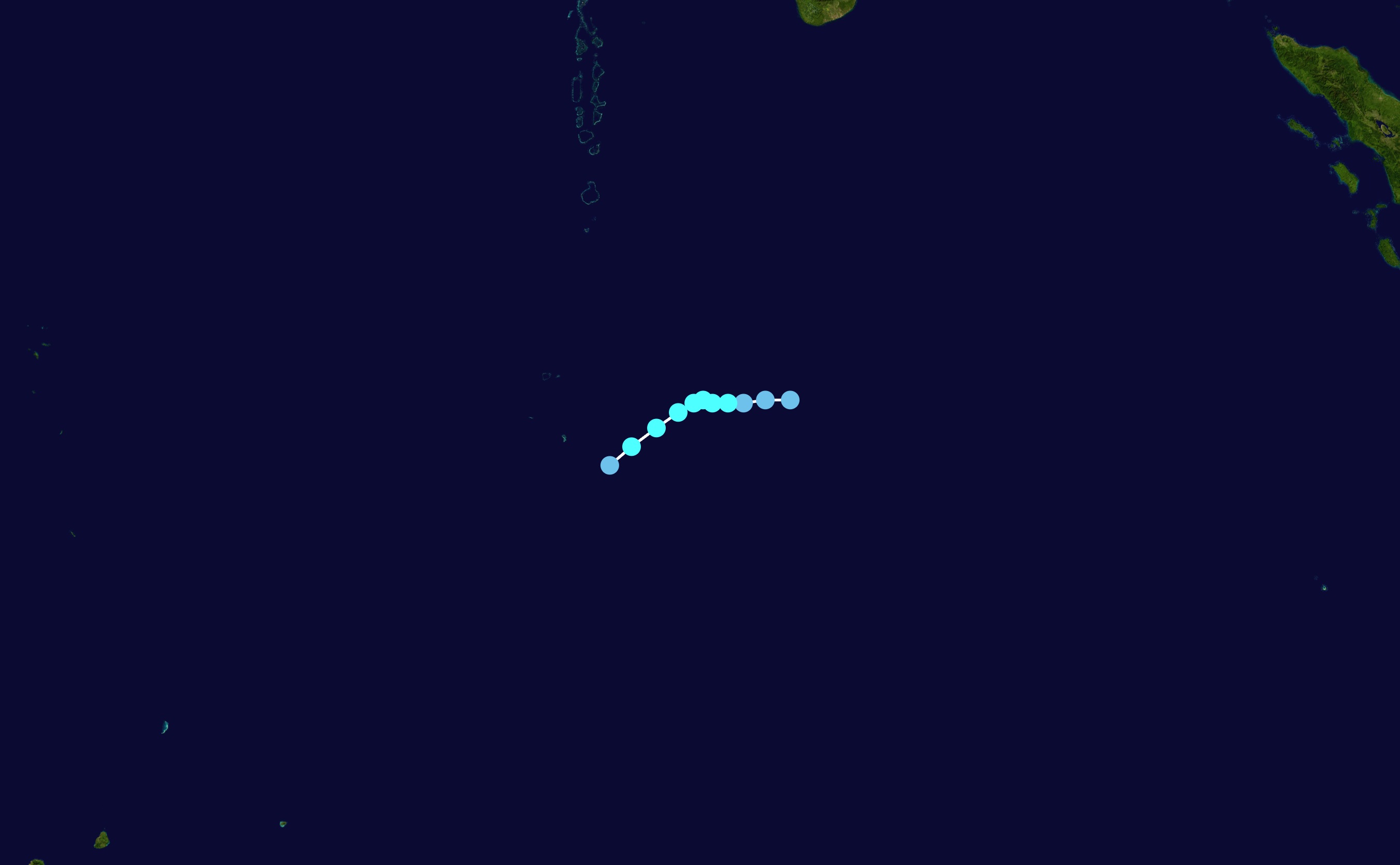
- Duration: August 1 – August 3
- Peak intensity: 55 km/h (35 mph) (10-min); 999 hPa (mbar)

On August 1, in the middle of the southern hemisphere's winter, an area of convection persisted in the northeastern portion of the basin about 740 km (460 mi) northeast of Diego Garcia. At that time, an associated circulation was exposed to the east of the thunderstorms. At 06:00 UTC that day, the MFR initiated advisories on Tropical Disturbance 1. After the system organized further, the JTWC also began tracking the system as Tropical Cyclone 01S, estimating winds of 65 km/h (40 mph). With a ridge to the south, the system tracked generally westward, briefly becoming a tropical depression on August 1. An approaching trough weakened the ridge, allowing the depression to turn southwestward. Located in an area of moderate wind shear, the system failed to intensify further, and it dissipated on August 3.

=== Tropical Depression 02 ===
- Tropical depression (MFR)
- Tropical storm (SSHWS)
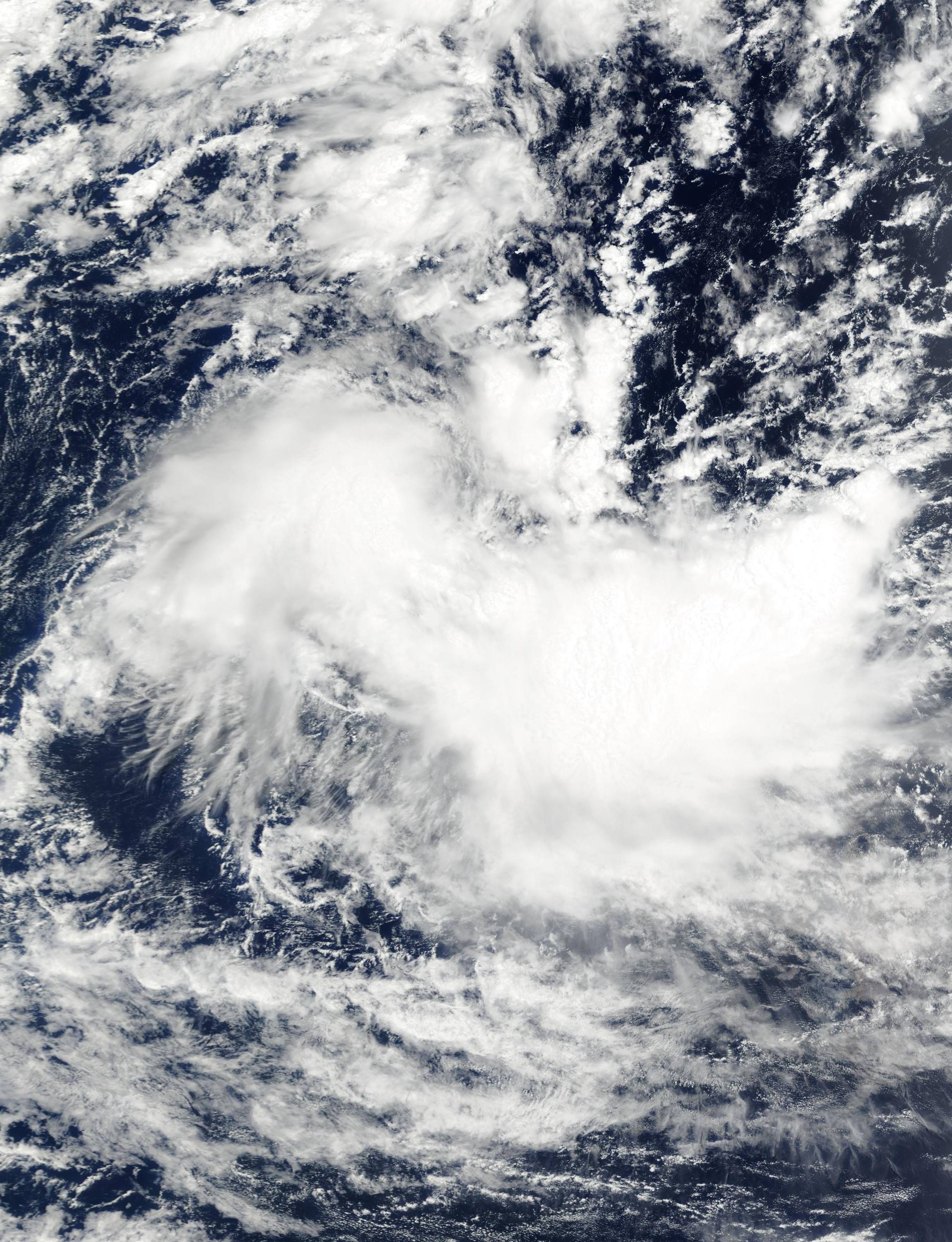
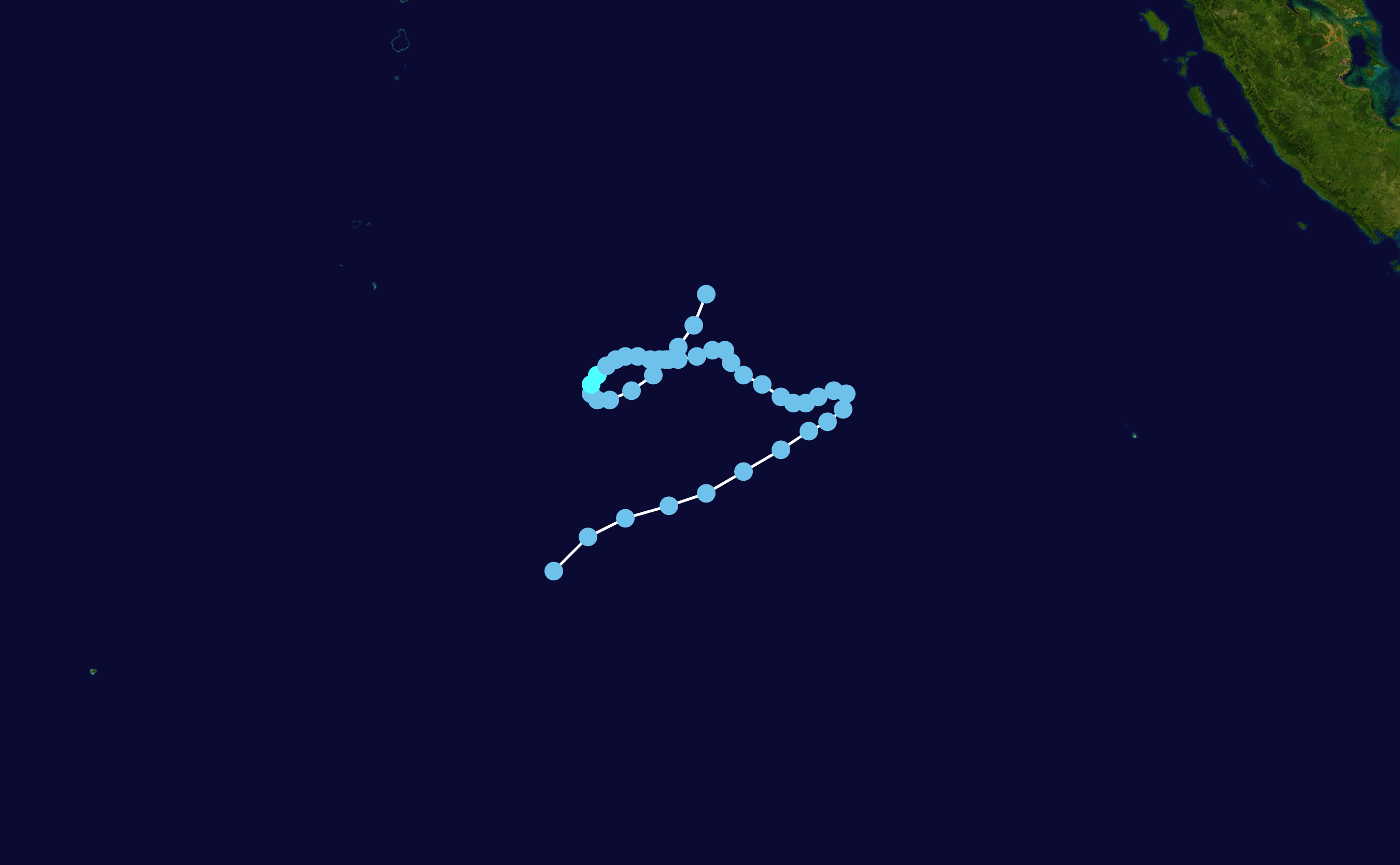
- Duration: November 12 – November 20
- Peak intensity: 55 km/h (35 mph) (10-min); 998 hPa (mbar)

An area of convection formed on November 9 to the east of Diego Garcia, possibly the result of the MJO. A circulation was evident by November 11, and the following day it developed into Tropical Disturbance 2 about 830 km (520 mi) southeast of Diego Garcia. Also on November 12, the JTWC classified the system as Tropical Cyclone 02S. It moved to the southwest, but looped back to the east on November 13, during which time the MFR upgraded it to tropical depression status. Later that day, the agency ceased issuing advisories, but the system reorganized on November 14. On November 17, it turned back to the southwest, but the MFR discontinued advisories on the next day.

=== Intense Tropical Cyclone Ando ===
- Intense tropical cyclone (MFR)
- Category 4 tropical cyclone (SSHWS)
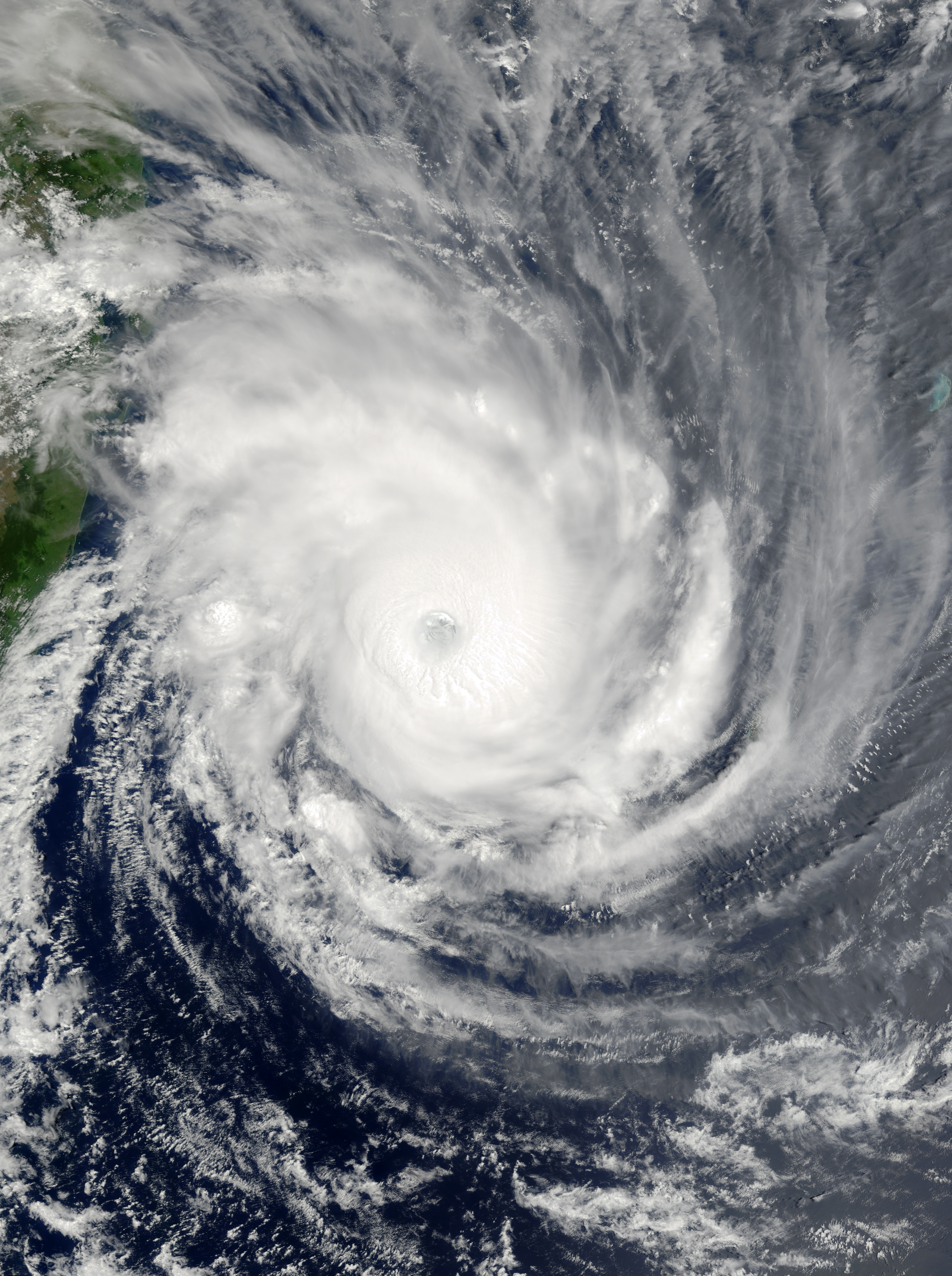
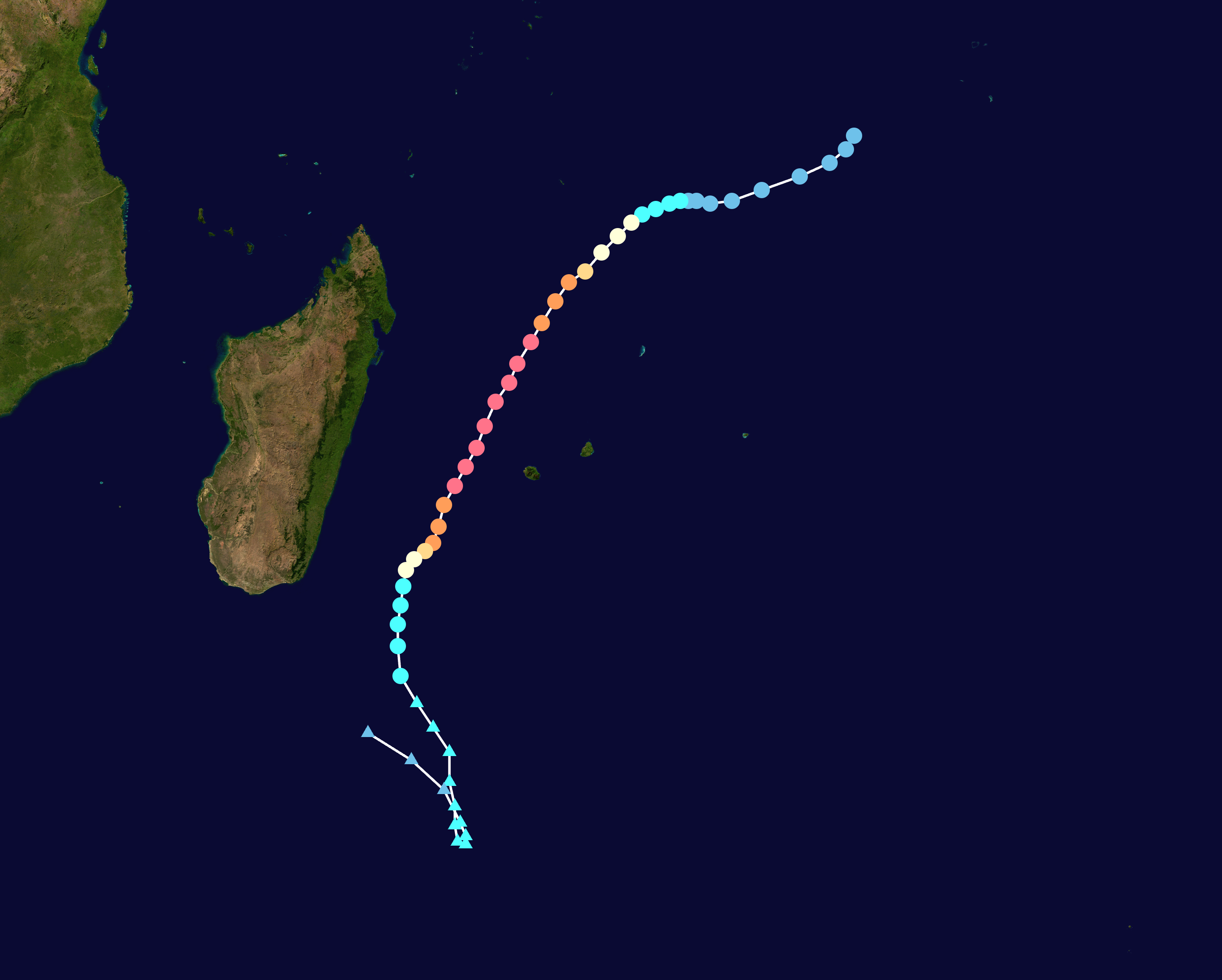
- Duration: December 31 – January 9
- Peak intensity: 195 km/h (120 mph) (10-min); 925 hPa (mbar)

The beginnings of Ando can be traced to a circulation within the Intertropical Convergence Zone (ITCZ) about 400 km (250 mi) south-west of Diego Garcia, which became evident on satellite imagery on December 30. Associated convection, or thunderstorms, gradually organized into a central dense overcast, and the system became Tropical Disturbance 3 at 06:00 UTC on December 31. The upper-level environment generally favored further development, but the system failed to develop more initially due to some easterly wind shear. A large ridge to the south steered the nascent disturbance to the west-southwest. After the shear subsided, the system intensified into a moderate tropical storm on January 2, given the name "Ando" by the Mauritius Meteorological Service. Also on that day, the JTWC began issuing advisories on the storm as Tropical Cyclone 04S, and around that time, Ando was passing about 465 km (289 mi) east-southeast of Agaléga island.

Ando rapidly intensified after forming and attained tropical cyclone status early on January 4, developing an eye in the center of the thunderstorms and outflow to the east. A tropical low over the southern Mozambique Channel weakened the ridge, causing Ando to turn more to the southwest. Late on January 4, the storm intensified further into an intense tropical cyclone, and early the next day passed about 120 km (75 mi) northeast of Tromelin Island. According to the JTWC, however, Ando attained peak 1 minute winds of 220 km/h (135 mph) late on January 5. In contrast, the MFR assessed Ando as weakening due to the becoming larger and less defined, while still maintaining a small cloud diameter of about 400 km (250 mi). However, the eye re-organized, and Ando attained peak 10 minute winds of 195 km/h (120 mph) on January 6, with a 60 km (37 mi) eye at the time. Continuing around the ridge, the cyclone passed about 205 km (127 mi) west of Réunion that day before starting to weaken due to increased wind shear. On January 8, Ando weakened below tropical cyclone status, and the convection increasingly separated from the circulation while turning to the southeast. On January 10, the storm became extratropical, although the remnants turned back to the northwest due to the ridge, dissipating on January 13.

As a developing storm, Ando produced some heavy rain between December 30 and January 2 over Seychelles. Swaziland also reported that Ando drew moisture from the continent, aggravating a persistent dry spell. While near Agaléga island, Ando dropped 108 mm (4.3 in) of rainfall, compared to a January average precipitation there of 150 mm (5.9 in). On Tromelin Island, gusts peaked at 125 km/h (78 mph) and rainfall reached 141 mm (5.6 in). Passing north of Réunion, Ando produced gusts of 70 km/h (45 mph) along the coast, but 133 km/h (83 mph) was recorded at Plaine des Cafres in the mountainous peaks. Most parts of the island did not receive much rain, with the exception of mountainous peaks due to orographic lift, particularly after the center passed to the west. Pas de Bellecombe at an elevation of 2,200 m (7,200 ft) reported 1,255 mm (49.4 in) over 48 hours. The rains caused flooding and some landslides, which washed away one house and killed two people. Ando also damaged crops and killed several livestock. The highest wave recorded was 5.4 m (18 ft) in La Possession. High waves injured several people, several of whom required rescue from lifeguards.

=== Tropical Cyclone Bindu ===
- Tropical cyclone (MFR)
- Category 3 tropical cyclone (SSHWS)
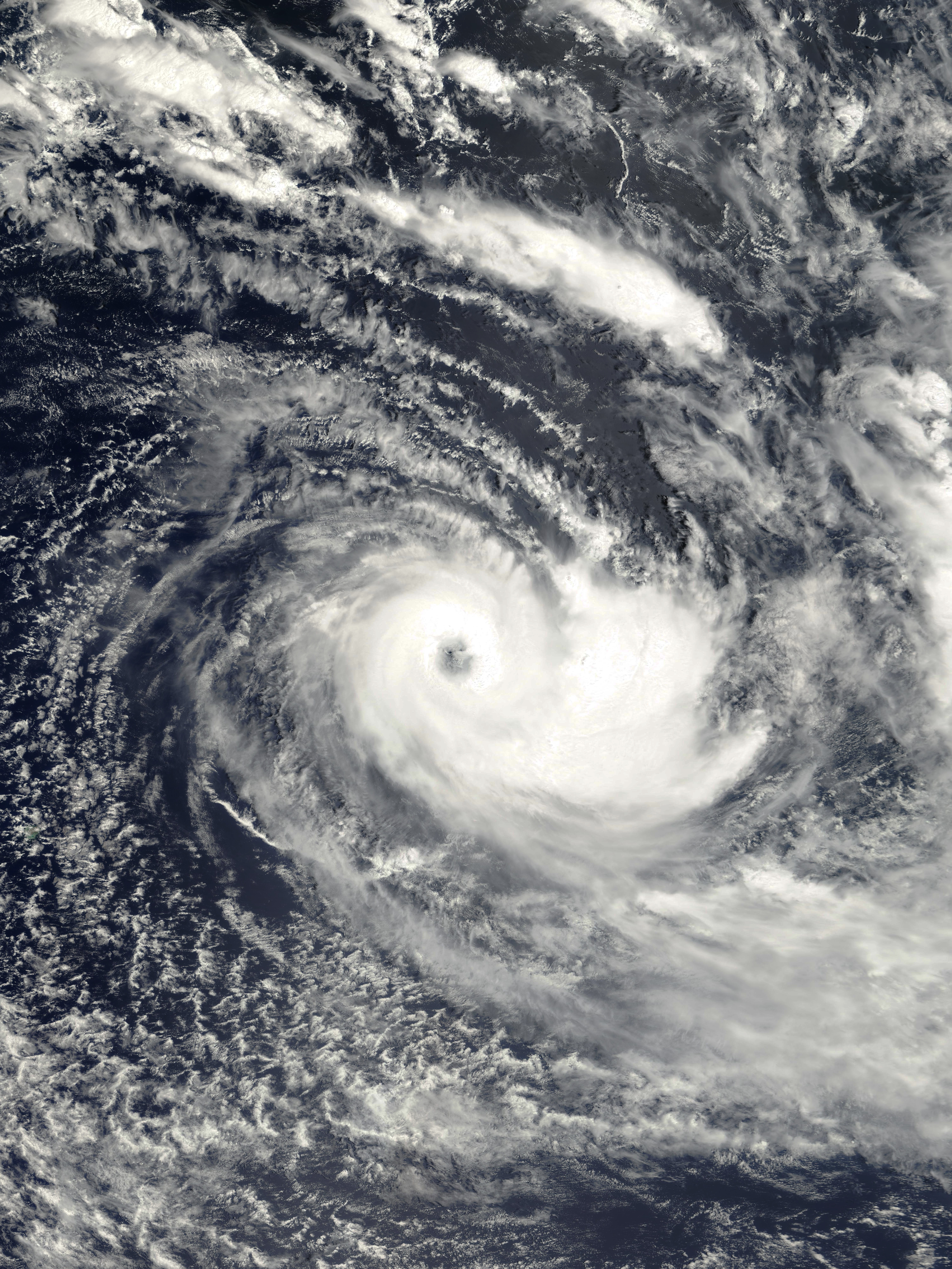
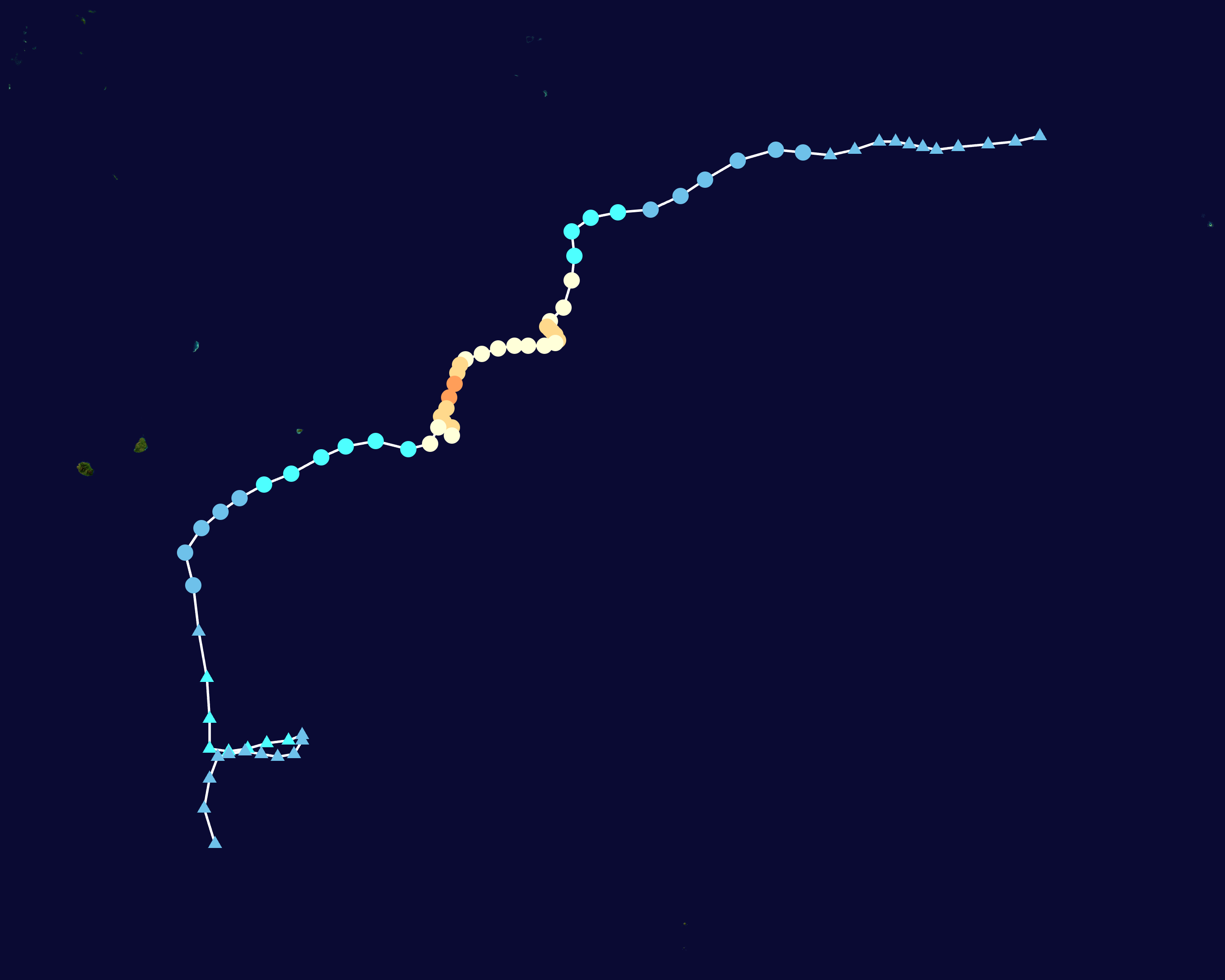
- Duration: January 3 – January 17
- Peak intensity: 150 km/h (90 mph) (10-min); 955 hPa (mbar)

On January 2, an area of convection persisted in the eastern portion of the ITCZ in the Australian basin, located northwest of Cocos Island, or about 1,165 km (724 mi) southwest of Sumatra. With a ridge to the south, the system moved generally westward. A nearby ship confirmed that a circulation formed, and on January 3, it crossed 90°E into the south-west Indian Ocean as a tropical disturbance. With easterly wind shear, the system initially remained weak, but convection increased and organized on January 5. On the next day, the disturbance intensified into a tropical depression, although the circulation was still exposed from the thunderstorms at that time. After turning to the southwest, wind shear decreased, and the depression became Moderate Tropical Storm Bindu on January 7. On the same day, the JTWC also initiated advisories as Tropical Cyclone 05S. Moving around the ridge to the south, Bindu slowly intensified, developing outflow and improved rainbands. Early on January 9, the MFR upgraded the storm to tropical cyclone status as an eye 19 km (12 mi) in diameter formed. The next day, Bindu weakened due to increased wind shear, causing the circulation to be exposed from the convection and for the cyclone to be downgraded into a severe tropical storm.

The building ridge caused the storm to slow and turn back to the west. After the formerly hostile shear relaxed, Bindu became a tropical cyclone again on January 11, redeveloping an eye. On the next day, the MFR estimated peak 10 minute winds of 150 km/h (95 mph), while the JTWC estimated maximum 1 minute winds of 185 km/h (115 mph). By that time, the cyclone had turned back to the south-southwest. Drier air and wind shear resulted in weakening, and Bindu was downgraded to a severe tropical storm on January 14. At 18:00 UTC the next day, the storm passed about 140 km (87 mi) southeast of Rodrigues island, by which time the circulation was exposed north of the dwindling convection. The MFR downgraded Bindu to tropical depression status on January 16. An approaching trough turned the system to the south on the next day, and Bindu became extratropical late on January 17. The remnants turned sharply eastward due to a ridge, later looping back to the west on January 20. Another trough turned the storm southward on January 21 and absorbed the circulation the next day.

=== Intense Tropical Cyclone Charly ===
- Intense tropical cyclone (MFR)
- Category 3 tropical cyclone (SSHWS)
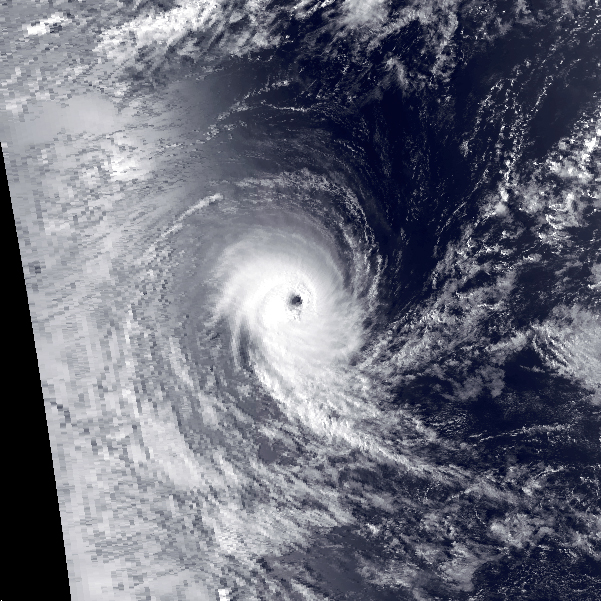
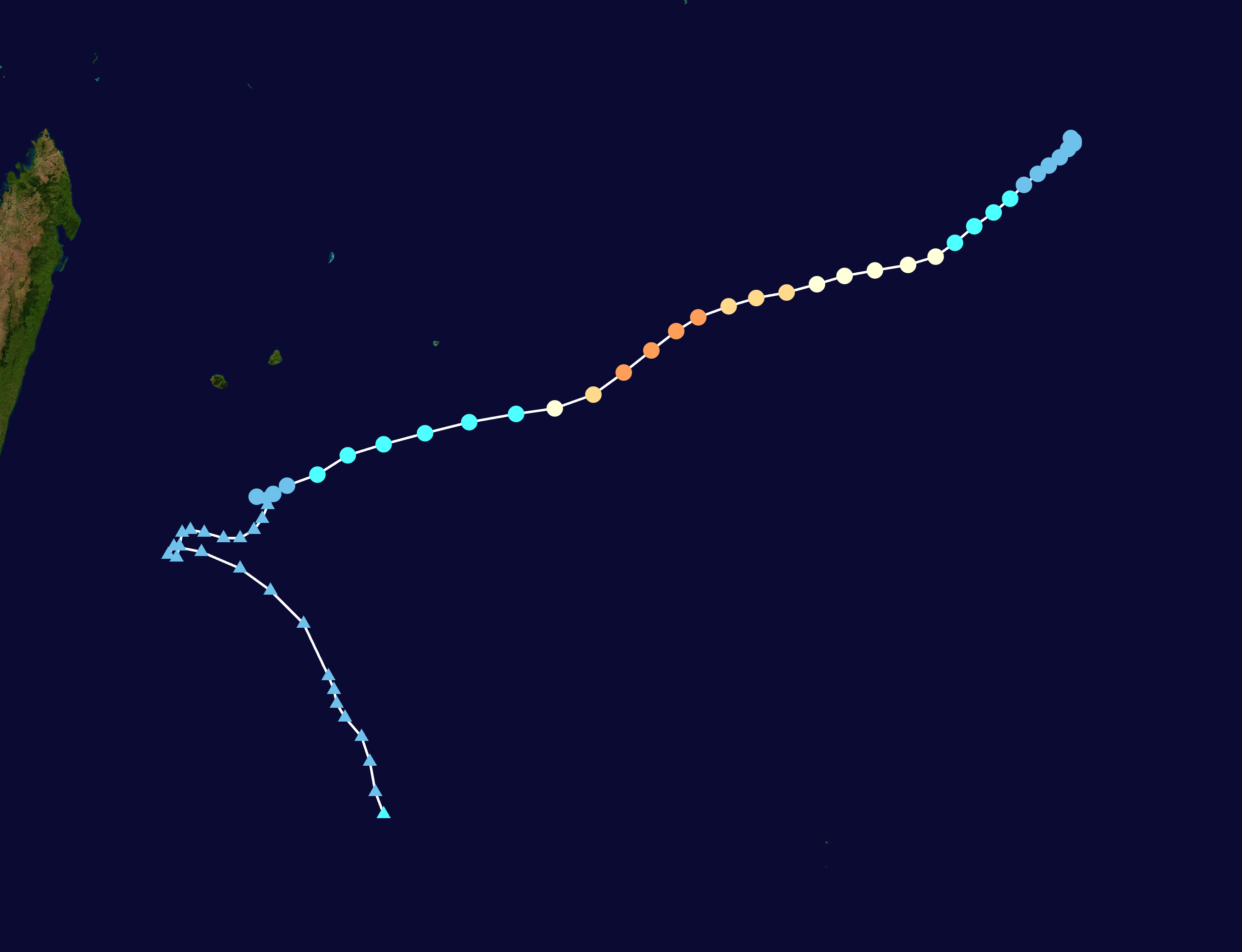
- Duration: January 17 – January 31
- Peak intensity: 185 km/h (115 mph) (10-min); 930 hPa (mbar)

A small circulation formed north of the Cocos Islands on January 8 within the near-equatorial trough. For about a week, it drifted west-southwestward without much development, although an area of convection formed within the system on January 11 about 1,240 km (770 mi) southwest of Sumatra. Persistent wind shear prevented much strengthening, and the circulation crossed into the south-west Indian Ocean on January 16. Another increase in convection merited its classification as a tropical disturbance on the next day, which organized into a central dense overcast. Slow development continued, allowing the disturbance to become a tropical depression and later Tropical Storm Charly on January 19. On the same day, the JTWC also began tracking it as Tropical Cyclone 06S. Taking a track similar to earlier Tropical Cyclone Bindu, the storm moved southwestward around a ridge to the south. Charly gradually developed outflow and increasingly organized convection due to decreasing wind shear. A ragged eye formed on January 20 and became better defined, and early on January 21, Charly intensified into a tropical cyclone.

By January 22, Charly developed a 37 km (23 mi) wide eye, surrounded by deep convection. Based on the increased organization, the storm became an intense tropical cyclone, reaching peak 10 minute winds of 185 km/h (115 mph), according to the MFR. In contrast, the JTWC estimated peak 1 minute winds of 195 km/h (120 mph). Late on January 22, the wind shear and dry air increased while waters became cooler, all of which became detrimental to the storm's structure. The eye rapidly dissipated as the convection dwindled, and within 24 hours of peak intensity, Charly was downgraded to tropical storm status. On January 24, the storm passed about 320 km (200 mi) southeast of Rodrigues. By that time, the circulation was exposed from the thunderstorms, and Charly weakened to tropical depression status on January 25. Caught in the weak low-level flow, the circulation moved erratically, first to the west, then drifting before turning to the southeast. It continued to produce some convection during this time, which spread rainfall over Mauritius and Réunion. A cold front swept Charly to the southeast, absorbing it on January 31.

=== Tropical Depression 07 ===
- Tropical depression (MFR)
- Duration: January 30 – February 3
- Peak intensity: 55 km/h (35 mph) (10-min); 996 hPa (mbar)

Toward the end of January, a broad low persisted south of the Chagos archipelago, becoming a tropical disturbance on January 30 about 650 km (400 mi) south of Diego Garcia. The convection gradually organized as the system moved to the south-southwest, steered by a break in the ridge to the south caused by the remnants of Cyclone Charly. Initially the circulation was very broad, and due to its involvement with the monsoon, it resembled a monsoon depression. Early on February 1, the disturbance intensified into a tropical depression while turning more to the south. Around that time, it passed about 500 km (310 mi) east of Rodrigues. The system became extratropical on February 3, after increased wind shear weakened the convection. The former depression intensified as an extratropical storm, attaining gale-force winds while accelerating its forward motion due to an approaching trough. The system was no longer tracked after February 6 as it approached the polar latitudes.

=== Tropical Cyclone Dera ===
- Tropical cyclone (MFR)
- Category 2 tropical cyclone (SSHWS)
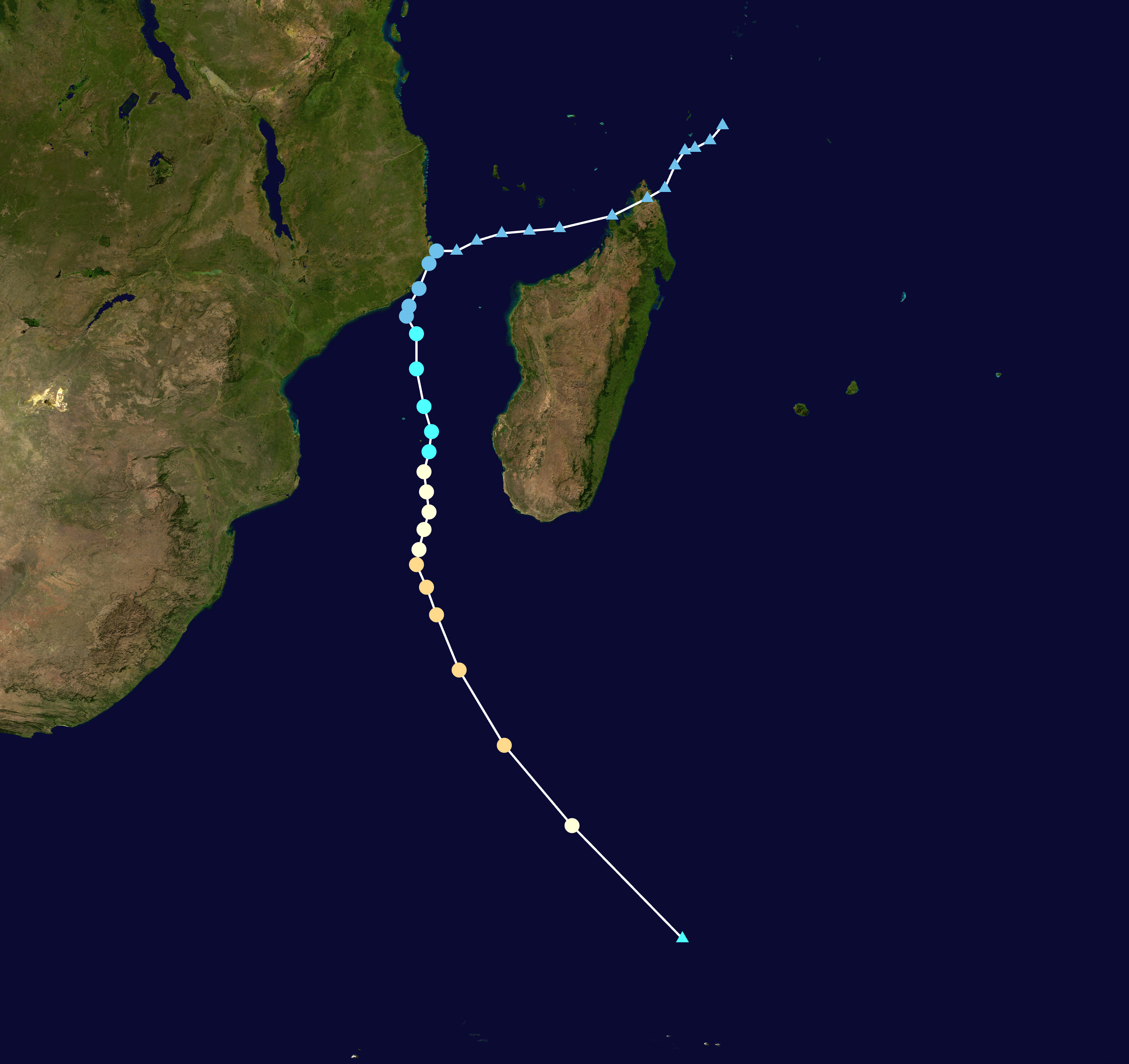
- Duration: March 4 – March 12
- Peak intensity: 150 km/h (90 mph) (10-min); 955 hPa (mbar)

After an extended period of inactivity lasting nearly a month, the ITCZ produced an area of convection on March 1 between Diego Garcia and the Seychelles. There were initially two weak circulations, although the one south-southwest of Diego Garcia ultimately became Cyclone Dera. It moved southwestward without much development at first due to hostile wind shear, with the circulation often exposed from the thunderstorms. On March 4, the system developed into a tropical disturbance off the northeast coast of Madagascar. Two days later, the storm moved ashore Madagascar about 50 km (31 mi) southeast of Antsiranana. It weakened and became indistinct over land, emerging into the Mozambique Channel near Nosy Be as a weak low. Convection gradually increased across the region as the track shifted westward. After moving toward Mozambique, the system rounded the ridge and turned to the south just off the coast, passing only 10 km (6.2 mi) east of Angoche. Around that time, the thunderstorms began organizing more, allowing the disturbance to intensify into a tropical depression on March 8. With warm waters and an anticyclone providing outflow, the depression quickly intensified, becoming Tropical Storm Dera on March 9 and soon after developing an eye feature. Also on that day, the JTWC initiated advisories on the system as Tropical Cyclone 15S.

Late on March 9, Dera passed about 20 km (12 mi) east of Europa Island, although the large eye passed over the island. On March 10, Dera attained tropical cyclone status, and after a brief bout of wind shear, the eye became better defined. The cyclone attained peak 10 minute winds of 150 km/h (95 mph) on March 11, according to the MFR, and 1 minute winds of 165 km/h (105 mph) according to the JTWC. Despite being located unusually far to the south, Dera maintained its intensity due to warm waters, and it accelerated southeastward due to an approaching cold front. Wind shear increased on March 12, and only on that day did water temperatures drop off, causing a marked decrease in intensity and for the eye to dissipate. Late on March 12, Dera became extratropical, which continued southeastward along the cold front.

The precursor of Dera dropped heavy rainfall in Mayotte, reaching 193 mm (7.6 in) on Pamanzi. The precipitation came in intense squalls, with hourly peaks of 49 mm (1.9 in) recorded, which flooded rivers and some houses. In addition, the system produced gusts of 101 km/h (63 mph), strong enough to damage roofs, cause power outages, and damage fields and trees. Heavy rainfall also spread across Mozambique, producing additional river flooding Zambezi in a region that had been flooded for weeks. The floods wrecked dozens of homes and covered many roads, while killing two people. Later, gusts peaked at 155 km/h (96 mph) on Europa Island, while rainfall reached 72 mm (2.8 in).

=== Severe Tropical Storm Evariste ===
- Severe tropical storm (MFR)
- Category 1 tropical cyclone (SSHWS)
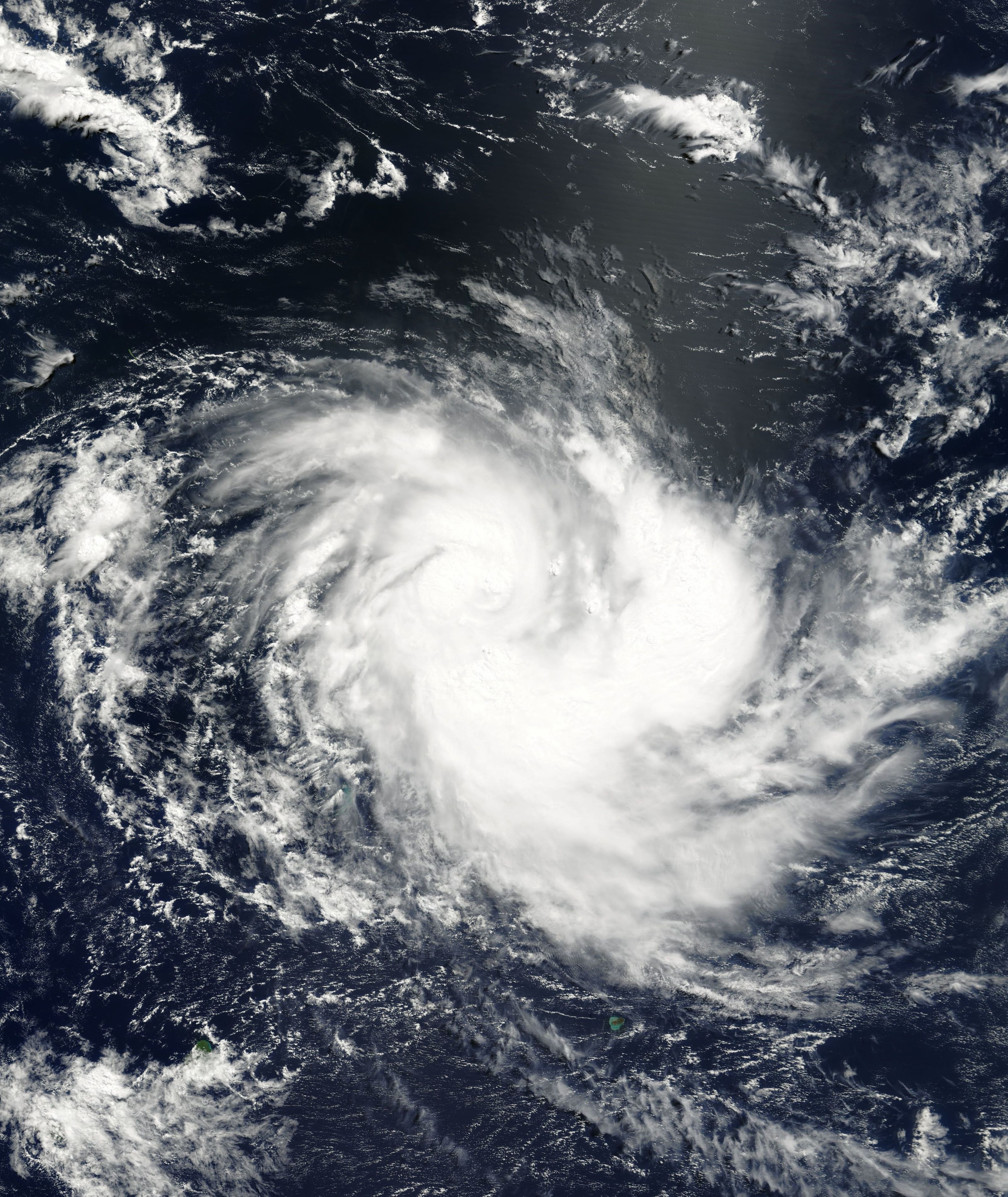
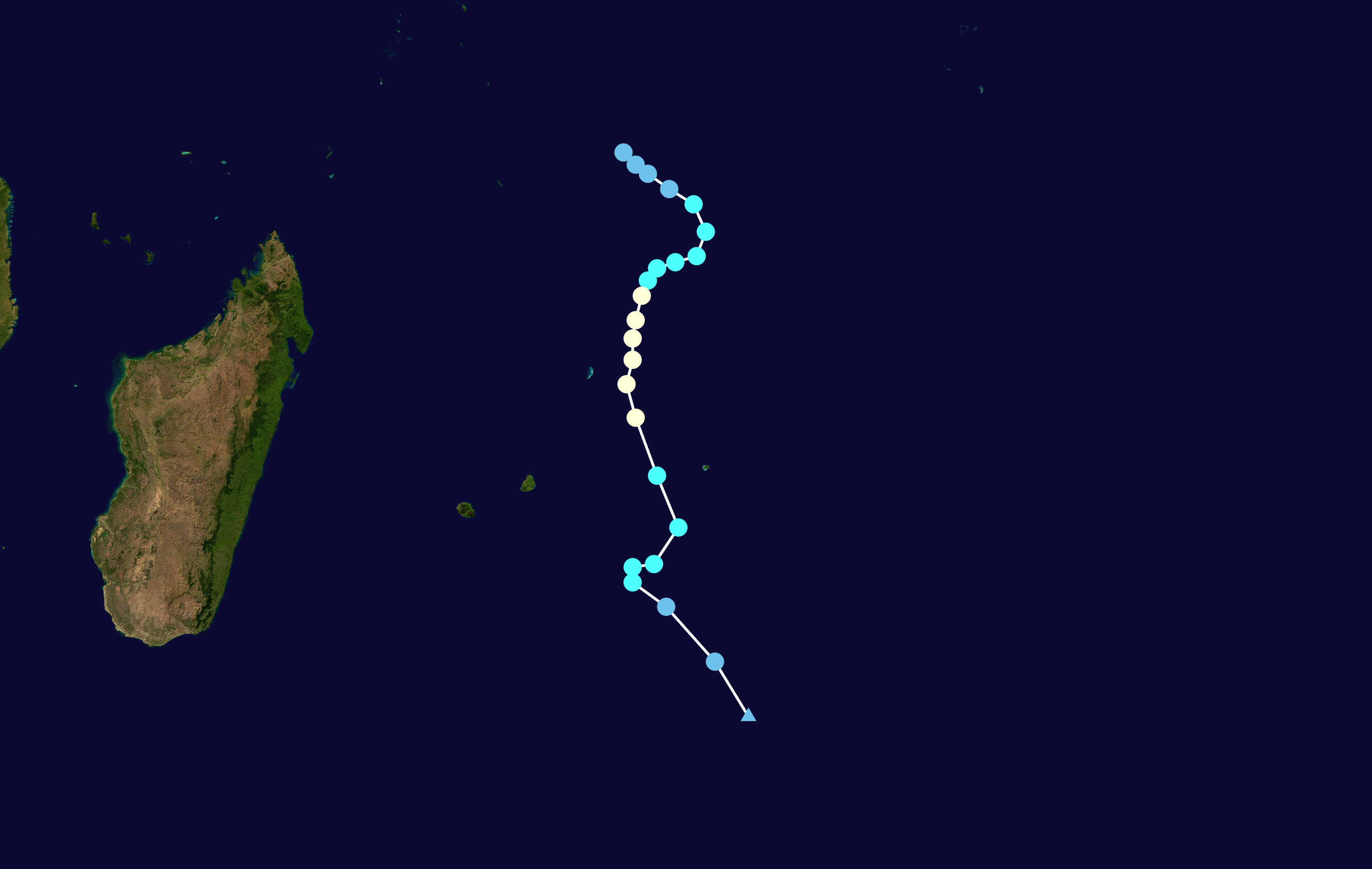
- Duration: April 2 – April 8
- Peak intensity: 110 km/h (70 mph) (10-min); 973 hPa (mbar)

The ITCZ became active in late March, spawning several areas of convection across the Indian Ocean and into the adjacent Australian basin. The westernmost system had a circulation as of March 31 about 600 km (370 mi) west-southwest of Diego Garcia. Despite favorable conditions, the system failed to organize at first, although it became Tropical Disturbance 9 on April 2 after the structure improved. Drifting to the southwest and later to the south, the associated convection waxed and waned, finally organizing more on April 4; on that day, the disturbance quickly intensified into Moderate Tropical Storm Evariste. A day prior, the JTWC had initiated advisories on the system as Tropical Cyclone 18S. A trough to the south weakened the ridge, turning the storm to the southwest. A small eye formed on April 5, but later dissipated after an increase in thunderstorm activity. On that day, the MFR estimated peak 10 minute winds of 110 km/h (70 mph), just shy of tropical cyclone status, while the JTWC estimated 1 minute winds of 140 km/h (85 mph). On April 6, increased wind shear from the approaching trough began weakening Evariste and turned it to the south. That day, it passed about 135 km (84 mi) east of St. Brandon, and on April 7, Evariste bypassed Rodrigues about 200 km (120 mi) to the southwest. The convection gradually deteriorated and left the circulation exposed. Late on April 7, the storm suddenly turned southwestward toward a developing low east of Madagascar, although the southwest motion resumed soon after. On April 8, Evariste dissipated, dissipating ahead of the nearby trough.

Evariste produced peak gusts of 91 km/h (57 mph) on St. Brandon, with 23 mm (0.91 in) of rainfall recorded. Stronger winds were recorded on Rodrigues while the storm passed, reaching 109 km/h (68 mph). Rainfall was minimal, reaching only 15 mm (0.59 in), and failing to alleviate drought conditions.

=== Moderate Tropical Storm 10 ===
- Moderate tropical storm (MFR)
- Tropical storm (SSHWS)
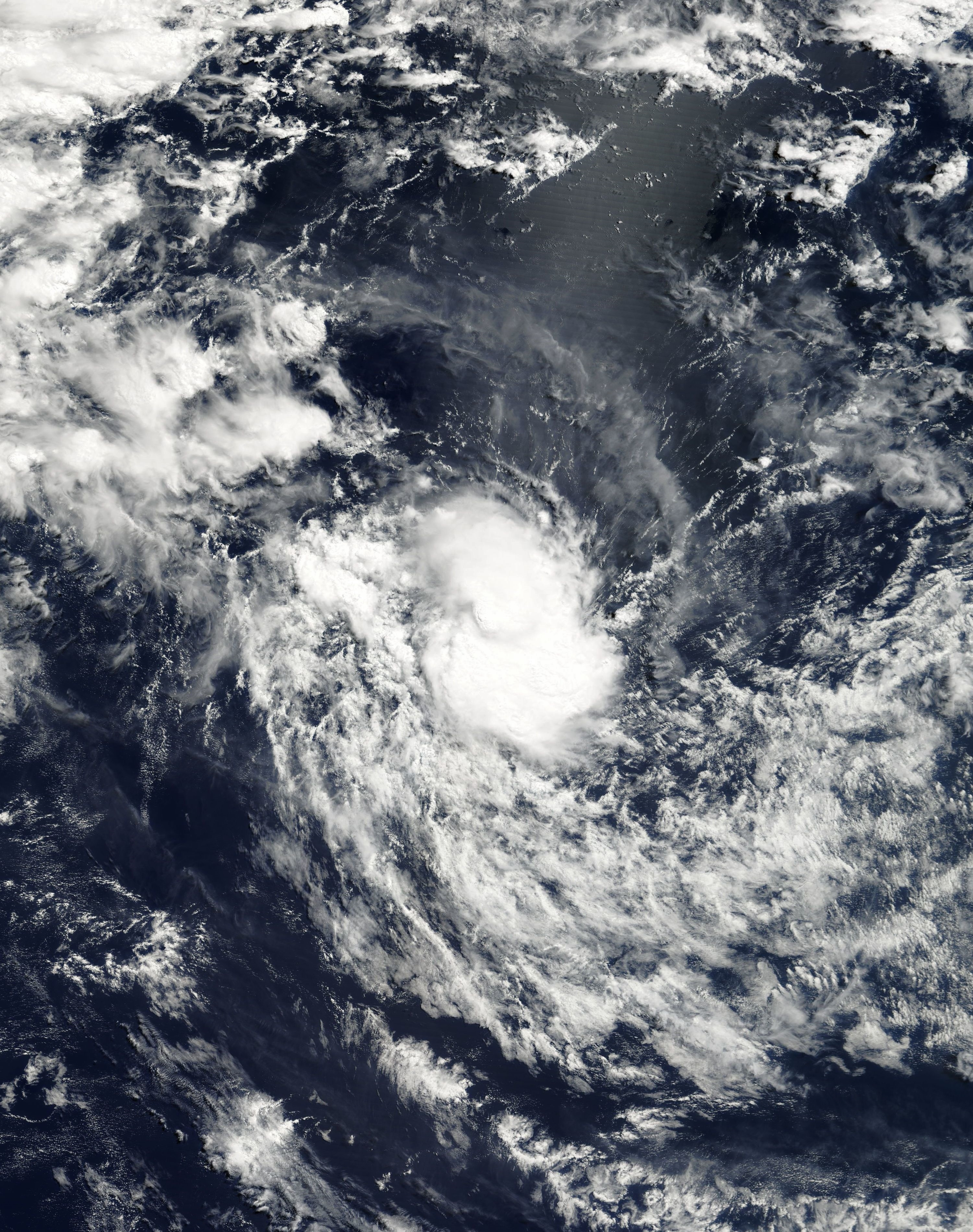
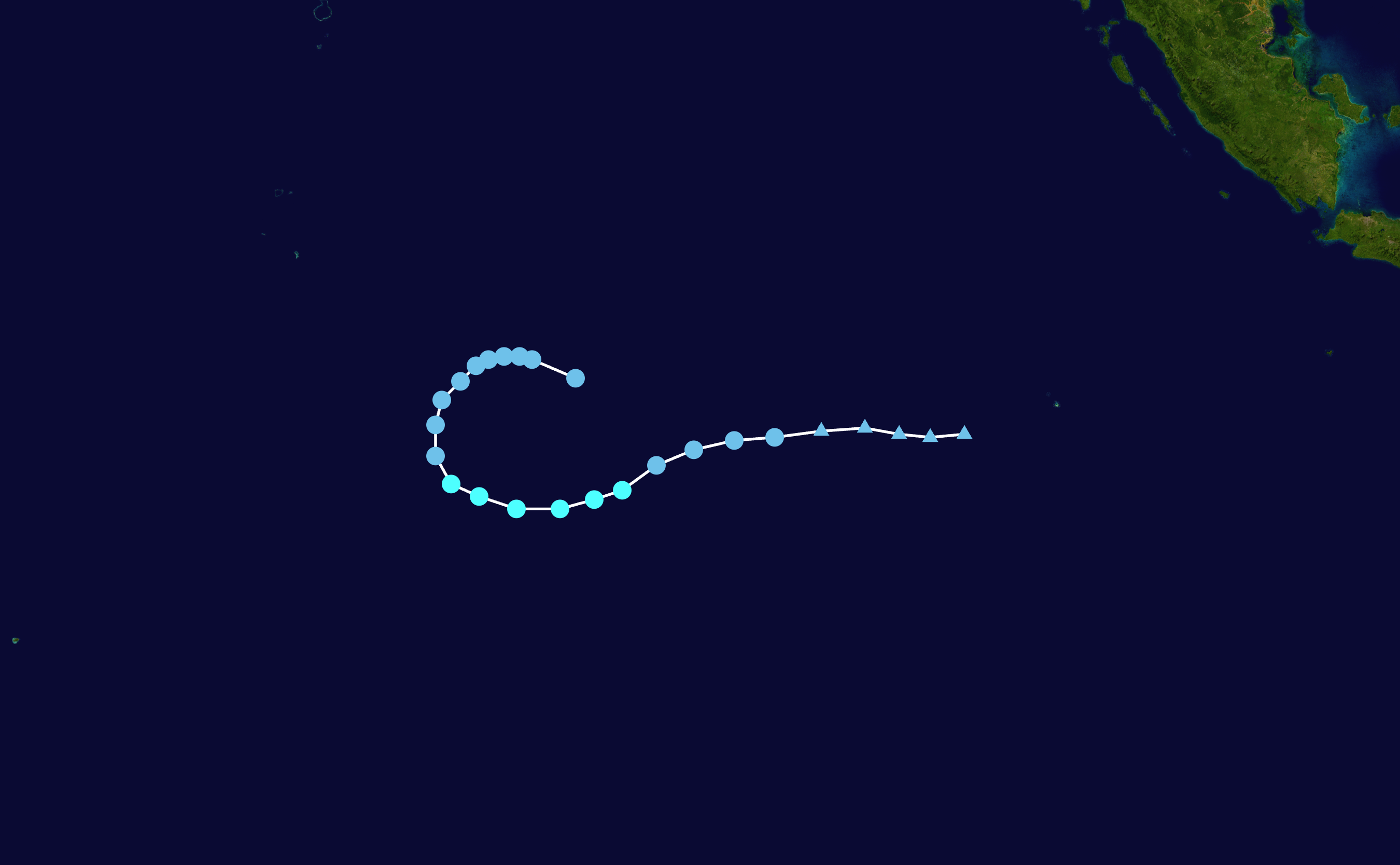
- Duration: April 2 (entered basin) – April 5
- Peak intensity: 65 km/h (40 mph) (10-min); 998 hPa (mbar)

A small area of convection not associated from the ITCZ became Tropical Disturbance 10 on April 1, about 215 km (134 mi) west-northwest of the Cocos Islands in the Australian region. It moved west-southwestward, entering the south-west Indian Ocean on April 2, and on the same date the JTWC classified it as Tropical Cyclone 16S. The thunderstorms organized into a small central dense overcast, and there was evidence of an eye feature, suggesting the system could have been much stronger. Although satellite imagery had difficulty in tracking the low-level circulation, a nearby ship on April 3 confirmed the presence of a circulation. Operationally the system was only classified as a tropical depression. However, data from QuikSCAT helped upgrade the system to moderate tropical storm status in a post-season analysis, with peak winds of 65 km/h (40 mph) on April 3; as a result, it was not named. After previously moving to the west-southwest, the small storm turned back to the west due to a strengthening ridge to the south. Wind shear increased on April 4, which rapidly dwindled the convection and thereby leaving behind an exposed circulation. It underwent the Fujiwhara effect with a larger disturbance to the east, causing the system to turn back to the north and dissipate on April 5.

=== Subtropical Depression 11 ===
- Subtropical depression (MFR)
- Category 1 tropical cyclone (SSHWS)
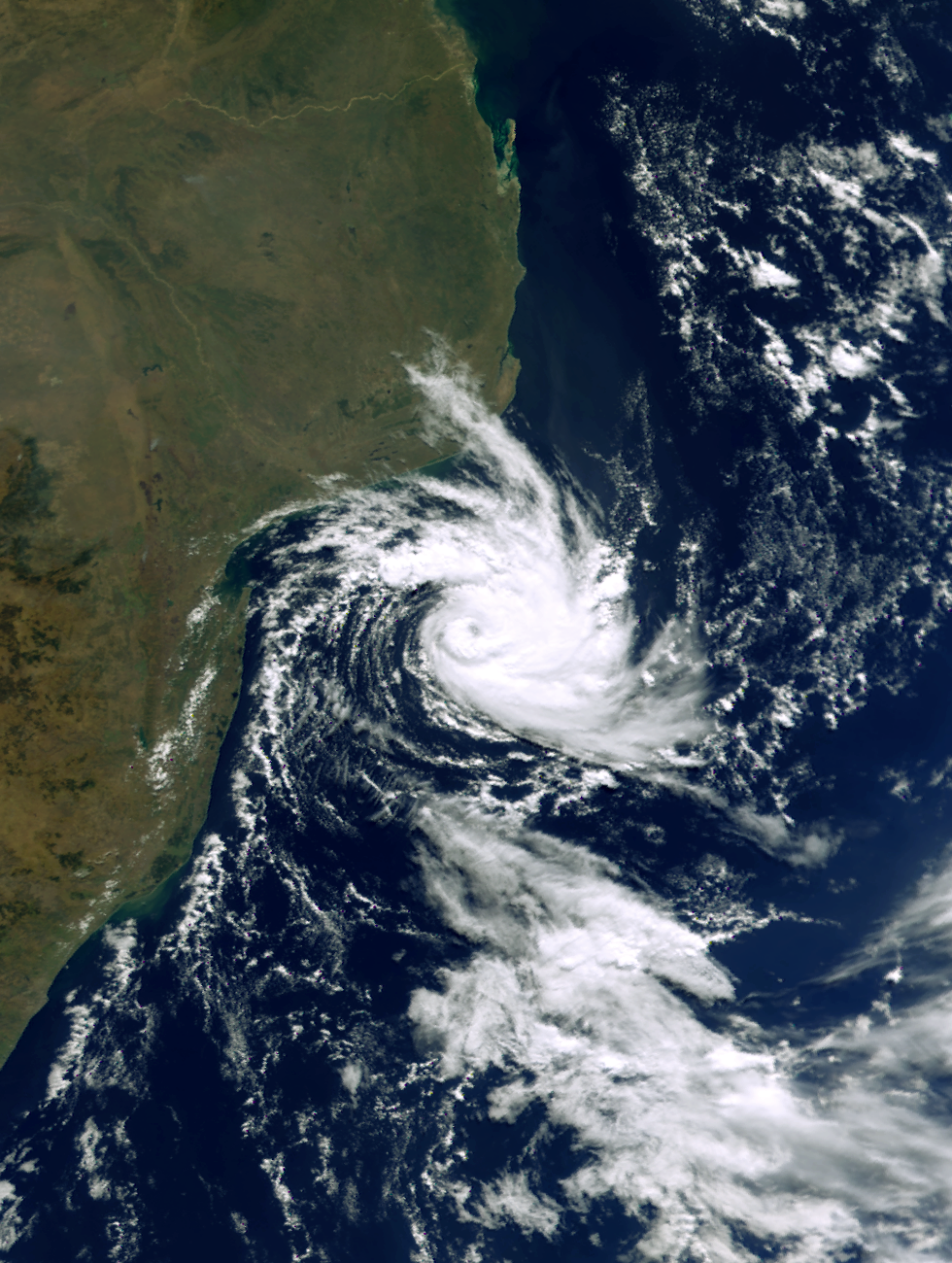
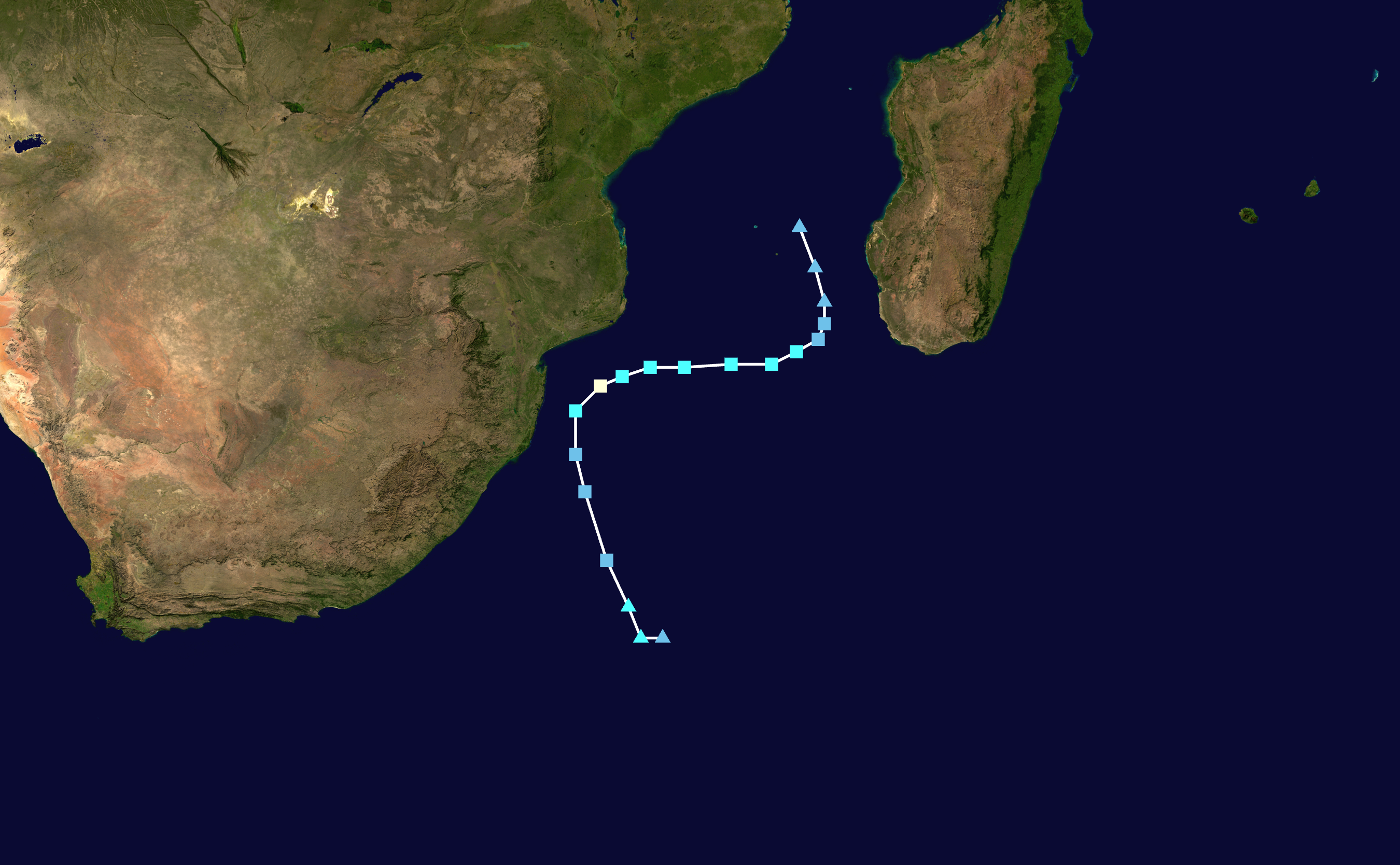
- Duration: June 20 – June 24
- Peak intensity: 95 km/h (60 mph) (10-min); 995 hPa (mbar)

Similar to Subtropical Depression 13 in April 2000, there was an unusual subtropical cyclone that formed in June at the end of the season. A trough exited South Africa on June 18 with an associated frontal wave in the southern Mozambique Channel. On the next day, the system separated from the front and became a cut-off low. It moved north-northwestward along the eastern periphery of a ridge in southern Africa, becoming a subtropical depression on June 20. The associated convection initially diminished, although the thunderstorms redeveloped due to the atmospheric instability in the region. On June 21, the depression passed about 100 km (62 mi) east of Maputo, Mozambique, while moving into an area of much warmer waters. As such, the structure became more tropical, with a small central dense overcast forming over the circulation only 75 km (47 mi) in diameter. The JTWC initiated advisories on June 21 as Tropical Cyclone 21S. The small size of the storm merited the MFR calling it a "midget cyclone", with a small eye forming late on June 21. Based on the feature, the JTWC estimated peak 1 winds of 120 km/h (75 mph); in contrast, the MFR estimated 10 minute winds of 95 km/h (60 mph). Despite the structure, the convection was shallow, which brought uncertainty to the true intensity of the storm. Turning to the northeast and east, the subtropical storm rapidly weakened on June 22 to depression status after the environment became hostile, and the convection largely dissipated. The exposed low turned northwestward on June 23, dissipating the next day.

The storm was the only one on record to form in the Mozambique Channel in June. In addition, it was the strongest storm to form so late in the season.

=== Other systems ===
An area of convection persisted on January 19 off the east coast of Madagascar, which became Tropical Disturbance 6 two days later. It drifted to the east, strengthening to tropical depression status on January 22, and passing 330 km (210 mi) west of Réunion. Increased wind shear caused the system to weaken as it turned back to the west, dissipating over Madagascar on January 24. On Réunion, the system dropped about 100 mm (3.9 in) of rainfall, including a total of 50 mm (2.0 in) falling in a 90-minute period in Cape Bernard.

On January 23, a weak tropical low began affecting Mozambique for two days, causing flooding that killed six people. Although newspaper sources indicated that the system was a tropical storm, it remained unclassified by MFR.

On April 17, a weak low exited from the coast of South Africa and moved southeastward over the warm waters of the southern Mozambique Channel. By April 19, it had organized into a subtropical depression and produced gale-force winds. The MFR did not classify the system, however, due to it being located from 33 to 35° S, which was outside of the agency's area of warning responsibility at the time.

== Storm names ==
A tropical disturbance is named when it reaches moderate tropical storm strength. If a tropical disturbance reaches moderate tropical storm status west of 55°E, then the Sub-regional Tropical Cyclone Advisory Centre in Madagascar assigns the appropriate name to the storm. If a tropical disturbance reaches moderate tropical storm status between 55°E and 90°E, then the Sub-regional Tropical Cyclone Advisory Centre in Mauritius assigns the appropriate name to the storm. A new annual list is used every year so no names are retired.

This was the first season in the basin to feature a list of names comprising a mix of male and female names, in addition to covering the whole basic Latin alphabet from A to Z (prior lists skipped letters Q, U, X, and Z, although the 1983–84 list included a name beginning with Z).

- Ando
- Bindu
- Charly
- Dera
- Evariste
- Francois (unused)
- Gaby (unused)
- Hans (unused)
- Idriss (unused)
- Jakoba (unused)
- Kiran (unused)
- Lanto (unused)
- Mathieu (unused)
- Nancy (unused)
- Oda (unused)
- Premnath (unused)
- Quirin (unused)
- Rakoto (unused)
- Suzy (unused)
- Tovo (unused)
- Ursula (unused)
- Vimla (unused)
- Wenda (unused)
- Xino (unused)
- Yul (unused)
- Zoe (unused)

== Season effects ==
This table lists all of the tropical cyclones and subtropical cyclones that were monitored during the 2010–2011 South-West Indian Ocean cyclone season. Information on their intensity, duration, name, areas affected, primarily comes from RSMC La Réunion. Death and damage reports come from either press reports or the relevant national disaster management agency while the damage totals are given in 2010 or 2011 USD.

Name	Dates	Peak intensity			Areas affected	Damage (USD)	Deaths	Ref(s).
Name	Dates	Category	Wind speed	Pressure	Areas affected	Damage (USD)	Deaths	Ref(s).
One/01S	August 1 — 3, 2000	Tropical depression	55 km/h (35 mph)	999 hPa (29.50 inHg)	None	None	None	
Ando	December 31 – January 9	Intense Tropical Cyclone	195 km/h (120 mph)	925 hPa (27.32 inHg)	Seychelles, Agaléga, Tromelin, Mauritius, Réunion	Unknown	2	
Bindu	January 3 – 17	Tropical cyclone	150 km/h (95 mph)	955 hPa (28.20 inHg)	Rodrigues	None	None	
Charly	January 17 – 31	Intense Tropical Cyclone	185 km/h (115 mph)	930 hPa (27.46 inHg)	Rodrigues, Mauritius, Réunion	None	None	
Dera	March 4 – 12	Tropical cyclone	150 km/h (95 mph)	955 hPa (28.20 inHg)	Comoros, Mayotte, Madagascar, Europa	Unknown	2	
Evariste	April 2 – 5	Severe Tropical Storm	110 km/h (70 mph)	973 hPa (28.73 inHg)	Rodrigues	None	None	
Ten/16S	April 2 – 5	Moderate Tropical Storm	65 km/h (40 mph)	998 hPa (29.47 inHg)	None	None	None	
Eleven/21S	June 19 — 24, 2001	Subtropical depression	75 km/h (45 mph)	1000 hPa (29.53 inHg)	None	None	None	
Season aggregates
7 systems	December 31 – June 24		195 km/h (120 mph)	925 hPa (27.32 inHg)		Unknown	4	

== Contemporaneous seasons ==
- List of Southern Hemisphere tropical cyclone seasons
- Atlantic hurricane seasons: 2000, 2001
- Pacific hurricane seasons: 2000, 2001
- Pacific typhoon seasons: 2000, 2001
- North Indian Ocean cyclone seasons: 2000, 2001
