= Montagnes =

Montagnes may refer to:

== France ==
Communes:

- Ferrals-les-Montagnes, in the Hérault Department
- Riom-ès-Montagnes, in the Cantal Department
- Saint-Affrique-les-Montagnes, in the Tarn Department
- Viviers-lès-Montagnes, in the Tarn Department

== Ivory Coast ==
- Montagnes District, a first-level administrative subdivision
- Dix-Huit Montagnes Region, a defunct first-level administrative subdivision

== See also ==
- Montagne (disambiguation)
- La Montagne (disambiguation)
