= Montagne =

Montagne or Montagné may refer to:

== People ==
- Camille Montagne (1784–1866), French military physician and botanist. The standard author abbreviation Mont. (of Montagne) is used to indicate this individual as the author when citing a botanical name.
- Chiel Montagne (1944–2025), Dutch radio and television presenter
- Edward Montagne (1912-2003), American film and television director
- Joachim Havard de la Montagne (1927–2003), French composer and organist
- Gilbert Montagné (born 1957), French musician
- Michel de Montaigne (1533-1592), French philosopher
- Pierre de La Montagne (1755–1825), French playwright and poet
- Prosper Montagné (1865-1948), French chef and author
- Renée Montagne (born 1948), American radio journalist

== Places ==
- Montagne, Gironde, a commune in the Gironde department, France
- Montagne, Isère, a commune in the Isère department, France
- Montagne, Trentino, a commune in Trentino, Italy
- Montagne Center, a basketball arena in Beaumont, Texas for Lamar University

== See also ==
- La Montagne (newspaper), French regional newspaper
- La Montagne (disambiguation)
- Montagnes (disambiguation)
- Montaigne (disambiguation)
