= William T. Martin =

American lawyer, politician and Confederate general of the Civil War (1823–1910)

William Thompson Martin
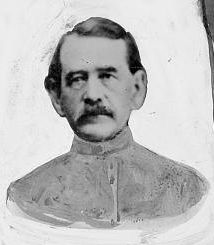
- Born: March 25, 1823; Glasgow, Kentucky
- Died: March 16, 1910 (aged 86); Natchez, Mississippi
- Military career
- Allegiance: Confederate States of America
- Branch: Confederate States Army
- Rank: Major General (CSA)
- Commands: Jeff. Davis Legion; Martin's Cavalry Division; Cavalry Corps, Longstreet's Command
- Conflicts: American Civil War
- Other work: lawyer, politician, railroad president

William Thompson Martin (March 25, 1823 – March 16, 1910) was an American lawyer and politician who became a Confederate States Army major general during the American Civil War. He later served in the Mississippi state senate, and was a delegate to four Democratic National Conventions. Martin was the president of the Natchez, Jackson, and Columbus Railroad, of which he oversaw the construction in 1884.

== Biography ==
=== Early life ===
William T. Martin was born on March 25, 1823, in Glasgow, Kentucky. He graduated from Centre College in 1844 and was admitted to the bar in Mississippi.

=== Career ===
He served multiple terms as district attorney before the war. While himself opposing secession, he raised the Adams County cavalry troops, when war broke out, riding with them to Richmond, Virginia, the new Confederate States of America capitol.

He quickly rose to colonel of the Jeff. Davis Legion, and served in J.E.B. Stuart's brigade during the Peninsular Campaign, seeing action at the Battle of Williamsburg; the Battle of Seven Pines; as well as Stuart's circumnavigation of the Union army while it stood on the doorsteps of Richmond. During the Seven Days Battles, Martin's men primarily participated in raids on Union supply lines north of the Chickahominy River. During the Northern Virginia Campaign, Martin and his legion were left in the vicinity of Richmond to watch McClellan's departing army, and was assigned to the cavalry brigade of Wade Hampton III. Hampton's brigade re-joined Robert E. Lee's Army of Northern Virginia for the Maryland Campaign. Martin's men were not present for the Battle of South Mountain but participated at the Battle of Antietam and Stuart's Chambersburg Raid. While the Confederate army was engaged at the Battle of Fredericksburg, the Jeff. Davis Legion was active in raids on Dumfries and Occoquan.

Promoted to brigadier general, in January 1863 Martin was ordered to the Western Theater, where he commanded divisions at the Tullahoma Campaign and the Battle of Chickamauga and served as cavalry commander under James Longstreet at Knoxville. After Longstreet's return to the east, he was promoted to major general, led a division under Major General Joseph Wheeler at Atlanta and rose to command of the military district of Northwest Mississippi by war's end.

After the war, he returned to his law practice in Mississippi, becoming a trustee of both University of Mississippi and Jefferson College in Washington, Mississippi. He served in the state senate, and was a delegate to Democratic National Conventions in 1868, 1872, 1876, and 1880. He was the president of the Natchez, Jackson, and Columbus railroad, of which he oversaw the construction in 1884. Martin is notable for opposing the Mississippi Constitution of 1890, ending black suffrage, being one of three delegates refusing to sign it. One of America's first black Congressmen, John R. Lynch, praised Martin in his memoirs for "reflecting the sentiments and respecting the wishes of the dominant and better element of the people of his county."

Martin also served as a primary source on the Forks of the Road slave market for historian Frederic Bancroft.

=== Personal life ===
Martin married Margaret (Dunlop Conner) Martin. They resided at Montaigne, a mansion in Natchez, Mississippi, now listed on the National Register of Historic Places. They had eleven children.

=== Death ===
Martin died on March 16, 1910, in Natchez, Mississippi.

== Legacy ==
Pattison, Mississippi was originally named Martin in honor of William Martin.

== See also ==
- List of American Civil War Generals (Confederate)
