= Lycée Montaigne =

Lycée Montaigne may refer to:

- Lycée Montaigne (Paris)
- Lycée Montaigne (Bordeaux)
- Lycée Montaigne de N'Djamena in Chad

== See also ==
- Montaigne (disambiguation)
