= Montaigne (Natchez, Mississippi) =

Historic house in Mississippi, United States

- Monteigne
- U.S. National Register of Historic Places
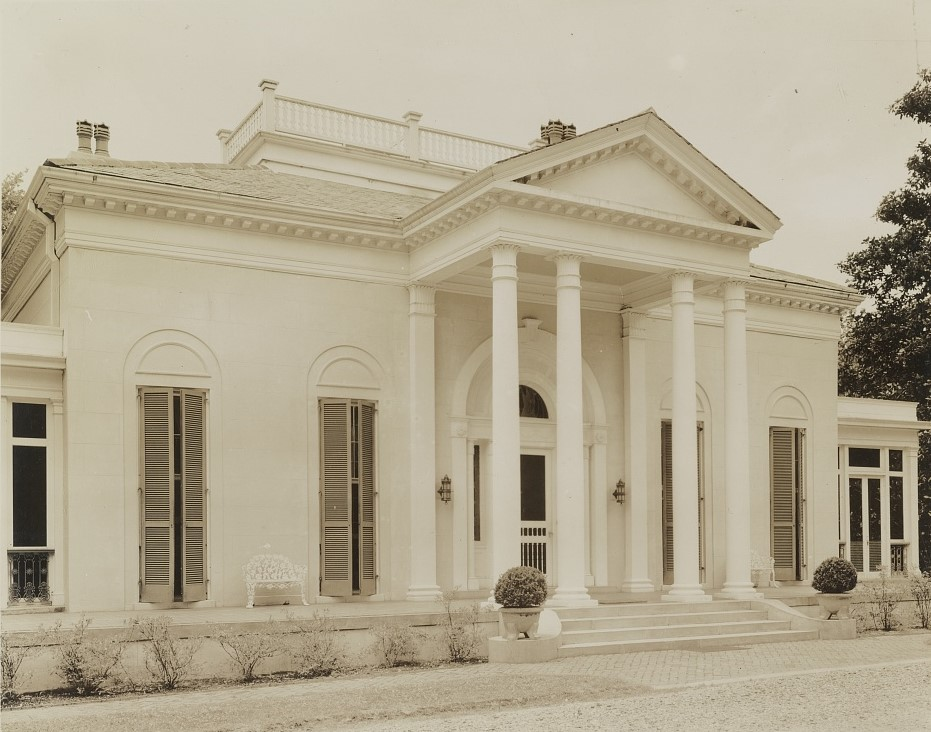
- Monteigne by Frances Benjamin Johnston, 1938

- Location within Mississippi Location within the United States
- Location: Liberty Rd., Natchez, Mississippi
- Area: 23.2 acres (9.4 ha)
- Built: 1855
- Architectural style: Classical Revival
- NRHP reference No.: 74001052
- Added to NRHP: December 11, 1974

Montaigne is a historic house in Natchez, Adams County, Mississippi.

== Location ==
It is located on Liberty Road in Natchez, Mississippi.

== History ==
The mansion was built in 1855 for General William T. Martin (1823-1910).

During the American Civil War of 1861–1865, the mansion was ravaged by Northerners and slaves, who smashed the chandeliers and cut the furniture to use it as firewood. However, after the war, Gen. Martin restored it, adding Chippendale furniture, wallpaper by Zuber & Cie, and Egyptian marble mantelpieces.

The garden spans 23 acres.

It has been added to the National Register of Historic Places since December 11, 1974.

From 1935 to 1937, the National Park Service contracted for construction of a new administration and museum building at the Vicksburg National Military Park. Bidders were given detailed plans for the new structure that resulted in an almost identical replica of Montaigne. The building was razed in 2025 in order to restore the area to its original historic setting.

== Gallery ==
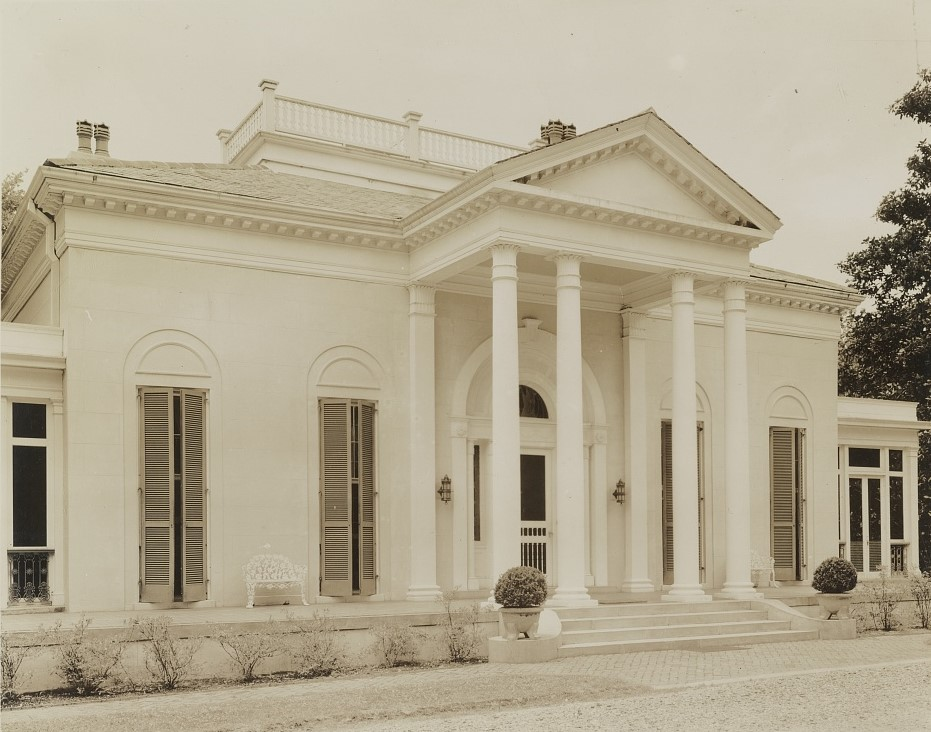
Montaigne, 1938

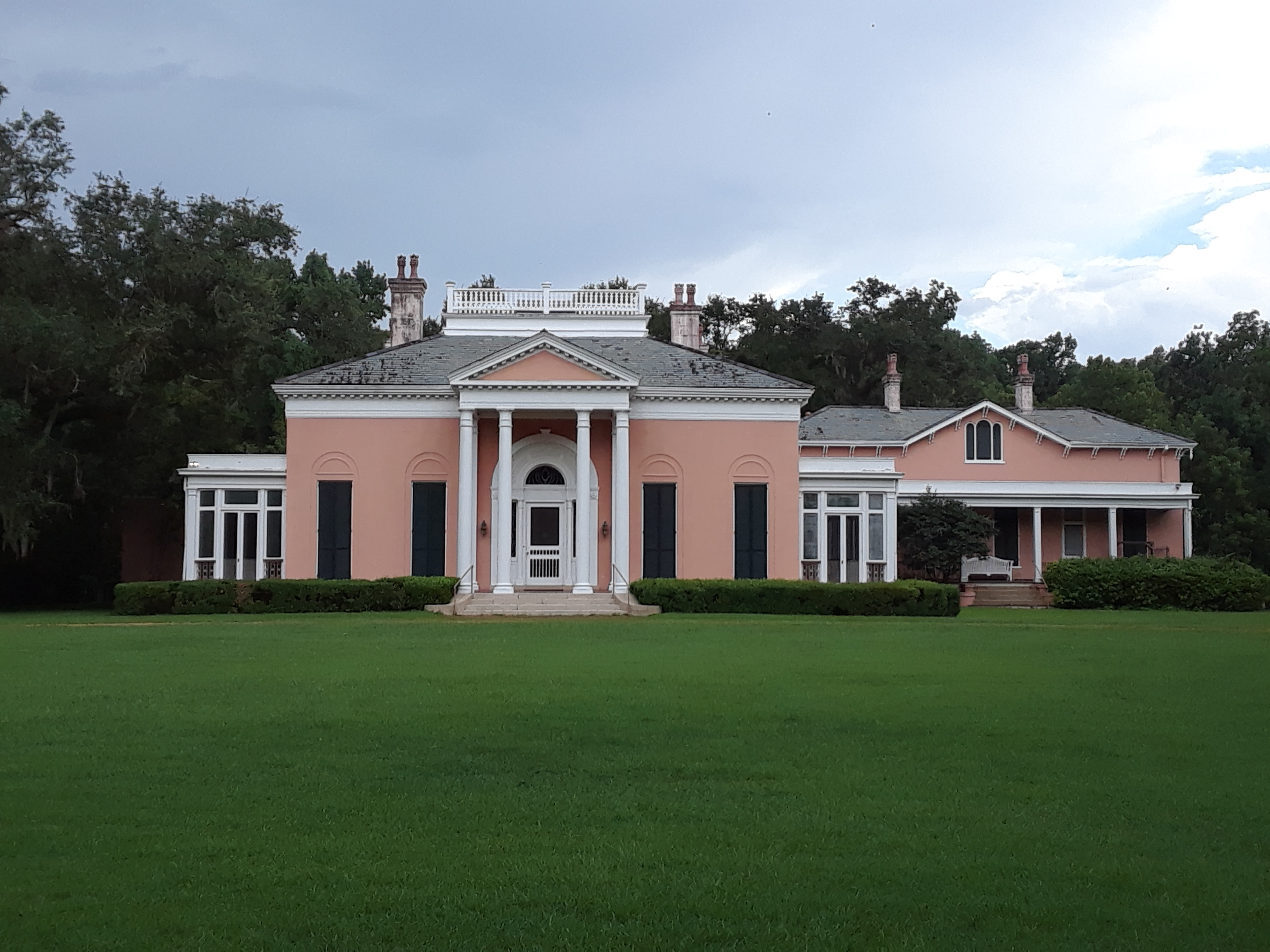
Front with grounds, 2017

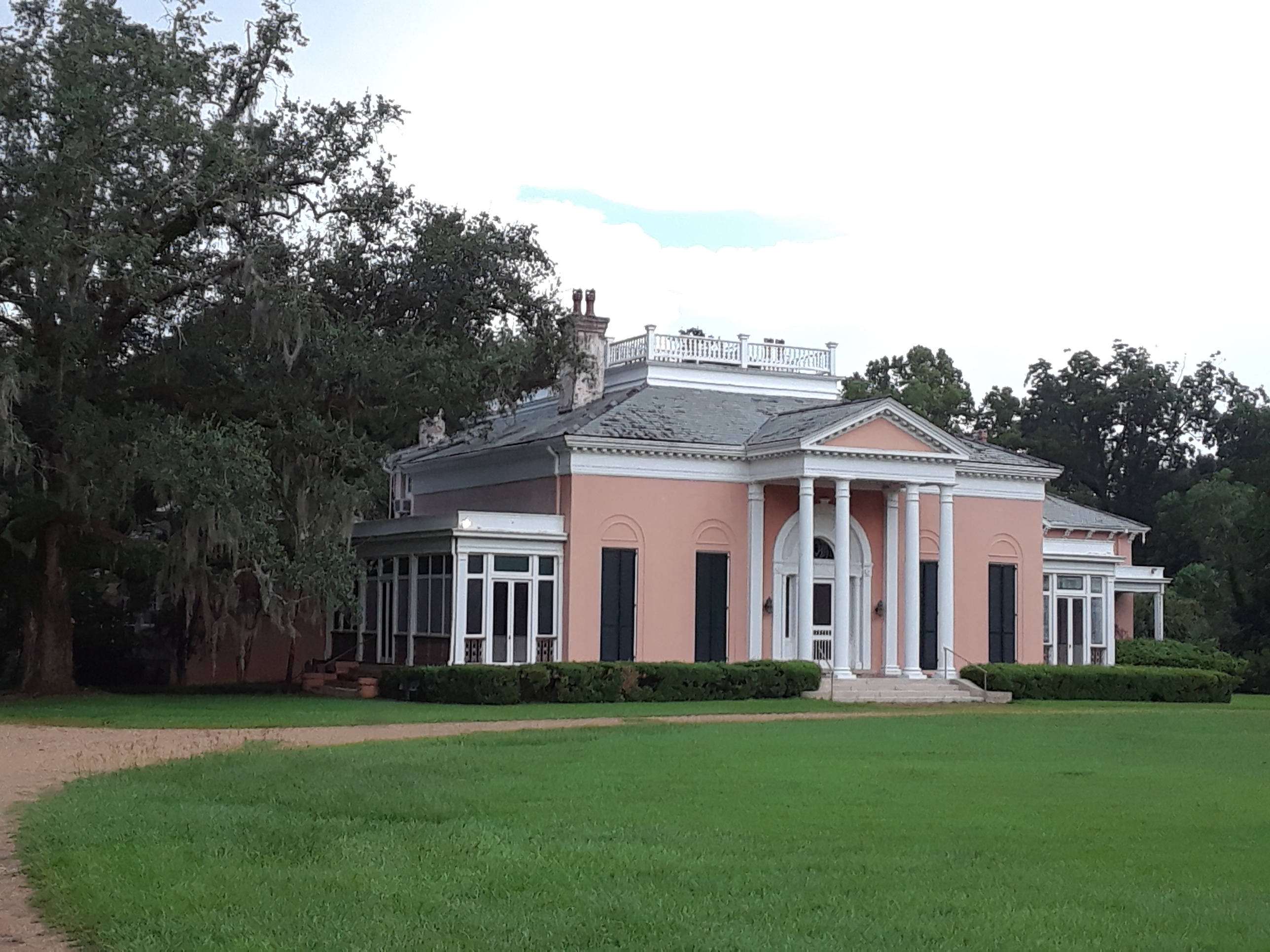
Front left, 2017

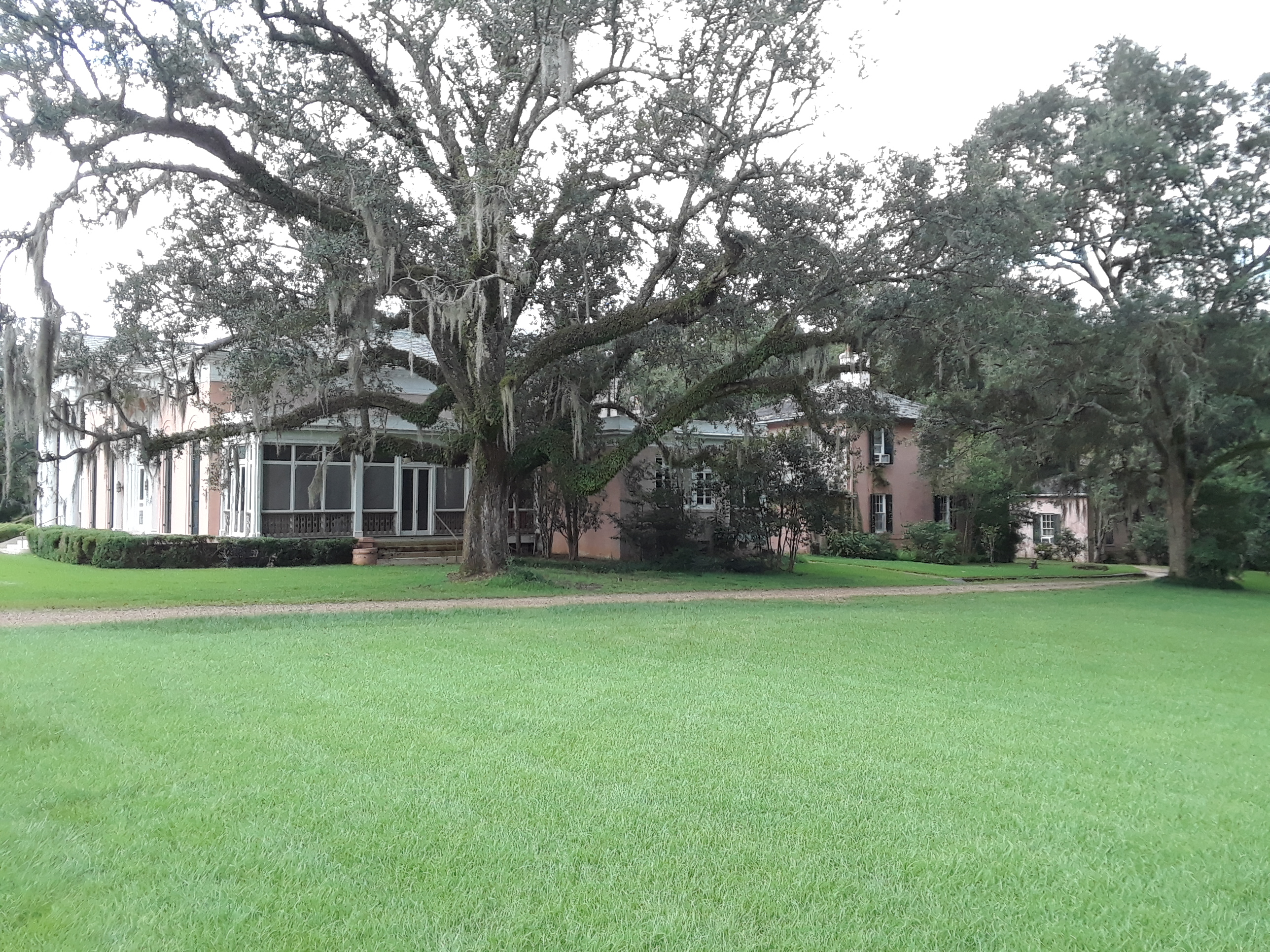
Front right, 2017

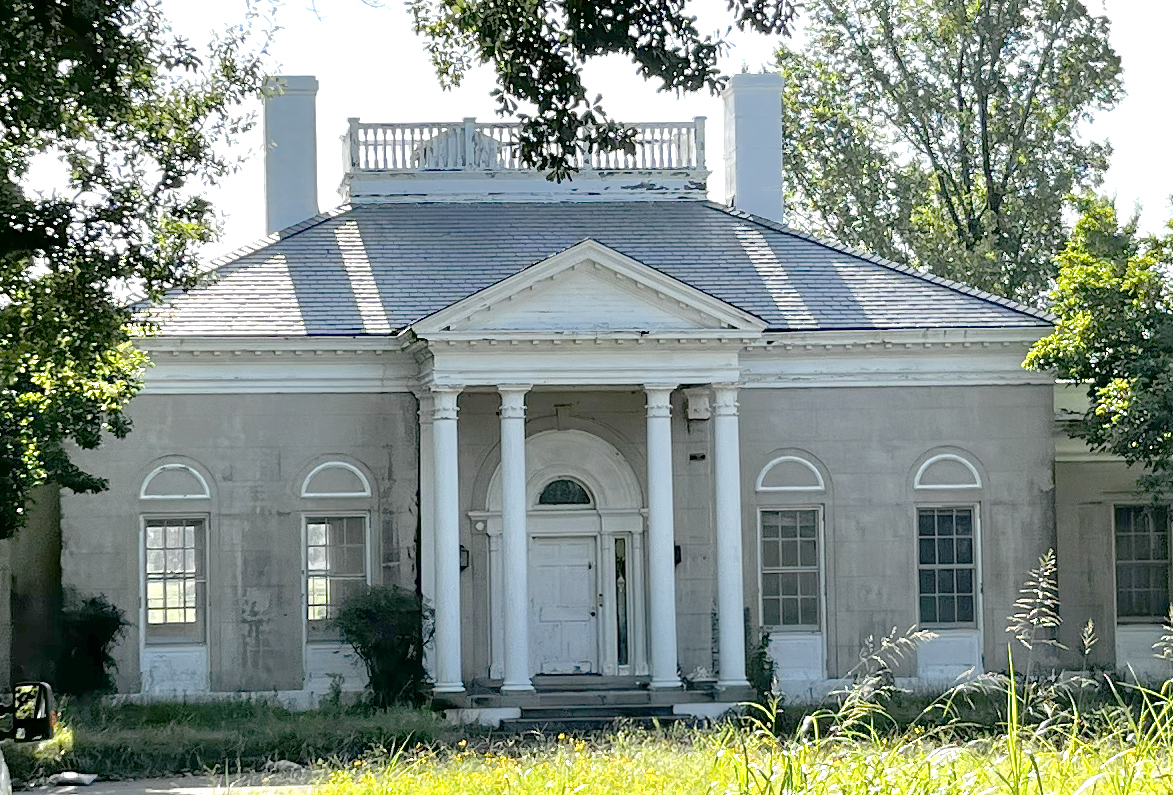
Vicksburg National Military Park Administration and Museum Building, built as a replica of Montaigne, 2025
