= La Montagne, Réunion =

Coordinates: 20°53′00″S 55°26′00″E

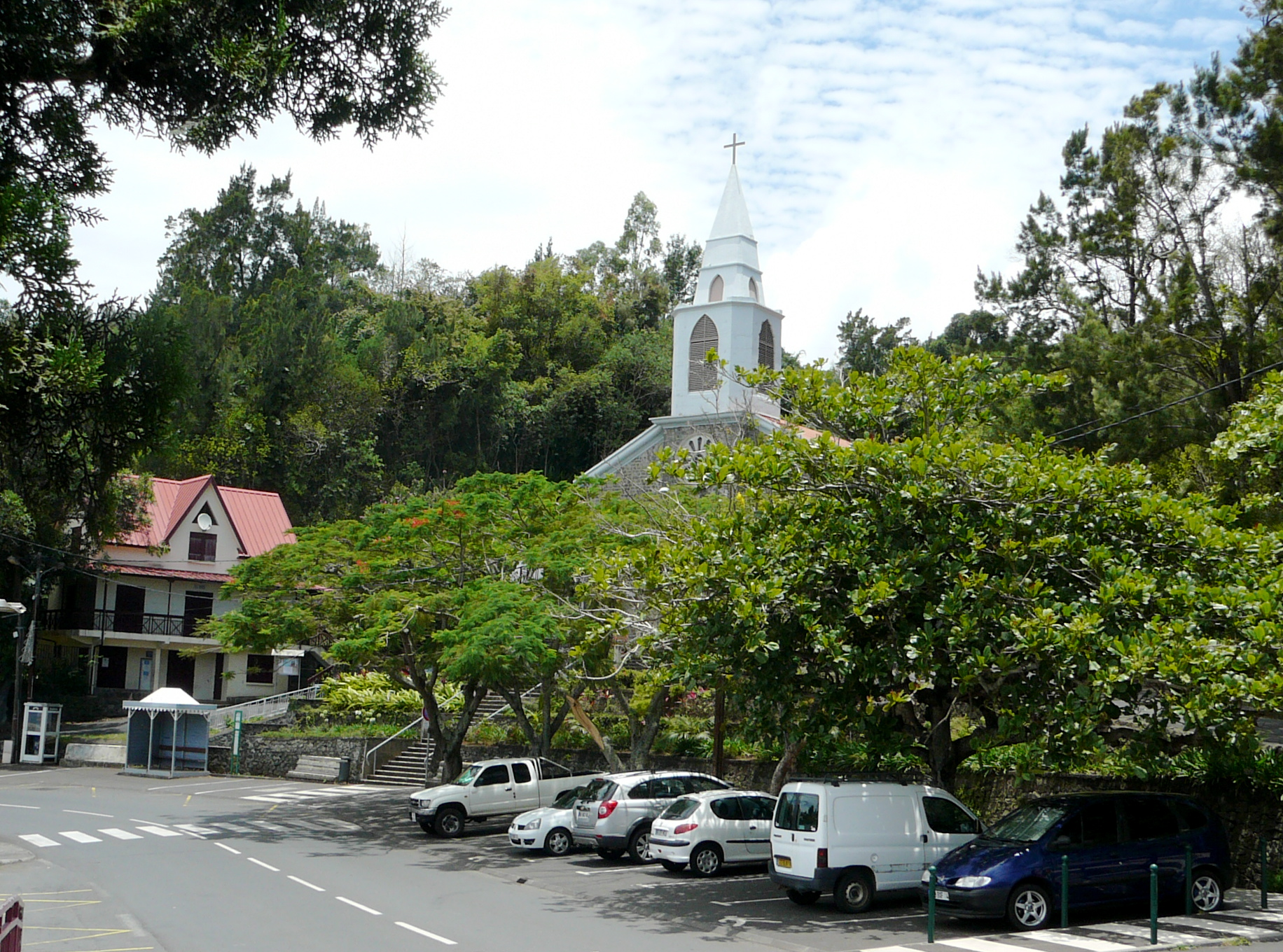
Center of La Montagne

La Montagne is a settlement within the commune of Saint-Denis, located along the north coast of the island of Réunion. Cape Bernard is located near the settlement.
