= Rene Lorenzo La Montagne =

American businessman (1856–1910)

René Lorenzo La Montagne (1856 – October 14, 1910) was an American businessman and champion polo player, and one of the founders of the Rockaway Hunt Club in Cedarhurst, New York on Long Island. He was treasurer and director of E. Montagne's Sons.

== Biography ==
He was born in 1856 and he later married Laura L. Morgan. His son Rene Morgan La Montagne was also a champion polo player. He died in 1910 of typhoid.
