= Cape Bernard =

Cape on the island of Réunion

Coordinates: 20°52′28.75″S 55°25′33.50″E

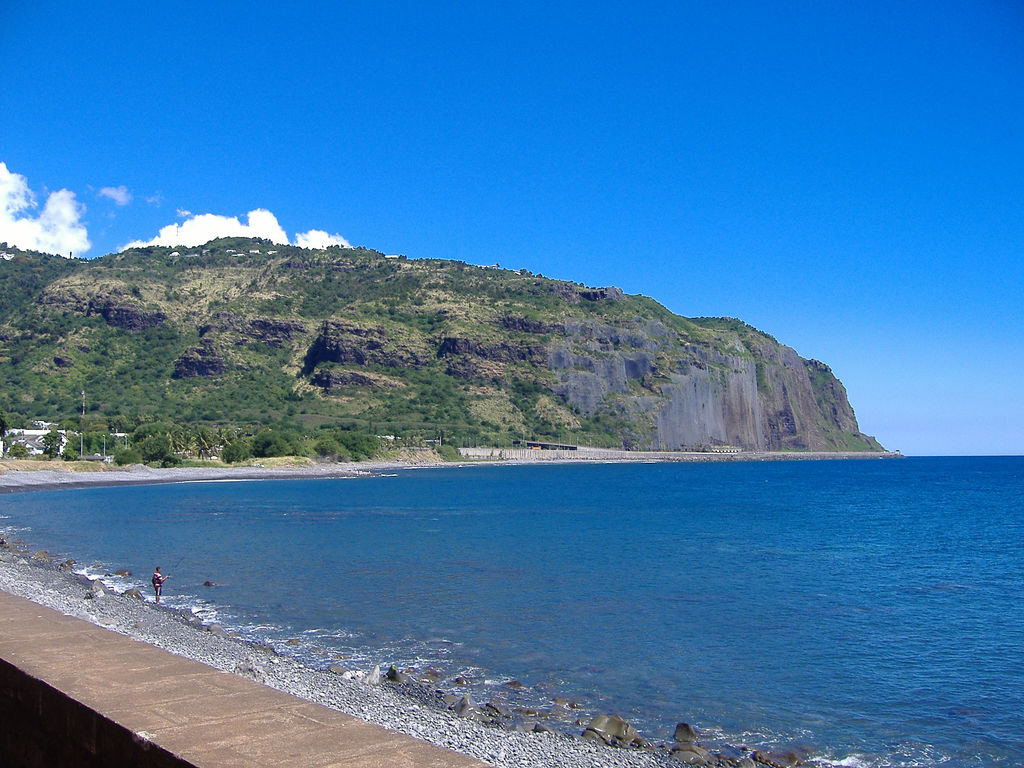

Cape Bernard is a cape on the island of Réunion. It is in the commune of Saint-Denis, along the northern coast of the island near the area of La Montagne. The route du Littoral crosses over the cape.
