= Rene La Montagne =

American polo player

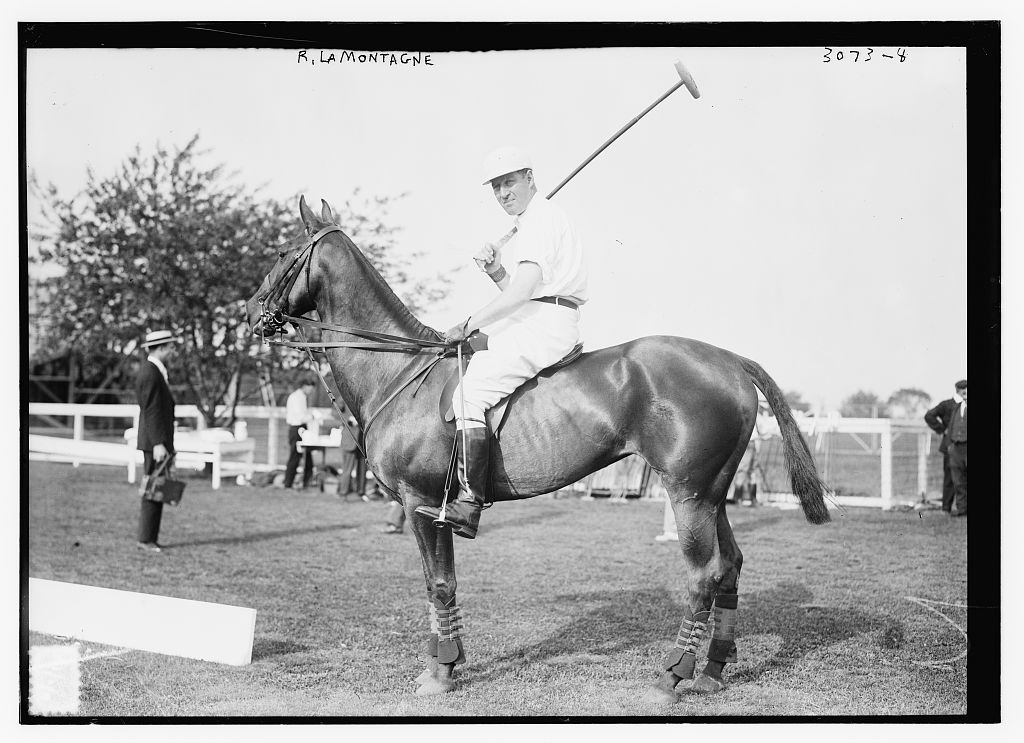
La Montagne in 1914

Rene Morgan La Montagne (December 23, 1882 – April 23, 1948) was an American polo player who in 1914 won the International Polo Cup.

== Biography ==
He was born on December 23, 1882, to Rene Lorenzo La Montagne (1856–1910). In 1920 he married Grace Argo Garrett.

He died in 1948 in Southampton, New York.
