= John and Alice Fullam House =

Historic house in Pennsylvania, United States

- John & Alice Fullam Residence
- U.S. National Register of Historic Places
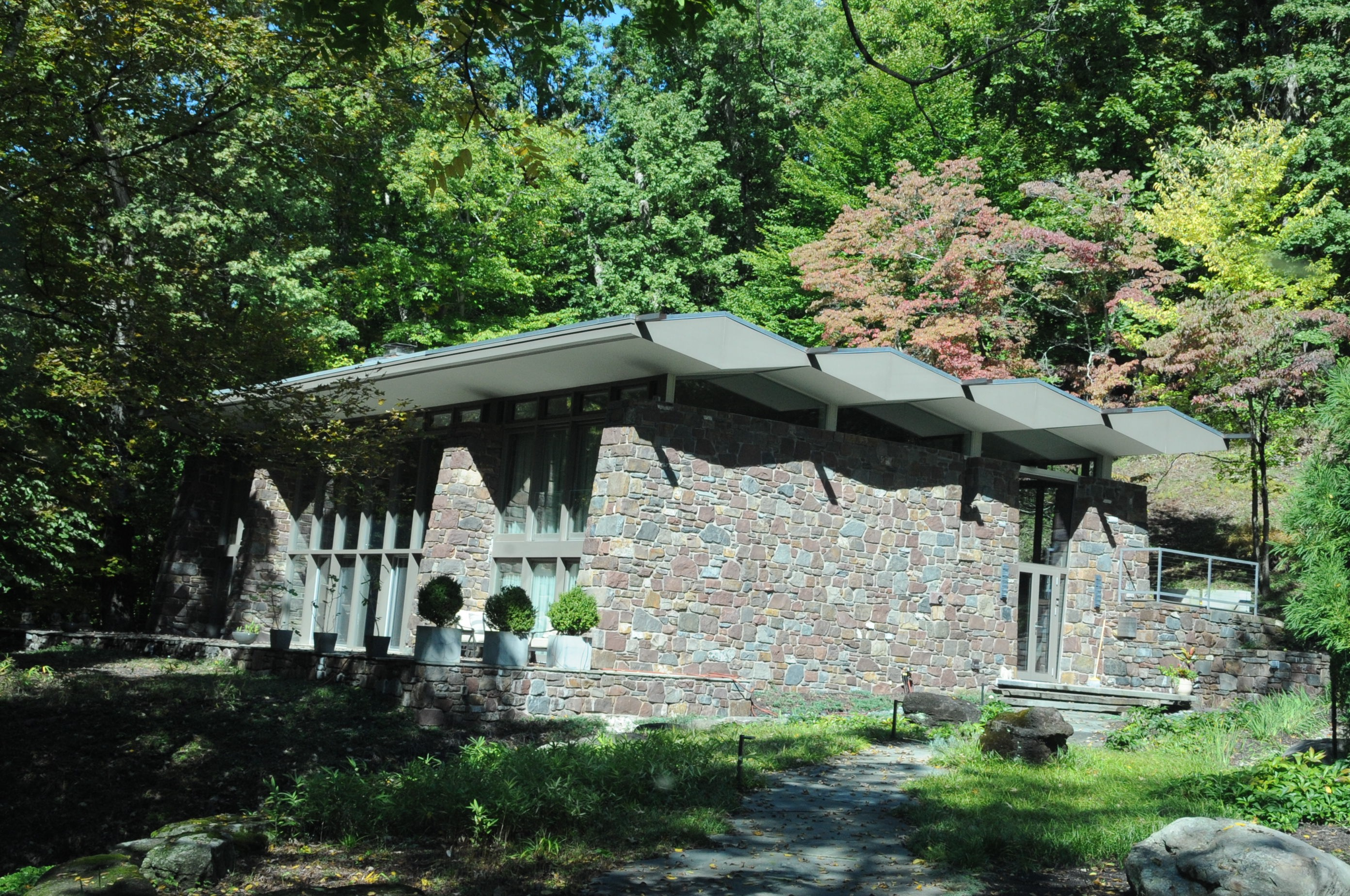
- Interactive map of John & Alice Fullam Residence
- Location: Wrightstown, Newtown, Pennsylvania
- Coordinates: 40°17′1″N 74°58′19″W
- Built: 1957-1959, 2017
- Architectural style: Modernist, Brutalist
- NRHP reference No.: 100003519
- Added to NRHP: March 15, 2019

The John and Alice Fullam Residence, designed in 1957 by modernist architect Paul Rudolph, is located in a rural part of Bucks County, Pennsylvania, in Wrightstown Township, approximately 4 miles (6 km) northwest of Newtown and 5.8 miles (9.3 km) west of the Delaware River. The house is situated on a ruggedly hilly, densely treed, almost 25-acre (10 ha) lot that was once part of an old logging trail. The Fullam Residence was listed to the National Register of Historic Places in 2019.

== Description ==
The two story, three-bay, 3,550-square-foot (330 m^{2}) stone house is sited on a steep hillside overlooking the junction of two tributaries of Jericho Creek. The house reflects the vernacular of the area, being constructed of local Pennsylvania field stone and is built into the hillside, similar to a Bucks County bank barn. Rudolph made an alternate design for the Residence where the walls are executed in poured in place concrete, and in the drawings outlines self registering forms to make the walls in a series of poured layers. An oversized stone patio on the southwesterly elevation anchors the house to the hillside offering views of the creeks below. The flagstone patio runs across the entire front of the house and extends beyond the exterior walls on both sides. Dramatic large windows fill almost the entire southwestern elevation; overlooking the creek, this wall of windows is sectioned into three bays by prominent stone buttress-like thick walls that extend beyond the windows. When viewed from the side, the building is in the form of a trapezoid where the southwest and northeast elevations are tapered with a wider base with a seven degree slope. The roof is distinctive, formed by a series of four horizontal diamond shapes supported on pillars, appearing to float above the structure, with scuppers that protrude horizontally between each ridge. The spaces between the diamonds, the supports and each buttress-like structure are filled with three pentagonal clearstory windows, giving the roof the illusion of floating above the walls.

== History ==
The residence is the earliest example of the sculptural architecture that would become Paul Rudolph's signature style, often labeled as a “Brutalist” because many of his designs were executed in raw concrete. His most noted commission was the Art & Architecture building at Yale University in New Haven, Connecticut completed in 1963. The Fullam Residence predates the A & A building, was begun in 1957 and completed in 1959. At the request of the owners, John and Alice Fullam, the design was never published and remained unknown in the Paul Rudolph Portfolio. In 2004, the original owners became concerned over the fate of the house, reading that many Rudolph structures were being destroyed and through their concern for preservation they made the Rudolph Foundation aware of the commission's existence.
