= Elion-Hitchings Building =

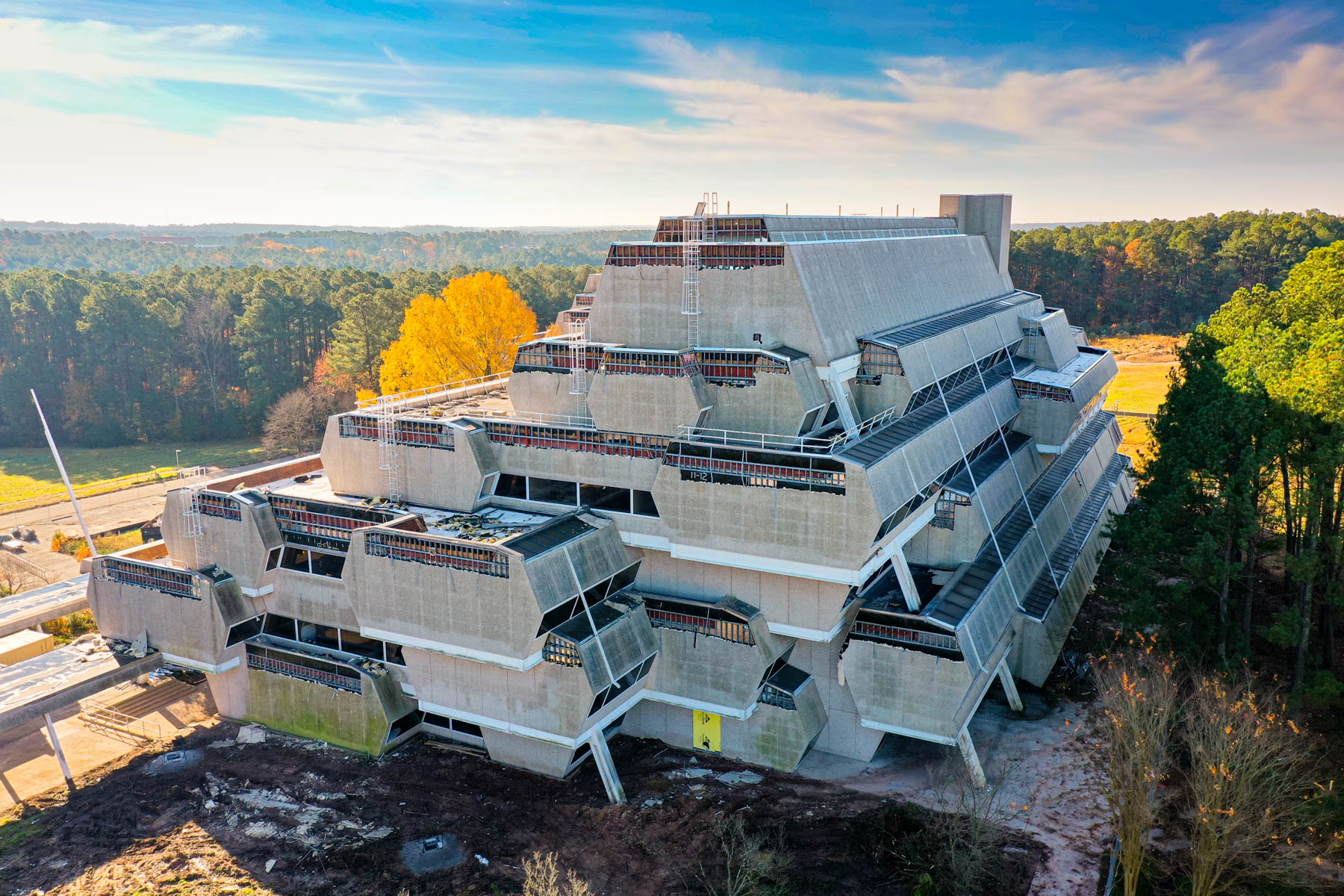
- Taken 11/29/2020

General information
- Architectural style: Brutalist
- Location: 3030 East Cornwallis Road, Research Triangle Park, North Carolina, U.S.
- Coordinates: 35.911971°N 78.869282°W
- Construction started: 1969
- Completed: 1972

Design and construction
- Architect: Paul Rudolph

The Elion-Hitchings Building was an architecturally significant brutalist building designed by Paul Rudolph and completed in 1972 as the headquarters for Burroughs Wellcome. The building, located on Cornwallis Road in Research Triangle Park, North Carolina, U.S., remained intact along with a later addition until it was demolished in its entirety January 2021, despite opposition.

== Background ==
Burroughs Wellcome & Company, founded in 1880 in London, established research and manufacturing facilities in the 1920s in Tuckahoe, New York, which served as the US headquarters until the company moved to Research Triangle Park in North Carolina in 1972. Being able to attract Burroughs Wellcome helped establish the significance of RTP as a national center for business.

When Burroughs Wellcome decided to move its headquarters in 1969, the company selected Paul Rudolph to design its new building, which would serve as both a headquarters and a research facility.

== The original building ==
The 300,000-square-foot building "was celebrated worldwide when it was built", according to Paul Rudolph Heritage Foundation president Kelvin Dickinson. Rudolph was known for brutalism, and a Historic American Buildings Survey dated 2018 said the building was "frequently described as Brutalist" and that its design was inspired by Frank Lloyd Wright's Fallingwater and Rudolph's work on Lower Manhattan Expressway. Rudolph's design was "an A-frame with terraced floors and angled walls and windows" with "an eccentrically loaded trapezoidal steel frame with columns inclined at 22.5 degrees". The design used concrete panels to create "an elongated hexagonal module that gives the building a strong horizontal reading on the long elevations". Also, the design uses "hexagonal geometry on the short elevations, pulling out of the building in different ways to express its ability to expand. In plan, the building wraps around two courts that face in opposite directions in a sort of S configuration." These courts act as a front porch entrance and a service court for the offices and laboratories. The entrance had three levels with columns suggesting Antebellum architecture and goes against the "form follows function" idea of Louis Sullivan, instead suggesting futuristic ideas but requiring a person to go inside to understand the building's purpose. The laboratories have high ceilings with skylights providing some of the lighting.

The futuristic appearance led to its use in the movie Brainstorm.

Rudolph himself said the building was "architecturally an extension of its site", meaning the wooded hills, and that the use of an A frame made it possible to put as much space as possible on lower floors, while the mechanical systems that needed less space could be at the top. He also said the building was designed to be expanded.

Myrick Howard of Preservation North Carolina said the building established that RTP was important. In 1996, Chuck Twardy of the News & Observer wrote, "The innovative building set the design standard for RTP and remains the park's most remarkable structure." The building was considered "a local landmark and symbol" not just for the company but for the park. While some of the more uptight employees wanted "innovation" but were dismayed when they saw how it appeared, the building became a symbol of what RTP meant and was even used in the park's promotional materials.

== Later developments ==
A 130,000-square-foot wing with more offices and a dining room was described as using characteristics of the original building, turning the original building into an L shape. Rudolph wanted the L eventually turned into a U-shape. The A-frame became a V which was repeated, but the angle for the structural steel in the original building was not used.

In 1988 the building was named after the Nobel Prize winning scientists Gertrude B. Elion and George H. Hitchings, who worked at Burroughs Wellcome and invented drugs still used many years later.

Glaxo P.L.C. acquired Wellcome P.L.C. in 1995 and GlaxoWellcome merged with SmithKline Beecham in 2000 to form GlaxoSmithKline.

GlaxoSmithKline moved all of its operations from Cornwallis Road and Maughn Road to Moore Drive in 2011. United Therapeutics, which opened a research and manufacturing facility in 2009 next door, bought the building from GlaxoSmithKline along with 140 acres and two other buildings, for $17.5 million in a deal that closed in June 2012. The new owner tore down 400,000 square feet of the buildings in 2014, while promising to make an effort to save the remaining 150,000 square feet. According to Dickinson, United Therapeutics actually did nothing other than offer tours, while the building continued to deteriorate. In 2018, the status was "renovation and extension planned".

== Demolition ==
United Therapeutics received a permit on September 4, 2020, to tear down the remainder of the building, saying it was too deteriorated and too expensive to renovate. Design critic Alexandra Lange and modern architecture conservation non-profit Docomomo International announced the news September 10 on social media, and Dickinson said making people around the world aware was the key to saving the building. Late in September 2020, a petition opposing this action had 2500 signatures.

On January 18, 2021, images appeared on Twitter showing the last standing portions of the building being torn down.
