= Bass Residence =

Single family home designed by Paul Rudolph

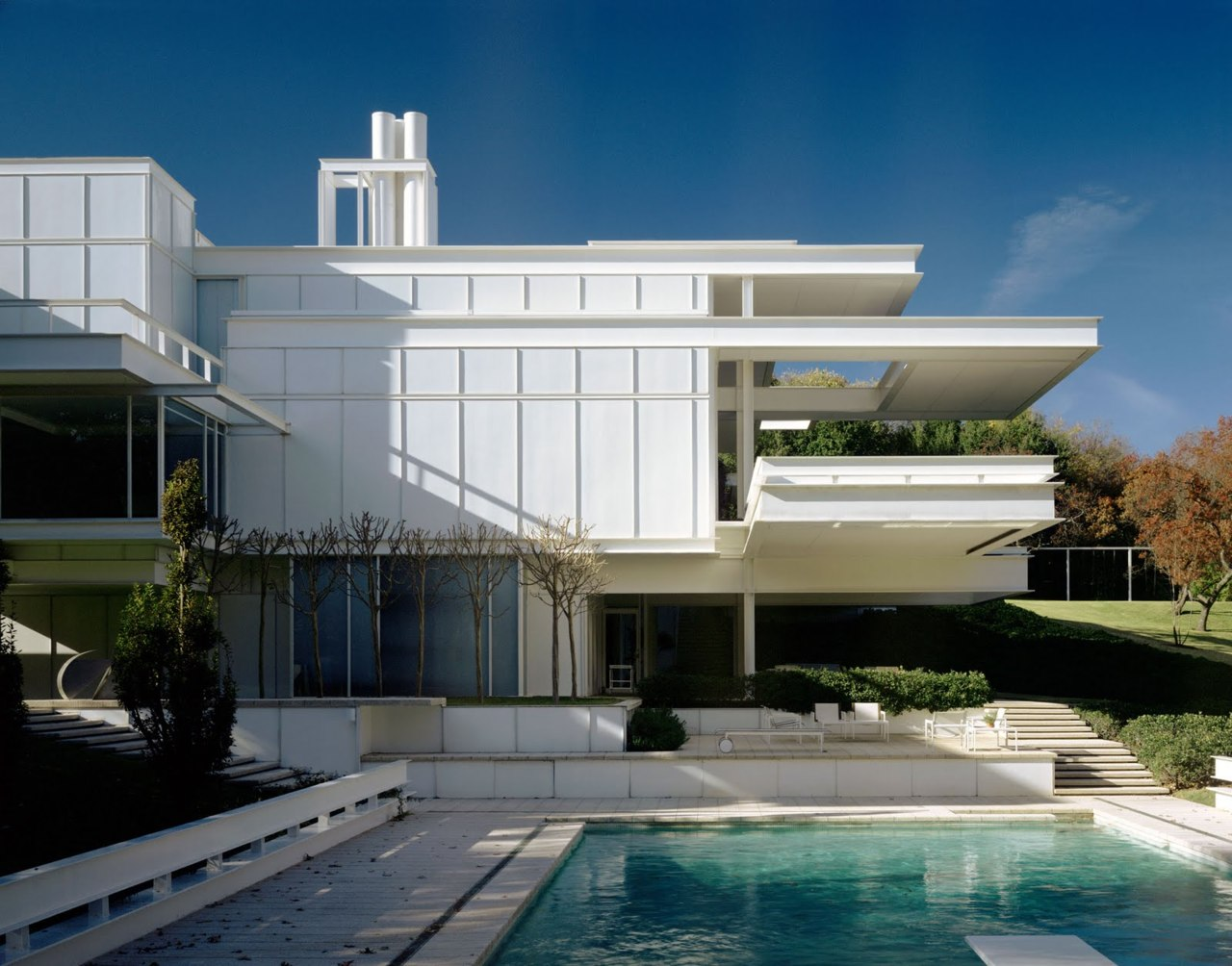
- Bass Residence

General information
- Status: Completed
- Type: Single family home
- Location: Fort Worth, Texas, United States
- Construction started: Designed in 1966
- Completed: 1970
- Owner: Sid and Anne Bass

Technical details
- Material: White enameled structural-steel, white porcelain-enameled aluminum
- Floor count: 4
- Floor area: 18,270 feet (5,570 m)

Design and construction
- Architect: Paul Rudolph
- Other designers: Landscape: Robert Zion, Russell Page

The Bass Residence (1970) is a home in Fort Worth, Texas classified as Modern architecture and designed by architect Paul Rudolph, a founder of the Sarasota School of Architecture, and he designed the home in that style. It was designed for Sid Bass and Anne Bass. The house features cantilevered horizontal shapes.

== History ==
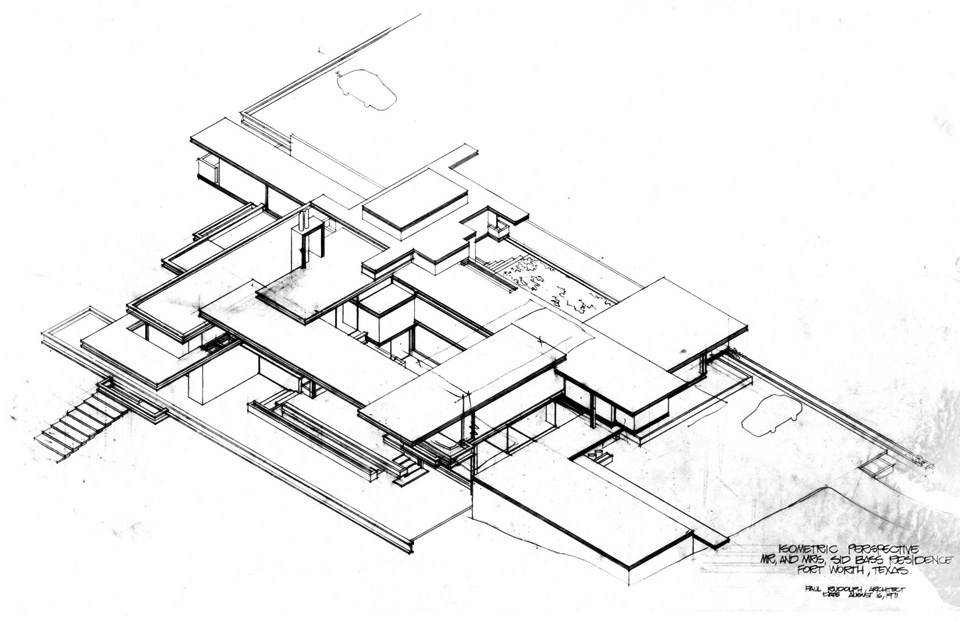
Paul Rudolph sketch showing overhead view of the many levels of the Bass Residence

The home is an extravagant white multilevel structure which can be classified as Modern architecture. The single-family home was designed by Paul Rudolph for Sid and Anne Bass in 1966. Sid Bass was a billionaire who made his fortune in the oil business. Bass commissioned the home while he was a young man. The grounds included a swimming pool and a courtyard for vehicles. The entrance is found at the uppermost level of the home. The driveway extends out of the east portion of the home and leads to the entrance. Above the entrance there is the dramatic feature of a horizontal 40 ft (12 m) cantilevered overhang. The architect, Paul Rudolph, claimed the Bass house was the best home he had designed.

== Design ==
The home is built around a steel frame which is covered by glass and aluminum. The design draws from those of Frank Lloyd Wright and Ludwig Mies van der Rohe. It reflects a minimalist approach and straight lines. There are no curves in the home. The house features cantilevered horizontal shapes overlapping each other surrounding a courtyard. Inside there are four floors which have 12 level changes and there are 14 separate ceiling heights. It is said to resemble Frank Lloyd Wright's Fallingwater design. The building's design constructs an illusion of levitating horizontal planes: vertical planes are disguised by the cantilevered planes.

The landscape, totalling 8 acres (3.2 ha), was originally designed by landscape architect Robert Zion. From 1981 to 1982 another landscape architect Russell Page worked on a redesign of the estate's grounds. He stated "...the structure needs the tranquillity of an all green base." According to his plans, the grounds had few flowers and one rose garden. The grounds also include a reflecting pool with a nude sculpture.

== Plans ==
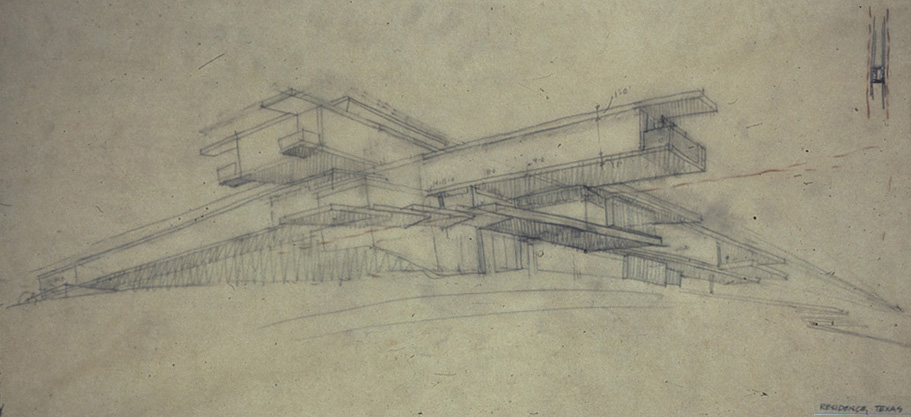

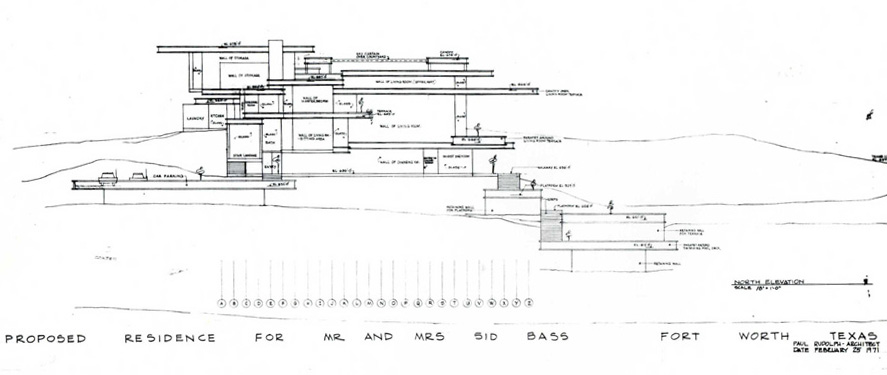

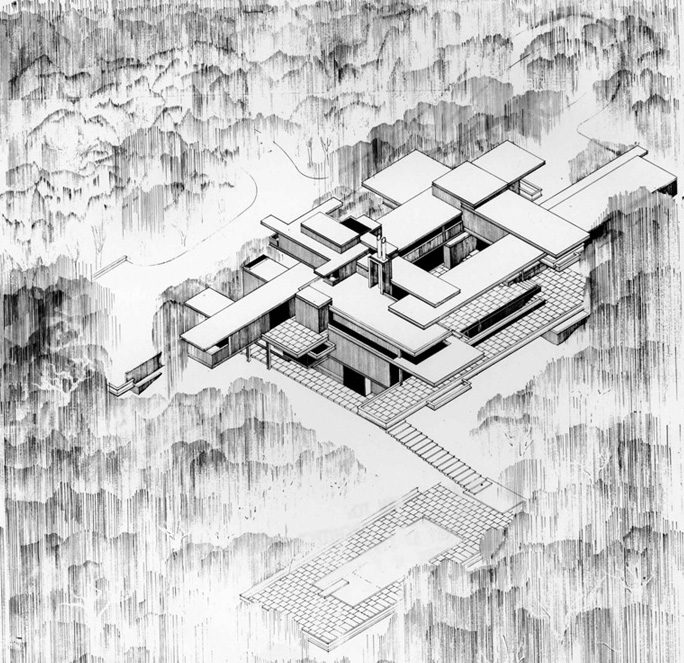
