= Milam Residence =

Sarasota Modern house in Ponte Vedra Beach, Florida

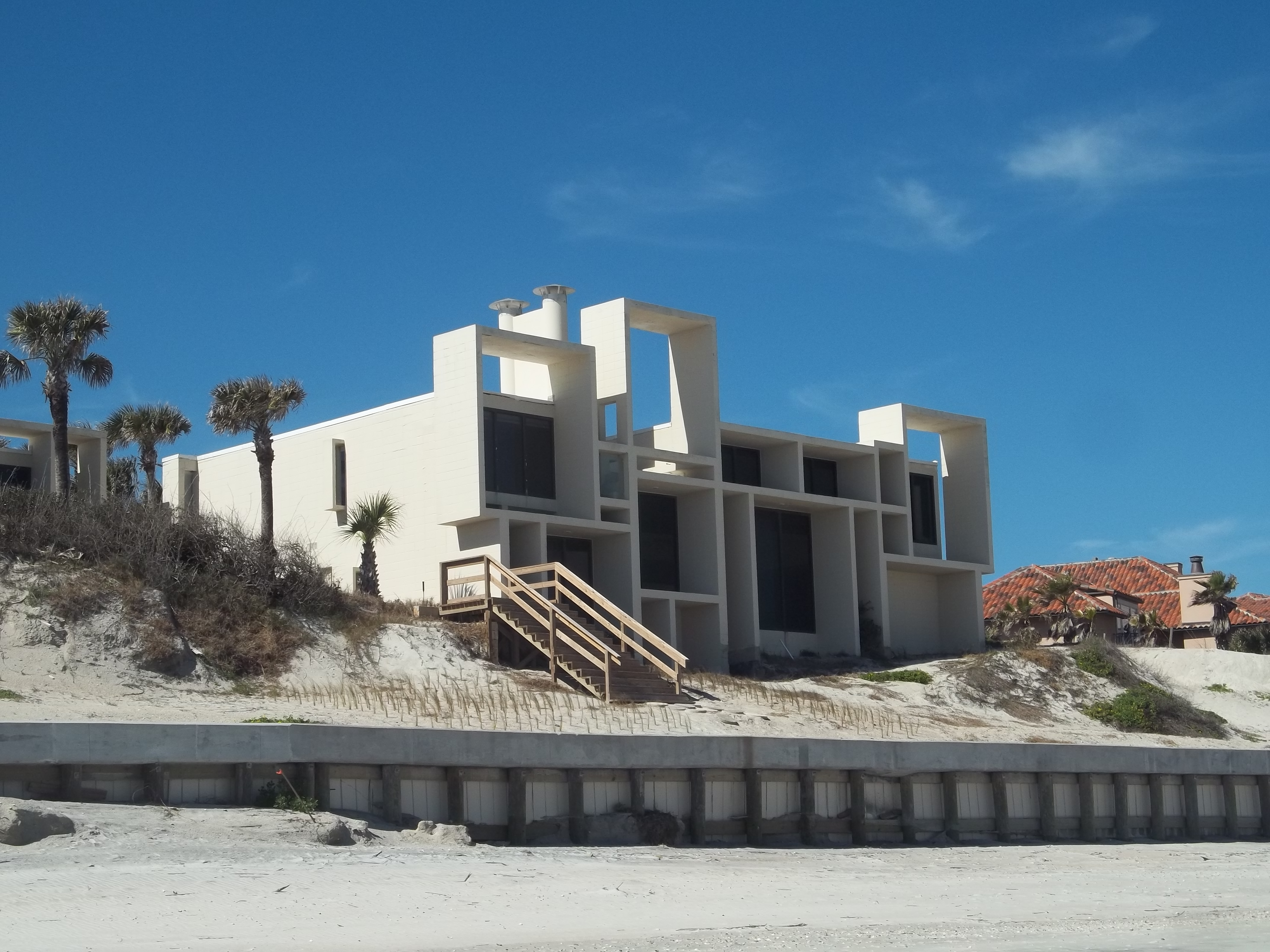
- Interactive map of the Milam Residence area
- Alternative names: The House of Seven Levels

General information
- Type: Single-family home
- Architectural style: Late modernism and Cubist architecture
- Location: 1033 Ponte Vedra Blvd., Ponte Vedra Beach, Florida, US
- Coordinates: 30°10′26″N 81°21′34″W
- Completed: 1961
- Cost: $88,074
- Client: Arthur W. Milam
- Owner: Jonathan and Sheila Lee Davies

Technical details
- Material: Concrete and glass
- Floor area: 6,858 feet (2,090 m)
- Grounds: 2 acres (0.81 ha)

Design and construction
- Architect: Paul Rudolph
- Awards and prizes: One of Architectural Record's 20 "Record Houses" of 1963

U.S. National Register of Historic Places
- Designated: June 7, 2016
- Reference no.: #16000323

Milam Residence is an oceanfront residence in Ponte Vedra Beach, Florida, United States. It was designed by architect Paul Rudolph in the style of Sarasota Modern. The late modernist home has an unusual facade of large geometrical shapes facing the ocean. Completed in 1961, it was one of Architectural Record's 20 "Record Houses" of 1963. In 2016, it was added to the National Register of Historic Places.

== History ==
The Milam Residence was completed in 1961 and named after Arthur W. Milam, the philanthropist who commissioned the project. It was designed in the style of the Sarasota Modern by architect Paul Rudolph. Rudolph designed almost 60 homes in Florida, and the Milam Residence was the last one. The home appears on the cover of Rudolph's 2002 book, Paul Rudolph: The Florida Houses. In 1963, the home was named one of Architectural Record's 20 "Record Houses".

Rudolph returned to design other outbuildings when Milam was married in 1969: the additions included a small guest house, a three-car garage, and a swimming pool. The building was added to the National Register of Historic Places in 2016.

The building was put up for sale in 2017 and 2020. Jonathan and Sheila Lee Davies purchased the building for $3.45 million, approximately $1 million under the asking price. Sheila Lee Davies, an Atlanta-based architect, planned to repair the building at an estimated cost of $1.3 million. However, as of 2026, no renovation has taken place.

== Design ==
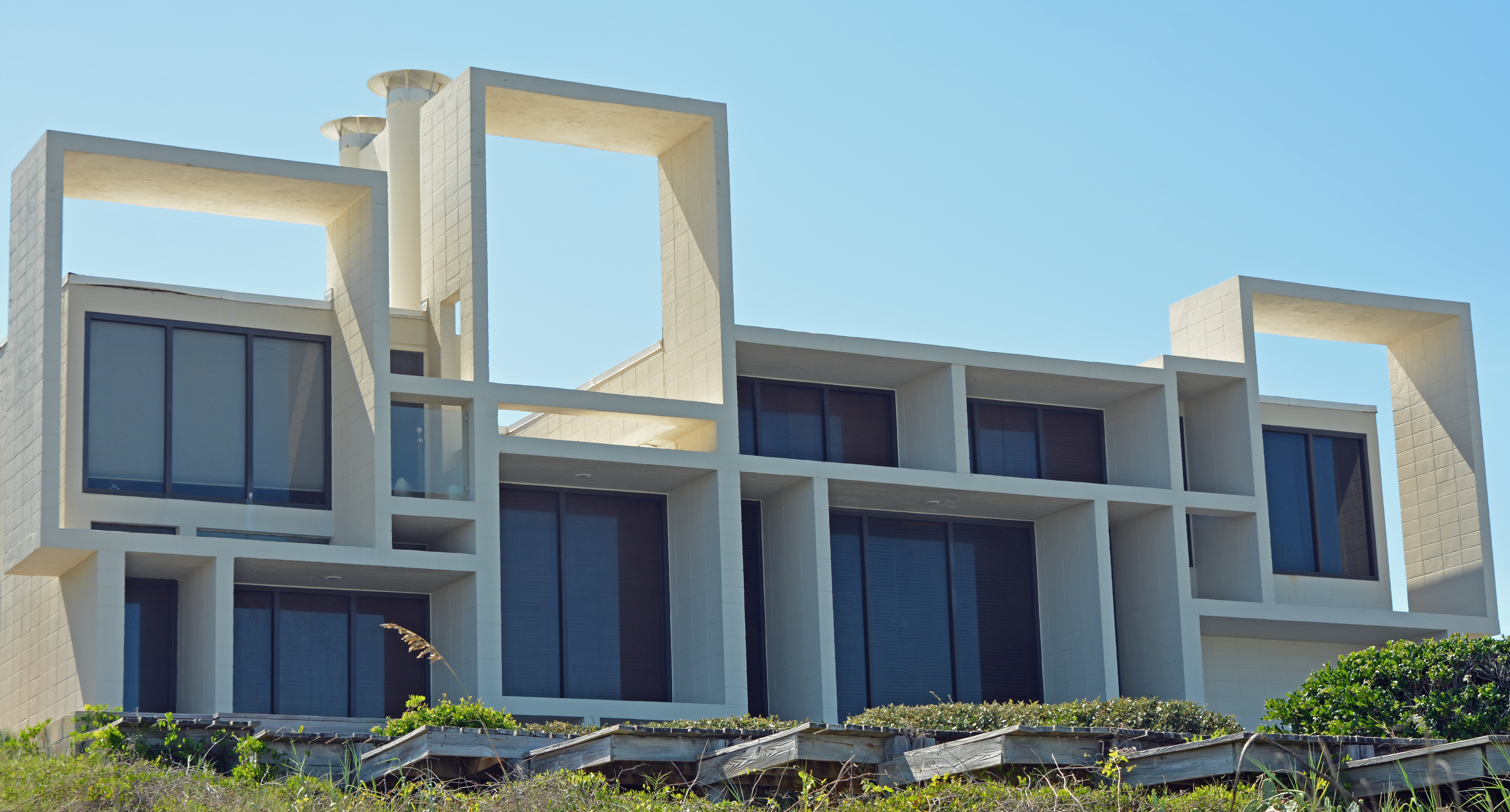
The ocean-facing facade of squares and rectangles

The home has 6,858 square feet (637.1 m^{2}) and sits on 2 acres (0.81 ha), 60 feet (18 m) above the Atlantic Ocean. It has four bedrooms and two bathrooms.

Rudolph designed the home with an orthogonal facade; the geometric shapes are a striking and unusual visual element. The building has been referred to as an example of late modernist and Cubist architecture. The squares and rectangles are not only a striking visual element, they also serve a purpose by providing shade to the interior rooms. The large overhang and side extension of the facade elements provide shade for the building interior. Additionally, the large openings have floor to ceiling glass which deflect sun and wind. The Milam Residence was the first residential property designed by Rudolph which included air conditioning. The air conditioning allowed Rudolph to design the home without worrying about the Florida weather.

The Sarasota School of Architecture was known for designing buildings with straight lines, and seamless transitions between indoor-outdoor spaces. The architects of that school attempted to make use of natural elements like wind and outdoor light. In keeping with the Sarasota ideology, Rudolph tried to connect the inside and outside spaces with the design. One example of this method is where he designed the home with terrazzo floors matching the color of the nearby sand.

The interior has rooms which are elongated and parallel to the ocean with large windows. The home has been referred to as "The House of Seven Levels". The interior features built-in storage and level changes. There are functional interior floor-level changes: a sunken living room. There are also level changes in ceiling height: a lowered ceiling in some areas and raised ceiling in others.

== See also ==
- High-tech architecture
- Modern architecture
