= Abraham Lincoln Freedman =

American judge (1904–1971)

Judge of the United States Court of Appeals for the Third Circuit
- In office July 2, 1964 – March 13, 1971
- Appointed by: Lyndon B. Johnson
- Preceded by: Herbert Funk Goodrich
- Succeeded by: Joseph F. Weis Jr.

Judge of the United States District Court for the Eastern District of Pennsylvania
- In office September 22, 1961 – July 6, 1964
- Appointed by: John F. Kennedy
- Preceded by: Seat established by 75 Stat. 80
- Succeeded by: John P. Fullam

Personal details
- Born: Abraham Lincoln Freedman; November 19, 1904 Trenton, New Jersey
- Died: March 13, 1971 (aged 66)
- Education: Temple University Beasley School of Law (LLB)

Abraham Lincoln Freedman (November 19, 1904 – March 13, 1971) was a United States circuit judge of the United States Court of Appeals for the Third Circuit and previously was a United States district judge of the United States District Court for the Eastern District of Pennsylvania.

== Education and career ==
Born in Trenton, New Jersey, Freedman received a Bachelor of Laws from Temple University Beasley School of Law in 1926, immediately entering private practice in Philadelphia, Pennsylvania. While in private practice, Freedman was of general counsel to the Philadelphia Housing Authority from 1938 to 1949 and was of counsel to the Philadelphia Housing Association from 1940 to 1961. He was special counsel for housing to the Pennsylvania Post-War Planning Commission from 1944 to 1946, and was a special counsel to the Redevelopment Authority of Philadelphia from 1946 to 1947. He left private practice to become the city solicitor for Philadelphia from 1952 to 1956, then returned to private practice until 1961.

== Federal judicial service ==
Freedman was nominated by President John F. Kennedy on September 1, 1961, to the United States District Court for the Eastern District of Pennsylvania, to a new seat authorized by 75 Stat. 80. He was confirmed by the United States Senate on September 14, 1961, and received his commission on September 22, 1961. His service terminated on July 6, 1964, due to elevation to the Third Circuit.

Freedman was nominated by President Lyndon B. Johnson on April 15, 1964, to a seat on the United States Court of Appeals for the Third Circuit vacated by Judge Herbert Funk Goodrich. He was confirmed by the Senate on July 2, 1964, and received his commission on July 2, 1964. His service terminated on March 13, 1971, due to his death.

== See also ==
- List of Jewish American jurists

== Sources ==
- Retrieved 2009-05-27.

Legal offices
Preceded by Seat established by 75 Stat. 80	Judge of the United States District Court for the Eastern District of Pennsylvania; 1961–1964	Succeeded by John P. Fullam
Preceded by Herbert Funk Goodrich	Judge of the United States Court of Appeals for the Third Circuit; 1964–1971	Succeeded by Joseph F. Weis Jr.
