= Spaces: The Architecture of Paul Rudolph =

1983 film

- Directed by: Bob Eisenhardt
- Produced by: Bob Eisenhardt
- Narrated by: Cliff Robertson
- Cinematography: John Corso
- Production company: Eisenhardt Productions
- Distributed by: Museum of Modern Art, Circulating Film Library
- Release date: 1983
- Running time: 29 minutes
- Country: United States
- Language: English

Spaces: The Architecture of Paul Rudolph is a 1983 American short documentary film narrated by Cliff Robertson and produced by Bob Eisenhardt about the work of architect Paul Rudolph. It was nominated for an Academy Award for Best Documentary Short.
