= John P. Fullam =

American judge

John Patrick Fullam
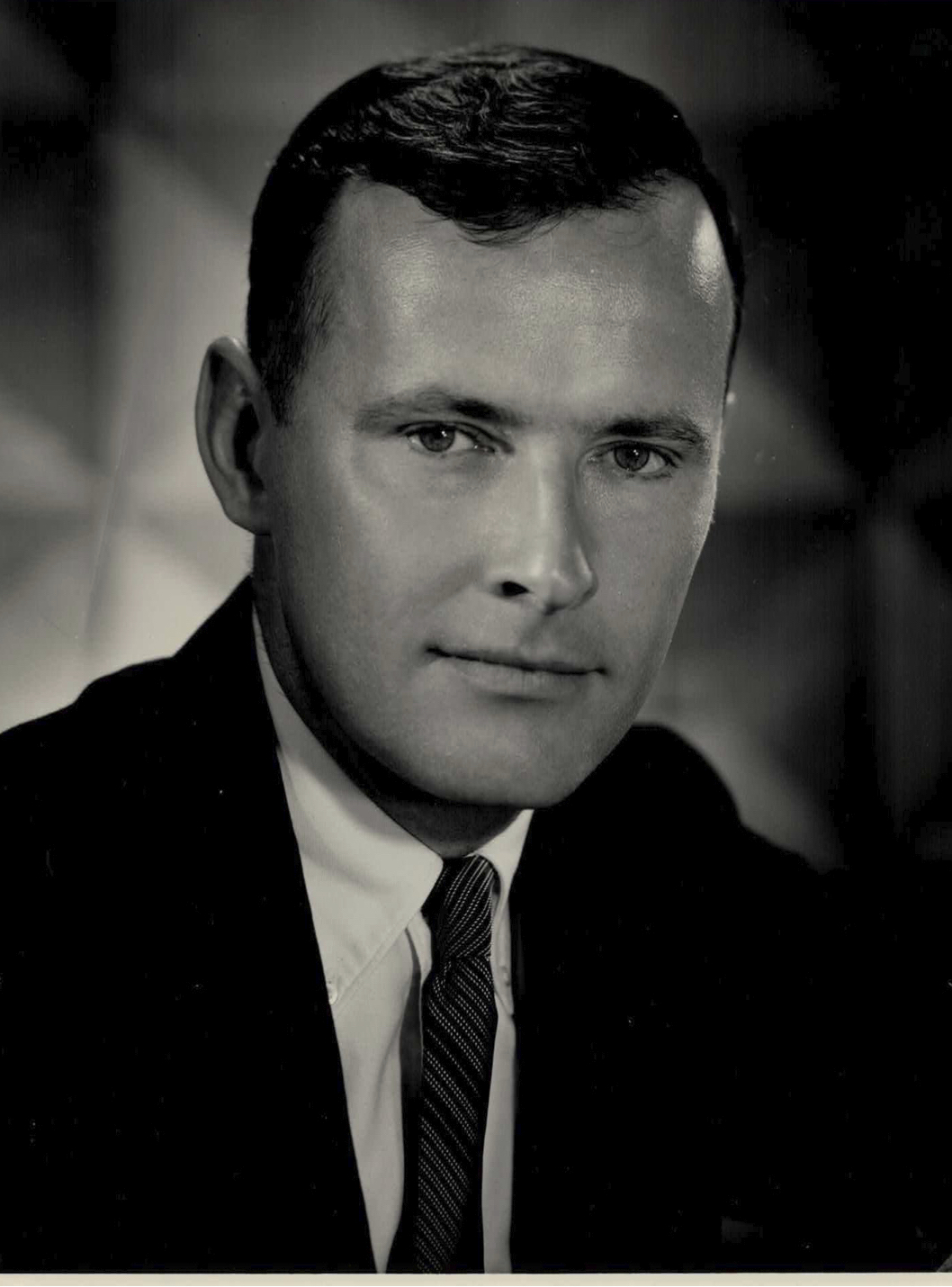

Senior Judge of the United States District Court for the Eastern District of Pennsylvania
- In office April 1, 1990 – March 8, 2018

Chief Judge of the United States District Court for the Eastern District of Pennsylvania
- In office 1986–1990
- Preceded by: Alfred Leopold Luongo
- Succeeded by: Louis Bechtle

Judge of the United States District Court for the Eastern District of Pennsylvania
- In office August 11, 1966 – April 1, 1990
- Appointed by: Lyndon B. Johnson
- Preceded by: Abraham Lincoln Freedman
- Succeeded by: William H. Yohn Jr.

Personal details
- Born: John Patrick Fullam; December 10, 1921 Gardenville, Pennsylvania
- Died: March 8, 2018 (aged 96) Wallingford, Pennsylvania
- Education: Villanova University (B.S.); Harvard Law School (J.D.)

John Patrick Fullam (December 10, 1921 – March 8, 2018) was a United States district judge of the United States District Court for the Eastern District of Pennsylvania.

== Education and career ==
Born in Gardenville, Pennsylvania, Fullam graduated from Villanova University with a Bachelor of Science degree in 1942. From 1942 to 1948 Fullam served in the United States Navy Reserve. He received his Juris Doctor from Harvard Law School in 1948. From 1948 to 1960 he worked in private practice in Bristol, Pennsylvania. He was the Democratic candidate for the U.S. House of Representatives from Pennsylvania's 8th District in the 1954 and 1956 elections but was defeated by Karl C. King and Willard S. Curtin, respectively. From 1960 to 1966 he was a Judge on the Court of Common Pleas for Bucks County, Pennsylvania.

== Federal judicial service ==
On January 19, 1966 President Lyndon Johnson nominated Fullam to the Eastern District, to a seat vacated by Judge Abraham Lincoln Freedman. Fullam was confirmed by the United States Senate on August 10, 1966, and received commission on August 11, 1966. Fullam served as Chief Judge from 1986 to 1990 and assumed senior status on April 1, 1990. He took inactive senior status on April 15, 2011.

== Notable cases ==
During his 45 years on the Federal bench, Fullam presided over such cases as the bankruptcy of the Penn Central Transportation Company, the largest corporate bankruptcy at that time, and the Abscam political corruption probe.

== Personal life and death ==
Fullam met his wife Alice while in law school at Harvard, and the two married in 1950. They commissioned the architect Paul Rudolph to design a home for their family in Wrightstown, Pennsylvania. The residence was designated a National Historic Place in 2019. The couple raised four children and remained married until Alice's death in 2016. John Fullam died on March 8, 2018, at Plush Mills Senior Living in Wallingford, Pennsylvania.

== See also ==
- List of United States federal judges by longevity of service

== Sources ==
Legal offices
Preceded by Abraham Lincoln Freedman	Judge of the United States District Court for the Eastern District of Pennsylvania; 1966–1990	Succeeded by William H. Yohn Jr.
Preceded by Alfred Leopold Luongo	Chief Judge of the United States District Court for the Eastern District of Pennsylvania; 1986–1990	Succeeded by Louis Bechtle
