= Endo Pharmaceuticals Building =

Historic industrial building in New York, United States

Coordinates: 40.7356°N 73.5912°W

The building in 1967

The Endo Pharmaceuticals Building, also known as "Endo Laboratories", is a pharmaceutical plant designed by architect Paul Rudolph in 1962 in Garden City, New York, in the receding farmlands of Long Island. The "castle-like structure" was built to house the Endo Pharmaceuticals research, manufacturing and administration facilities. It still stands today as an example of post World War II American architecture in the Brutalist style.

== History ==
The construction of the Endo Laboratories building began in 1962, and was completed in 1964. At the time, the fortress–like appearance of this building was the cause of great controversy in local government of Garden City and public opinion. The Long Island State Parks Commission was even accused of trying to conceal it. Despite all this debate, architects from all over the world looked at this building and a 1964 article in The New York Times hailed it as one of the best commercial buildings in the New York Area.

Originally known as Endo Chemicals, Endo Pharmaceuticals Inc. was founded by the five Ushkow brothers in 1920. The family owned business grew and was in the business of manufacturing such well known medications as Percocet and Acetaminophen. Paul Rudolph received the Endo pharmaceuticals commission as a result of his widely popularized success with the Yale School of architecture. The marketing benefits of hiring a well known architect and using an iconic building to establish a corporate identity was not something that was lost on Joseph Ushkow and the executive staff of Endo Pharmaceuticals. They were very pleased with Rudolph’s design and seem to be quite confident of its architectural significance.

Once construction was complete in 1964, the company relocated from its 102,000-square-foot (9,500 m^{2}) facility in Richmond Hill, Queens to its state-of-the-art facility located in Garden City, Long Island. Later that year, the Concrete Industry Board awarded it the "conventional honor" of "Concrete Building of the year" on Nov. 16, 1964.

In 1969, Endo Pharmaceuticals was acquired by DuPont and the family-run business became a wholly owned subsidiary of DuPont but still under the name of Endo Pharmaceuticals until 1984. In 1997, DuPont sold certain pharmaceutical products, related rights, and assets and the new owners started business again under the Endo name.

Metropolitan Reality Associated LLC bought the deteriorating Endo Pharmaceuticals building in 2005, and completed an award-winning renovation in 2007. Unlike some of Paul Rudolph's works struggling for existence, his creation at 1000 Endo Boulevard is now fully occupied with new clients and houses the headquarters for Lifetime Brands.

== Architect ==
Paul Rudolph is recognized as one of the preeminent American modernists after World War II, yet he was not a mere torch-bearer of the European modernist movement. Ironically, despite fond memories of his instructor at Harvard Walter Gropius, Rudolph was not very fond of all glass buildings, the curtain wall, or box like architecture that was so indicative of the influences of the German émigré modernist architects on postwar American architecture. During the mid-fifties when the so-called "International Style" buildings were dotting the architectural landscape of America, Rudolph resisted this application.

For him, such an approach to architecture addressed the needs of functionality but failed to satisfy the senses. Rudolph’s work seemed much more influenced by the work of Le Corbusier and Frank Lloyd Wright than anyone else. Rudolph was fascinated by the "New Brutalism", especially Chandigarh; there are many elements in his buildings that can be traced back to the moves that Le Corbusier’s used at Chandigarh. Rudolph felt that in time people would regard it as highly as the Piazza San Marco in Venice, Italy. He was very taken by how the forms expressed in Chandigarh opposed the natural shapes of the surrounding landscape. He wrote, "In every way it opposes the mountains; the angled stair way, the ramp on the roof; . . . all these angles are obviously and carefully conceived to oppose the receding angles of the land masses."

This way of directing the eye is a key sensual strategy adopted from Le Corbusier; it is clearly visible in the strong verticality created by the cylinders undulating on the exterior of the Endo Pharmaceuticals building.

While glass curtain wall buildings were being erected all over Long Island, Rudolph designed the fortress like structure as an antithesis to beliefs of the strand of modernists influenced by German modern architecture. Rudolph’s work always had a tendency to polarize those that had any opinion about his work. While the owners of Endo Pharmaceuticals cherished their new building as art, many in Long Island considered it tough to even look at.

== Site and context ==
Long Island is a part of New York State; it is divided into two suburban counties: Nassau and Suffolk (its other two counties, Kings and Queens, are part of New York City). Garden City is a subdivision of Nassau County roughly 30 miles (48 km) east of Manhattan. At one time, Long Island consisted of mostly farmland and large open green space. After World War II and into the 1950s, development had significantly changed the landscape; family farms and green settings were disappearing all across Long Island. By the early 1960s, as schools and highway infrastructure improved, Long Island came to be known as the "suburbs" of New York City.

All of these regional economic changes made building a very large processing plant an attractive option for Endo Pharmaceuticals. The final plan designed by Paul Rudolph proposed a 150,000-square-foot (14,000 m^{2}) plant on an eight-acre site. The "castle-like" pharmaceutical plant is perched strategically on a bluff overlooking a curve on the Meadowbrook Parkway; this siting gives any driver traveling north a continuous view of the north and west facades of this concrete monolith rising above the Long Island countryside.

By the time construction had started, the once bucolic setting of Long Island was really no more, despite the fact that development had slowed down for quite some time. The local municipalities and state government had to reconsider their zoning ordinances on how vacant land should be used in an effort to protect "open space, vistas, setbacks and simple beauty". This was the only option they had left to preserve the remaining quasi-natural settings of Long Island.

Naturally, the reaction from local residents and local government toward the Endo Pharmaceuticals building was not positive. Its appearance was in stark contrast to the natural landscape, the expected corporate modernism, and the nostalgia of Long Island Past. This was the "controversy" that Ada Louise Huxtable referred to in her 1964 article in The New York Times and the subject of Ronald Maiorana’s 1964 New York Times article. This is a quote describing the incident.

"Joseph Ushkow President of Endo Pharmaceuticals "promised to holler like hell" because the Long Island State park commission was planting trees along the Meadowbrook Parkway to hide his multimillion-dollar plant from motorists."

This was only 9 of the 20-to-25-foot-tall (6.1 to 7.6 m) evergreens that were relocated in front of the Endo building on the parkway and an additional 64 trees were being planned for relocation to that area. Officially, Mr. Blakelock executive secretary of the Parks commission said that "no attempt was being made to obstruct the view of the plant". Ronald Maiorana’s article keenly points out that "Workmen along parkway called the new building an "eyesore" and added 'were trying to hide this thing from people on the parkway.'"

== Form and use ==
The Endo Pharmaceuticals building can be described as a mat-building due to its shallow profile and wide plan on the landscape. Four of Le Corbusier’s five points of Architecture are observed in Rudolph’s design decisions, free facade, open plan, one continuous ribbon window and a roof garden. The most memorable and maybe the most hated feature are the corrugated cylinders that appear to rhythmically undulate on the exterior of this building. The cylinders which have been referred to as "turrets" sequentially interrupt the ribbon window and are hollow, with only a translucent material capping the tops to allow light to radiate in from above. Some of the larger cylinders hide stairwells and other functionality to push the utility features to the exterior of the building and open up the floor plan. The rounded half cylinder of the cafeteria rises up and looks out on to the roof garden creating a pleasant outdoor space for employees and "the raised round platforms are exercise runs for experimental animals." All of these functional elements also add to the buildings sculpted look on its exterior and roofline. On the inside, most pharmaceutical manufacturing follows a horizontal process. In this building, the flow utilizes gravity and the manufacturing process flows form the upper floors to the packaging area down below. The machine age aesthetic developed by Le Corbusier is legible in many of the design choices of Rudolph’s Endo pharmaceuticals building.

== Method of construction ==
The construction of the Endo Pharmaceutical Building began in 1962, completed by Walter Kiddie Constructors in 1964, at a cost of about $23 per square foot. The total cost, $5 million, was a bargain even by the standards of the day. This 160,000-square-foot (15,000 m^{2}) factory and administration complex rises three stories up from a poured concrete foundation that supports a structural steel frame wrapped by an envelope of concrete, stone and masonry. Henry Pfisterer, the chief structural engineer, worked with Rudolph along with specialists in pharmaceutical production planning.

The infamous corduroy concrete surface—a signature on Rudolph’s buildings, and used at Endo as well—was developed by the architect for the Yale school of Architecture. Rudolph’s firm designed specially made plywood fins were nailed to the inside of the concrete formwork. Once the concrete had cured and formwork removed, the fins and the aggregate were chipped off with a hammer that revealed the rough surface of the aggregate. This technique apparently hides the normal discoloration that takes place with concrete that is formed with standard formwork; although, it is consistently used as a surface texture on the exterior and interior of the Yale building. The Endo Pharmaceuticals building used the same exposed aggregate technique on the exterior of the building, but unlike Yale, it used it on the curved surfaces as well, an indication that the technique had been improved by that time. This rough surface texture was only applied to specific areas on the interior of the Endo building, and unlike Yale, where it was applied almost everywhere on the inside.

== Significance ==
Ada Louise Huxtable wrote the following, "The Structure's most solid achievement is that it does a first-rate job of translating an extraordinary set of technical requirements into a distinguished and important work of architecture." By the time the Endo Pharmaceuticals building was conceived, the principles established by Le Corbusier and the German modernists had been published, applied and even taught for decades. Yet only the most economically applicable principles seem to have permeated into the design of industrial architecture. This has led to the misguided idea of the ubiquitous box being the proper form for buildings that house productivity. Long Island was littered with these box-like commercial buildings of brick, glass and steel; you don’t need a passionate architect like Paul Rudolph to create such buildings. The reason why architects from around the world were coming to see this building was because Rudolph addressed the production needs of his patron with a bold architectural gesture, that was not only affordable, but also an undeniable challenge to complacency. The Endo Pharmaceuticals building stands as an important example of post World War II industrial architecture and one of the few remaining Brutalist buildings in the State of New York and Long Island.

== Bibliography ==
- Gans, Deborah (2006). The Le Corbusier guide. Princeton Architectural Press. ISBN 1-56898-539-8.
- American Institute of Architects, Society for the Preservation of Long Island Antiquities (1996). AIA architectural guide to Nassau and Suffolk counties, Long Island. Dover Publications. ISBN 0-486-26946-9.
