= Paul Rudolph (architect) =

American architect (1918–1997)

- Born: October 23, 1918; Elkton, Kentucky, US
- Died: August 8, 1997 (aged 78); New York City, US
- Education: Auburn University; Harvard Graduate School of Design
- Occupation: Architect
- Buildings: Yale Art and Architecture Building

Paul Marvin Rudolph (October 23, 1918 – August 8, 1997) was an American architect and the chair of Yale University's Department of Architecture from 1958 to 1965. He was known for his use of reinforced concrete and highly complex floor plans. His best-known works include the Boston Government Service Center and the Yale Art and Architecture Building (A&A Building), a spatially-complex Brutalist concrete structure. He is one of the modernist architects considered an early practitioner of the Sarasota School of Architecture.

== Early life, education, and personal life ==
Paul Marvin Rudolph was born October 23, 1918, in Elkton, Kentucky. His father, Keener L. Rudolph, was an itinerant Methodist preacher, and through their travels the son was exposed to the architecture of the American South. His mother, Eurye (Stone) Rudolph, had artistic interests. Rudolph also showed early talent at painting and music.

Rudolph earned his bachelor's degree in architecture at Auburn University (then known as Alabama Polytechnic Institute) in 1940, and then moved to the Harvard Graduate School of Design to study with Bauhaus founder Walter Gropius. After three years, he left to serve as an officer in the United States Naval Reserve at Brooklyn Navy Yard for three years during WWII, working on design and construction of merchant marine ships. He then resumed studies at Harvard, where his classmates included I.M. Pei and Philip Johnson. Rudolph was awarded his master's degree in 1947.

Paul Rudolph was gay, though not openly, due to the political and societal climate of the time. He lived in his 23 Beekman Place apartment with his partner, Ernst Wagner.

== Work ==
=== Sarasota, Florida ===
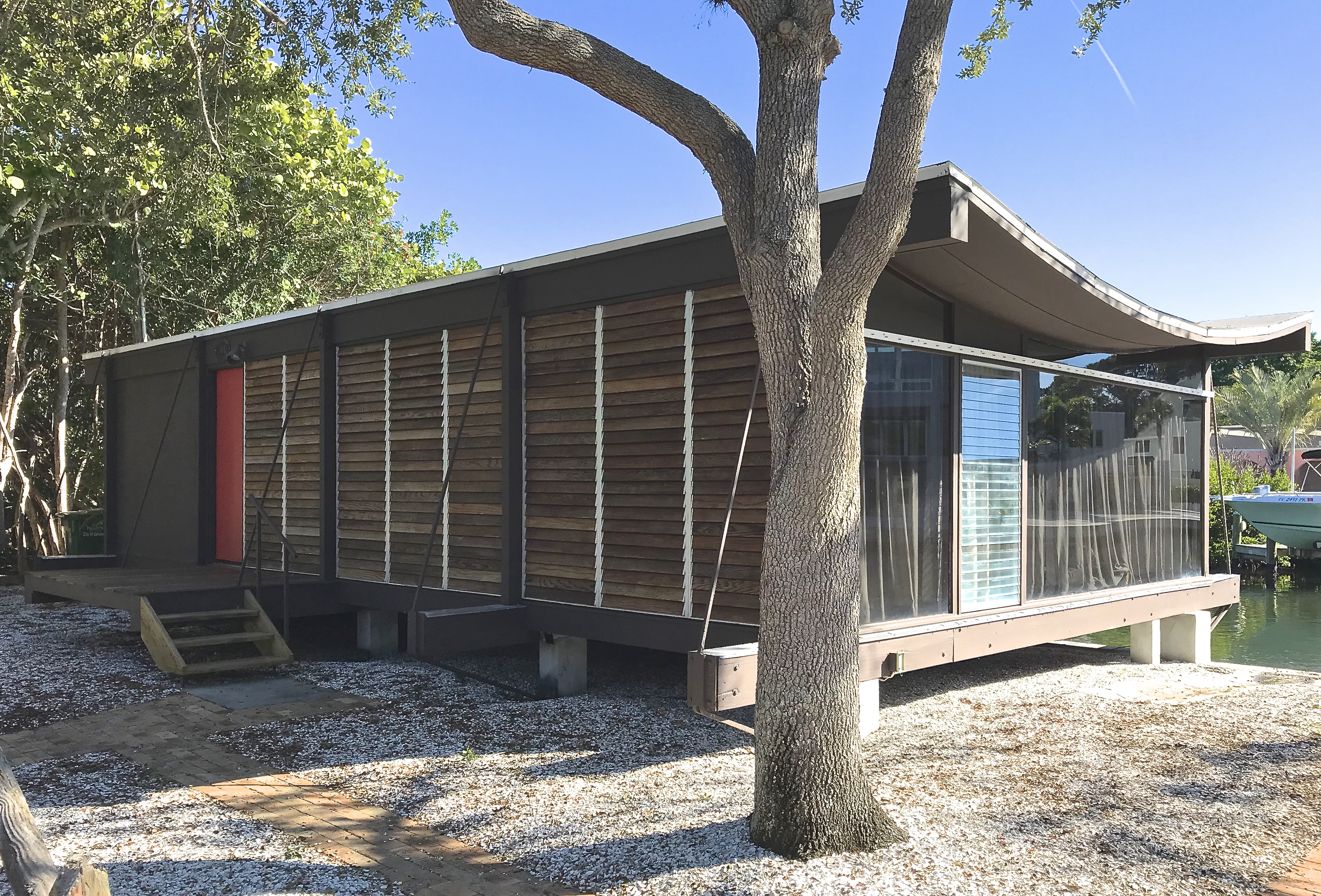
Healy Guest House (Ralph Twitchell and Paul Rudolph, Architects), 1950

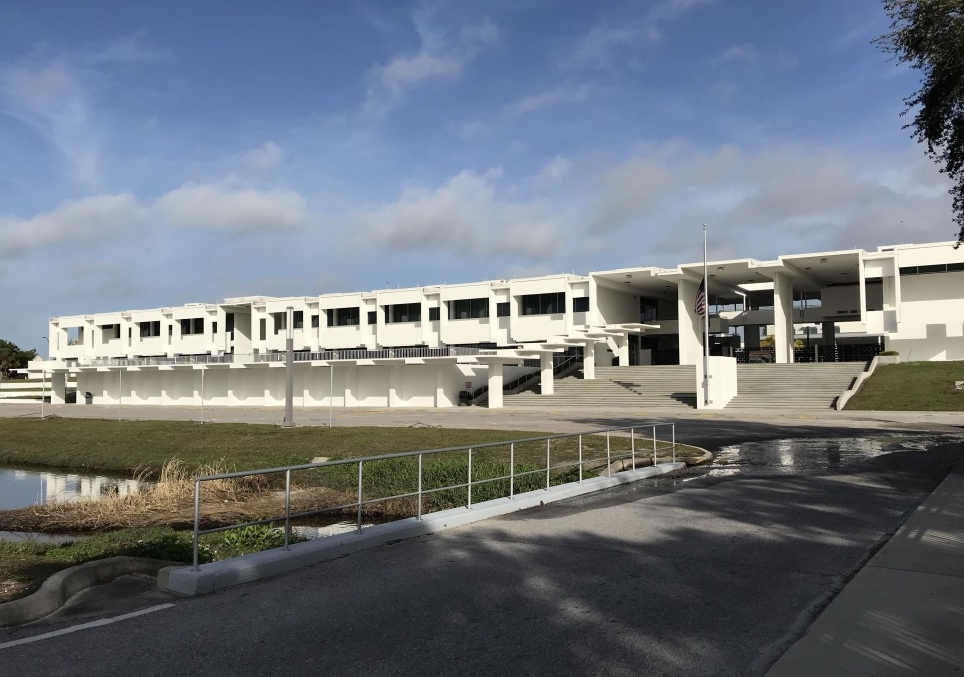
Sarasota High School Addition (1960)

Following his studies at Harvard, Rudolph moved to Sarasota, Florida, and partnered with Ralph Twitchell for four years, until he started his own practice in 1952. Rudolph's Sarasota time is now part of the period labeled Sarasota School of Architecture in his career.

Notable for its appearance in the 1958 book Masters of Modern Architecture, the W. R. Healy Guest House – nicknamed "The Cocoon House" – was a one-story guest house built in 1950 on Siesta Key, Sarasota, Florida. The roof was concave and was constructed using a built-up spray-on process that Rudolph had seen used to cocoon disused ships during his time in the US Navy (hence, the house's nickname). In addition, Rudolph used jalousie windows, which enabled the characteristic breezes to and from Sarasota Bay to flow through the house.

His first independent work, post Twitchell, was the Walker Guest House, a sparse exoskeleton structure built in the sand dunes and scrub of Sanibel Island in 1953. It was Rudolph's most clearly articulated and rigorously geometric residential project in Florida. Rudolph considered the guesthouse to be one of his favorite projects, exhibiting pure architectural ideals suited to its environment.

Other Sarasota landmarks by Rudolph include the Riverview High School, built in 1957 as his first large-scale project. In 2006, there was a great deal of controversy in Sarasota when many members of the community appealed for the retention of the historic building after the decision reached by the county school board to demolish the structure. As Charles Gwathmey, the architect overseeing renovation of Art and Architecture Building at Yale, said: "Riverview High School is a fantastic prototype of what today we call green architecture. He was so far ahead of his time, experimenting with sun screens and cross-ventilation. If it's torn down, I feel badly for architecture." However, in June 2009, Riverview High School was demolished.

Another school building design in Sarasota was Rudolph's 1960 addition to Sarasota High School, a concrete structure that utilized large overhanging sunshades and "internal" yet outside corridors with natural ventilation. This building, along with a gymnasium structure built at the same time, has recently undergone a renovation by the Sarasota County School Board that reinstated the building's original exterior appearance, but contains a completely new interior layout. A portion of the original architecture has been incorporated into the adjacent Sarasota Art Museum.

=== Yale and Brutalism ===
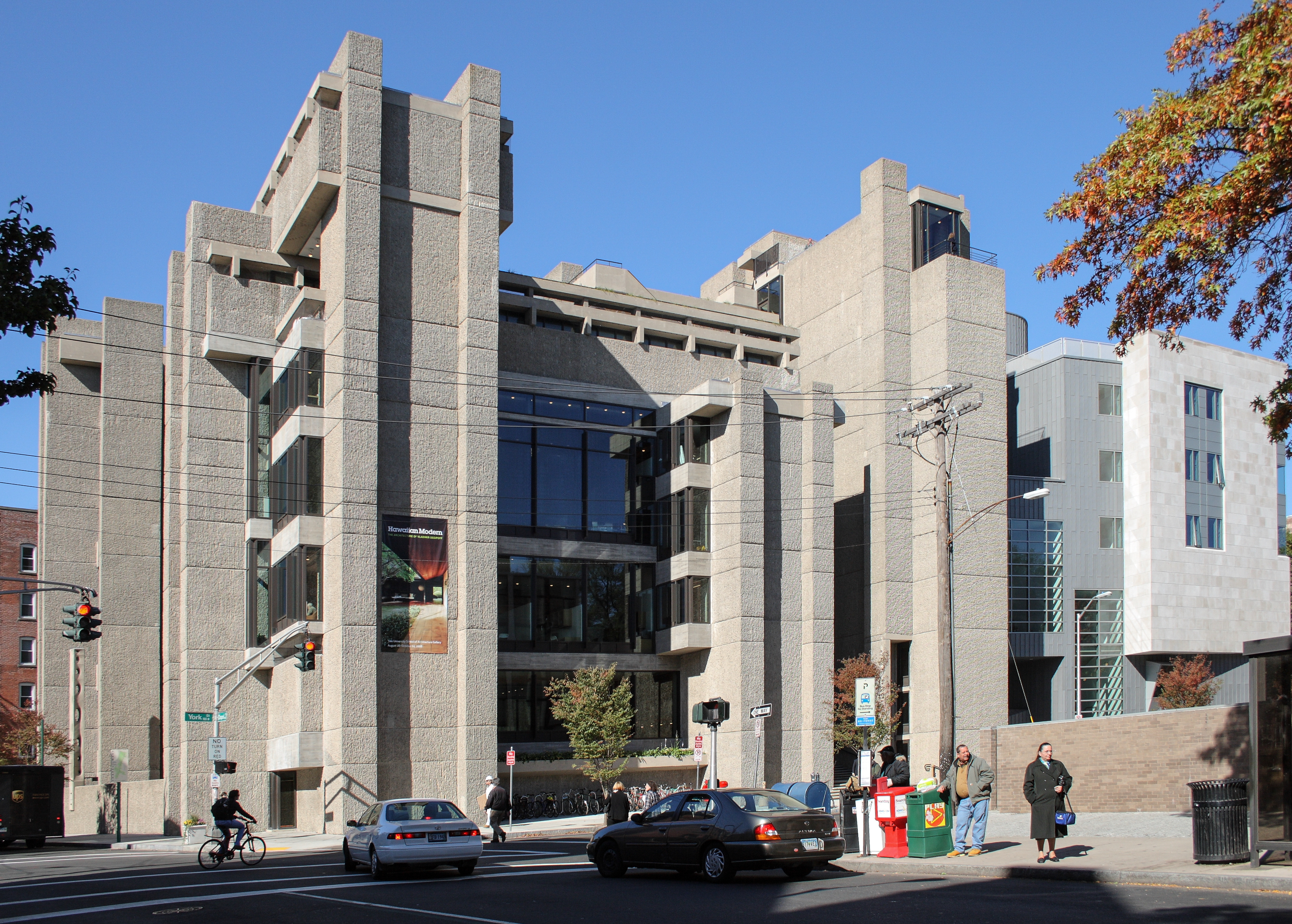
Yale Art & Architecture Building (1963)

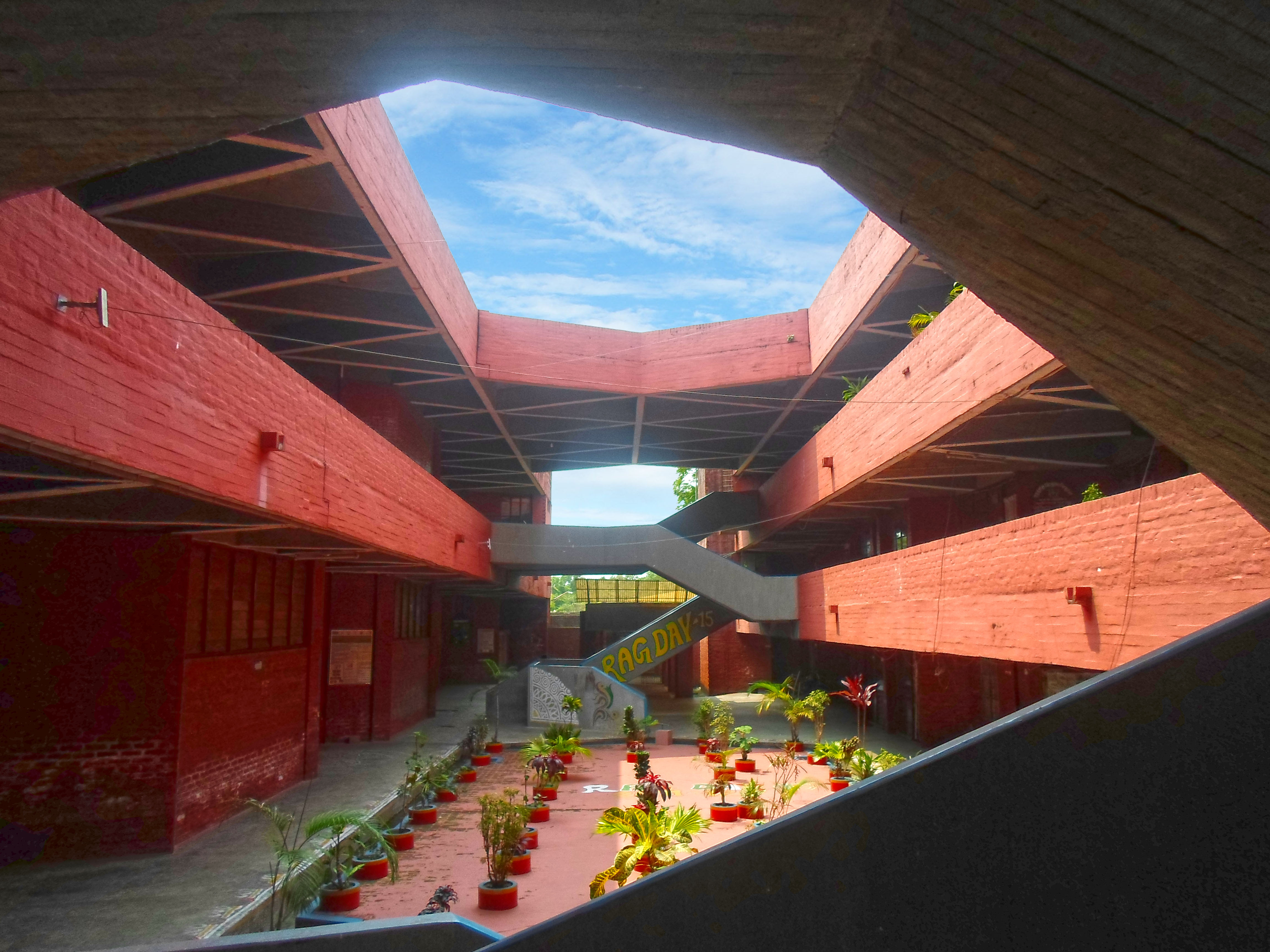
Courtyard of Animal Husbandry faculty, Bangladesh Agricultural University (BAU)

While chair of the Department of Architecture at Yale, Rudolph taught Muzharul Islam, Norman Foster, and Richard Rogers, all attending the Master's course as scholarship students. Foster in particular has noted the significant influence that Rudolph had upon him. Rudolph was invited to Bangladesh by Muzharul Islam and designed Bangladesh Agricultural University. He worked on the Milam Residence, which was designed and constructed between 1959 and 1961.

In the late 1950s, Paul Rudolph's Florida houses began to attract attention outside of the architectural community and he started receiving commissions for larger works such as the Jewett Arts Center (1955) at Wellesley College and the Blue Cross Building (1956) in Boston. He then took the chairmanship of the Yale Department of Architecture in 1958, shortly after designing the Yale Art & Architecture Building. Rudolph stayed at Yale for six years until he returned to private practice. He designed the Temple Street Parking Garage, also in New Haven, in 1961. When Rudolph started working independently he become an icon in European Modernism. Architectural Record named it House of the Year in 1963, and it's considered a pivotal work in Rudolph's career.

In 1958, Rudolph was commissioned to create a master plan for Tuskegee University in Tuskegee, Alabama. He later collaborated with graduates of Tuskegee's architecture school on the design of a new chapel building, completed in 1969. He also designed the Endo Pharmaceuticals Building in Garden City, New York (1964), the Dana Arts Center (1969) at Colgate University, the Boston Government Service Center (1971), First Church in Boston (1972), and the Burroughs Wellcome headquarters (1972, demolished 2021) in North Carolina.

Rudolph was the architect for the Oriental Masonic Garden project, 148 units on 12.5 acres in New Haven, Connecticut, built between 1968 and 1971. Residents were not happy with the plywood and prefab units; among other problems, they leaked. The units were demolished in 1981.

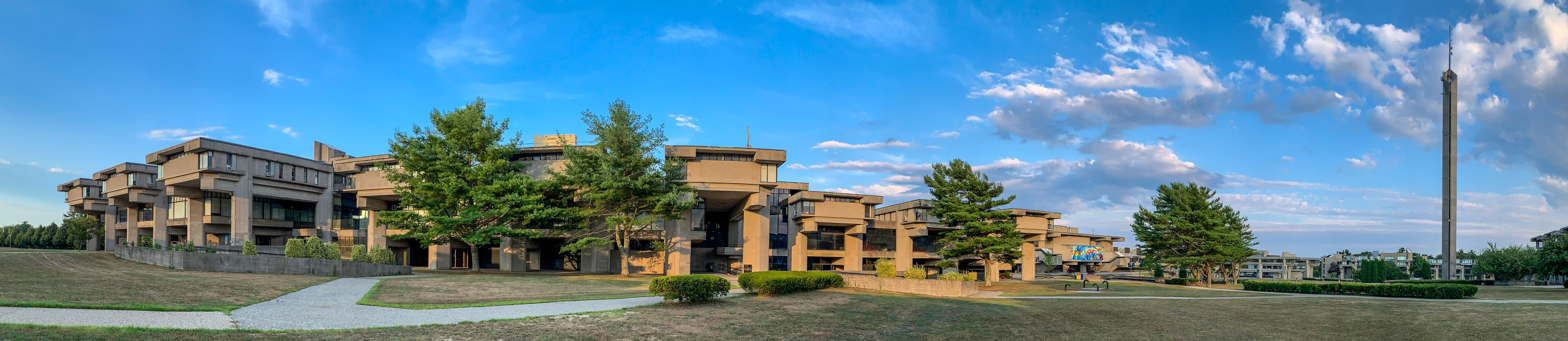
Panoramic view of the University of Massachusetts, Dartmouth, highlighting Rudolph's Brutalist designs (1963–1989). Karam Campanile at far right

The main campus of University of Massachusetts Dartmouth (originally known as Southeastern Massachusetts Technological Institute, and later as the Southeastern Massachusetts University) was a continuing focus of his work. His association started in 1963, and continued in various capacities through the 1980s. He personally designed several buildings, but his overall architectural vision guided the development of the entire campus for decades. His Shoreline apartments in Buffalo were completed in 1974 and were promoted as pioneering low-income housing designed as part of a larger masterplan for the city's waterfront. The masterplan was never completed.

=== Later years ===
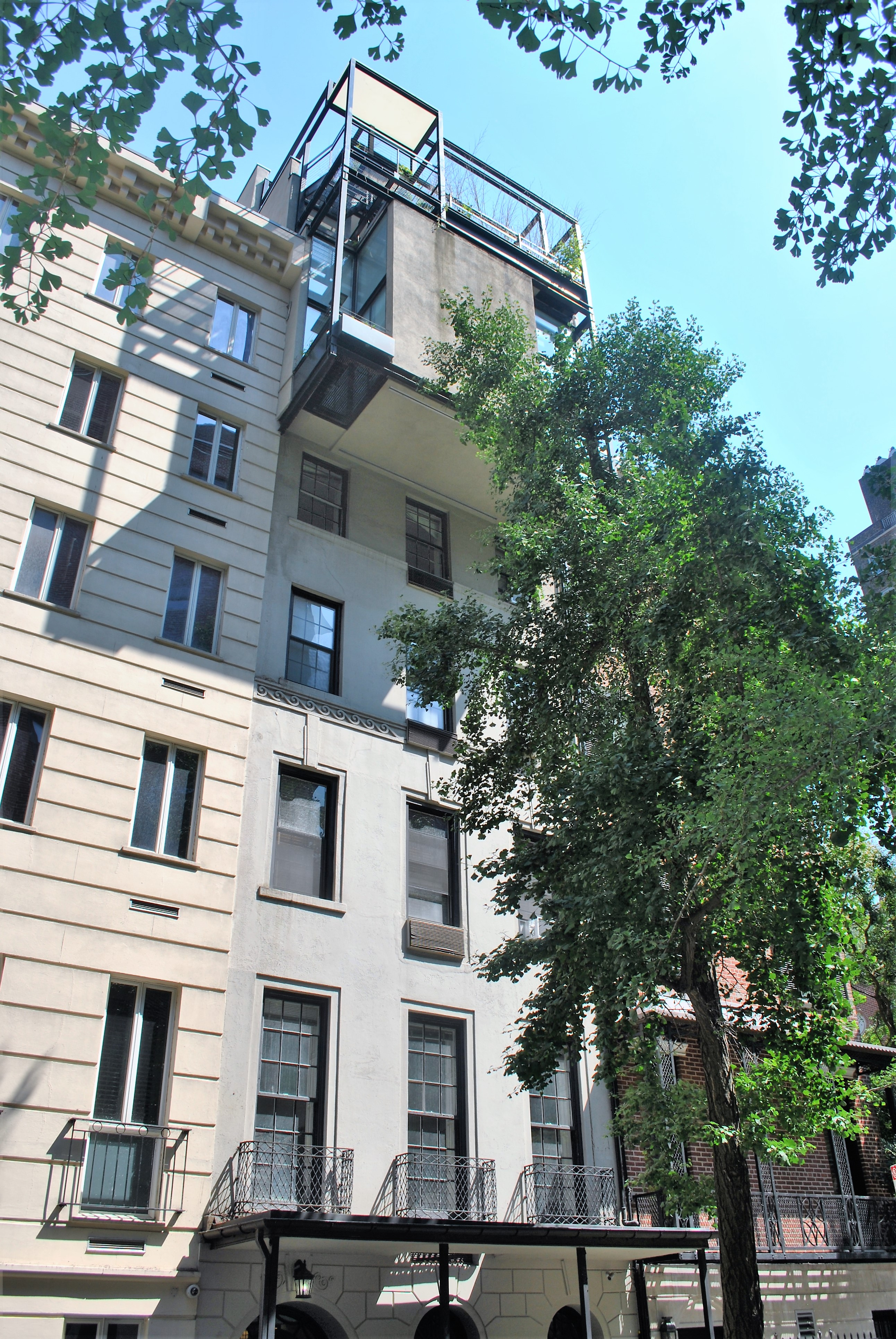
Rudolph's residence at 23 Beekman Place, modified 1977–82

Rudolph left Yale in 1965, and his career declined gradually during the 1970s. While the Brutalist style fell out of favor in the US during the 1970s, Rudolph's work evolved, and he became more successful with international projects.

In a departure from his monolithic concrete works, Rudolph designed reflective glass office towers such as the City Center Towers in Fort Worth, Texas. Rudolph continued working on projects in Singapore, where he designed The Concourse office tower with its ribbon windows and interweaving floors, as well as projects in other Asian countries through the last years of his life. The Lippo Centre, completed in 1987, is located near Admiralty station of MTR in Hong Kong, and is a culmination of Rudolph's ideas in reflective glass. In Indonesia, Rudolph-designed buildings can be found in Jakarta (Wisma Dharmala Sakti) and Surabaya (Wisma Dharmala Sakti 2).

His personal residence at 23 Beekman Place in the Midtown East neighborhood of Manhattan became internationally famous. Over the years, he built an idiosyncratic exterior addition, and modified the interior with multiple levels and his own flair for decoration and display of art.

== Death and legacy ==
Rudolph's last years were shadowed by cancer, which ravaged his body. He died on August 8, 1997, at the age of seventy-eight in New York City from peritoneal mesothelioma, a disease primarily associated with asbestos. It is believed that during his work at the Brooklyn Navy Yard during WWII, he and many other workers were exposed to high levels of asbestos contamination.

Paul Rudolph donated his personal archive, spanning his entire career, to the Library of Congress, as well as donating all intellectual property rights to the American people. His bequest also helped to establish the Center for Architecture, Design, and Engineering at the Library of Congress.

The Paul Rudolph Penthouse & Apartments (1977–82), at 23 Beekman Place in Manhattan, was designated a New York City Landmark in 2010.

The John and Alice Fullam House is an obscure commission designed in 1957, and built in 1959. It was never published in the Rudolph portfolio at the request of the owners, John and Alice Fullam. In 2004, when they were contemplating moving, the owners became concerned over preservation of the house, reading that many Rudolph buildings were being destroyed. In 2007, the residence was sold to preservationist owners who did a major restoration addressing many of the modern code issues. In 2017 the third bay of the structure, part of the original 1957 design, was completed.

In 1972's Learning from Las Vegas, Robert Venturi and Denise Scott Brown use Rudolph's Crawford Manor (1962) as an exemplar of "establishment architecture now", particularly to illustrate the tendency of high modernism to allow the program of a building to distort its form. They thus label Crawford Manor a duck, "heroic and original", while their Guild House (1963) is a decorated shed, "ugly and ordinary".

Rudolph was a partial inspiration for the character of László Tóth in Brady Corbet's film The Brutalist.

== Notable designs ==
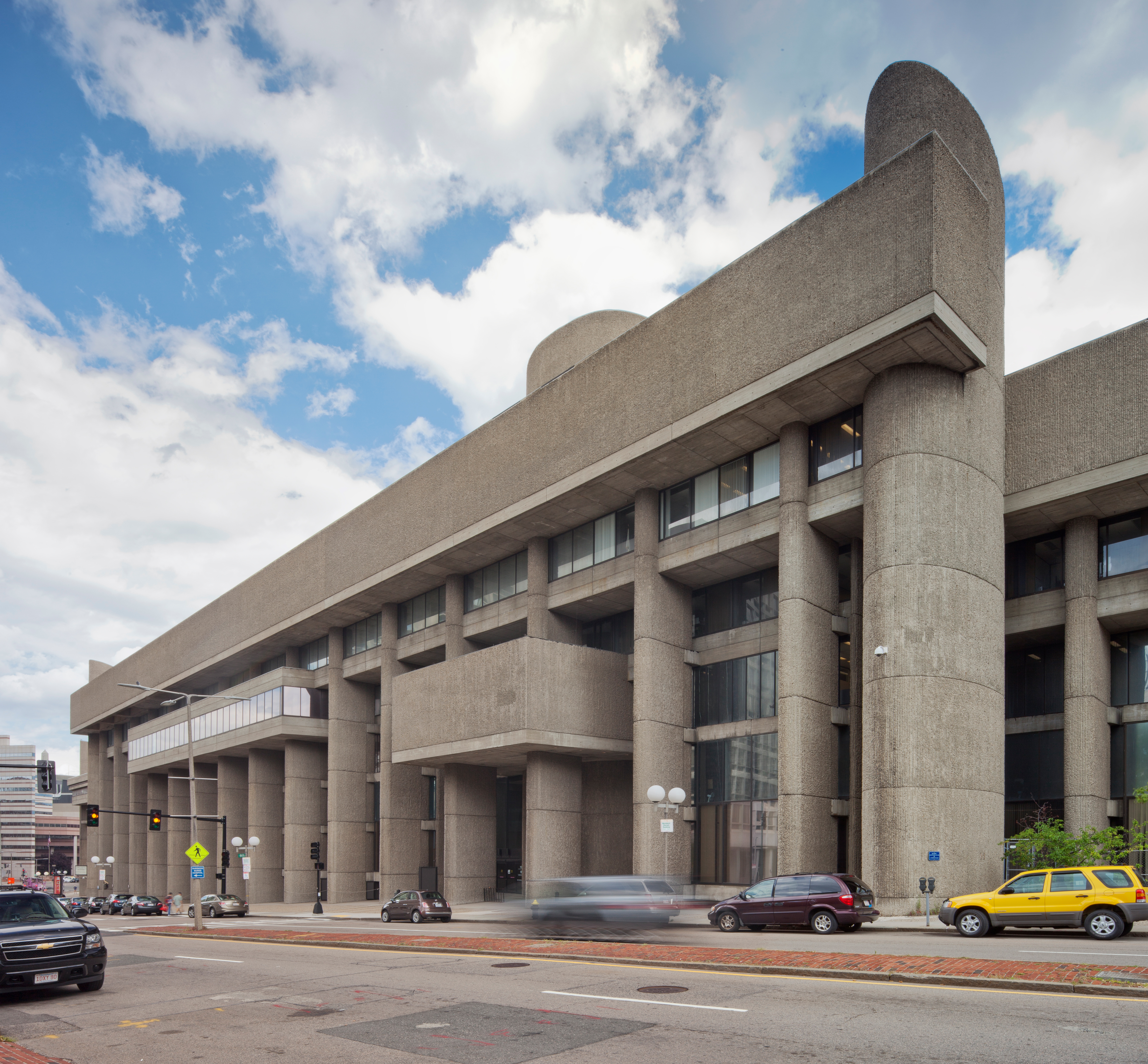
Boston Government Service Center (1971)

- Revere Quality House (1948)
- Healy Guest House (1950, as partner with Ralph Twitchell)
- Hiss Residence (1952)
- Sanderling Beach Club (1952)
- Walker Guest House (1953)
- Jewett Arts Center at Wellesley College (1955)
- Blue Cross-Blue Shield Headquarters in Boston (1956)
- John and Alice Fullam House (1957)
- Riverview High School (1957)
- Yale Art & Architecture Building (1958)
- Tuskegee Institute master plan (1958)
- Sarasota High School addition (1960)
- Lake Region Yacht & Country Club with Gene Leedy (1960)
- Milam Residence (1961)
- Boston Government Service Center (1962)
- Crawford Manor (1962)
- Endo Pharmaceuticals Building (1962)
- Orange County Government Center (1963)
- University of Massachusetts Dartmouth campus (1963-1980s)
- J. W. Chorley Elementary School (1964)
- Bass Residence (1966)
- Tuskegee University Chapel (1969)
- Dana Arts Center at Colgate University (1969)
- First Church in Boston (1972)
- Claire T. Carney Library (1972)
- Burroughs Wellcome headquarters (1972)
- Louis Micheels House (1972)
- Buffalo Waterfront Housing Project/Shoreline Apartments (1974)
- Tracey Towers (1972)
- Niagara Falls Public Library (1974)
- 23 Beekman Place renovations and penthouse (1977)
- William R. Cannon Chapel, Emory University (1977–82)
- City Center Towers Complex (1980s)
- The Concourse redesign (1987)
- Lippo Centre (1987)
- Modulightor Building (1989)
- Intiland Building in Surabaya (1997)

== Gallery ==
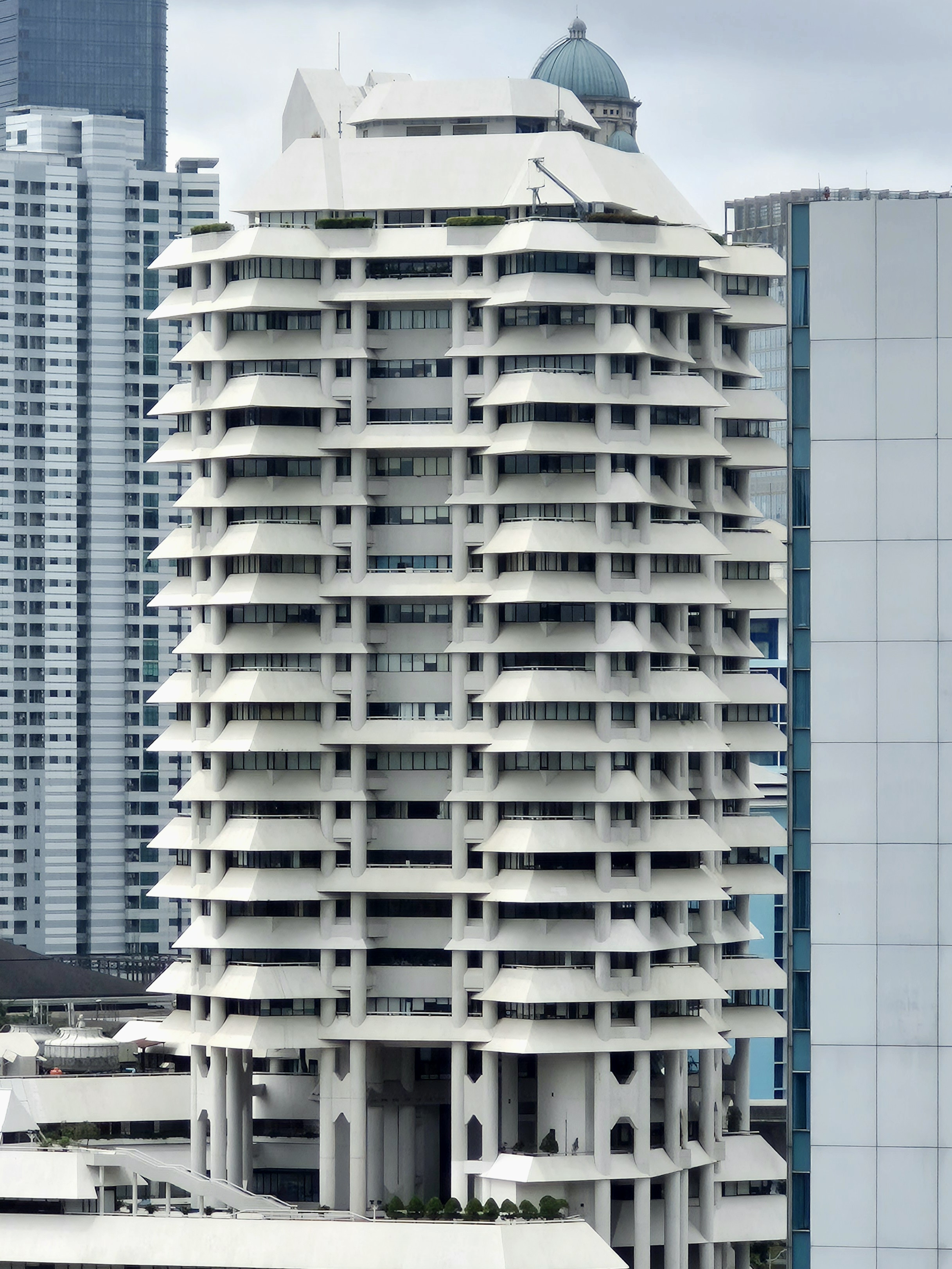
Intiland Tower (previously Wisma Dharmala Sakti), Jakarta

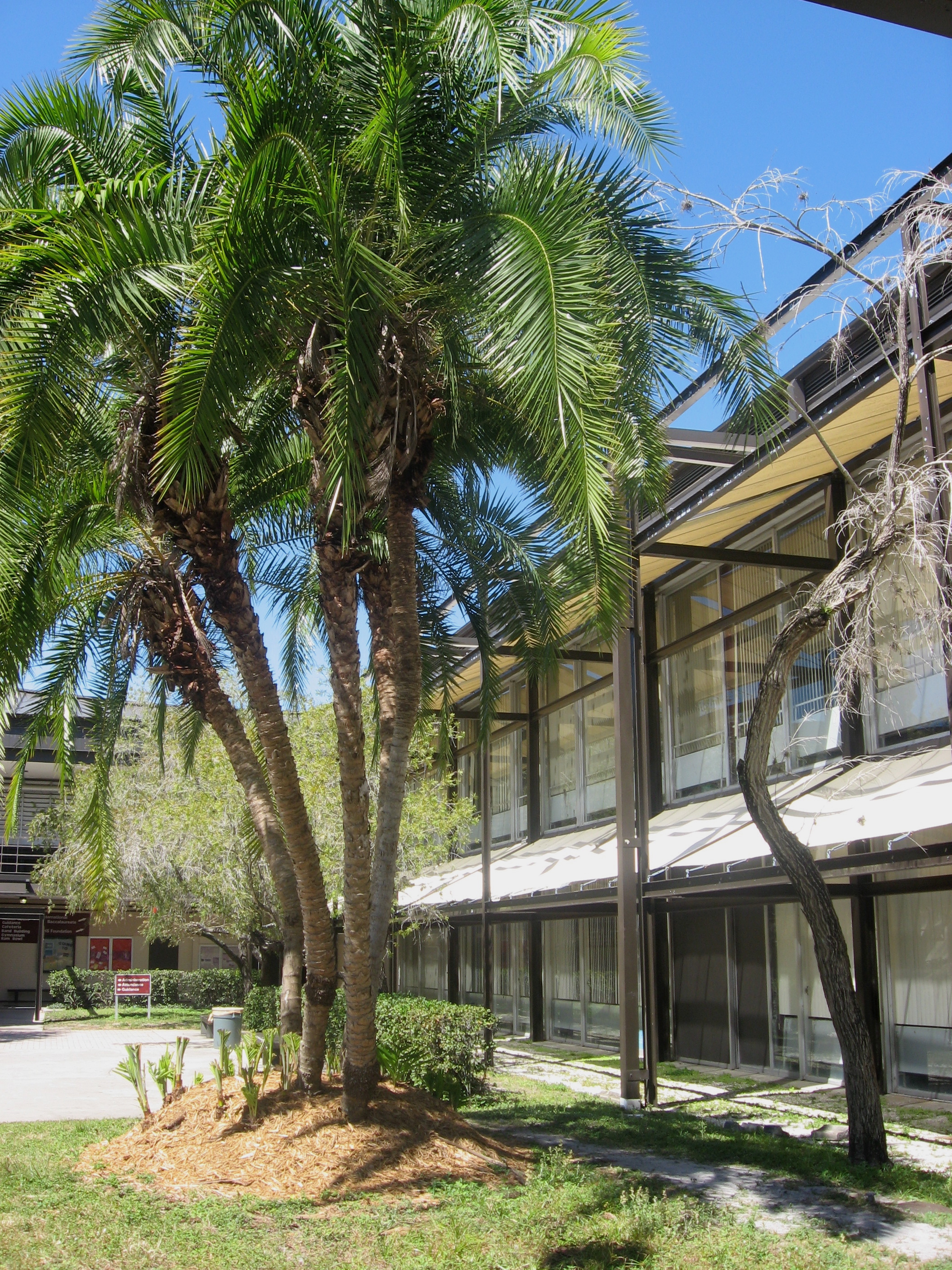
Riverview High School (1957–2009)

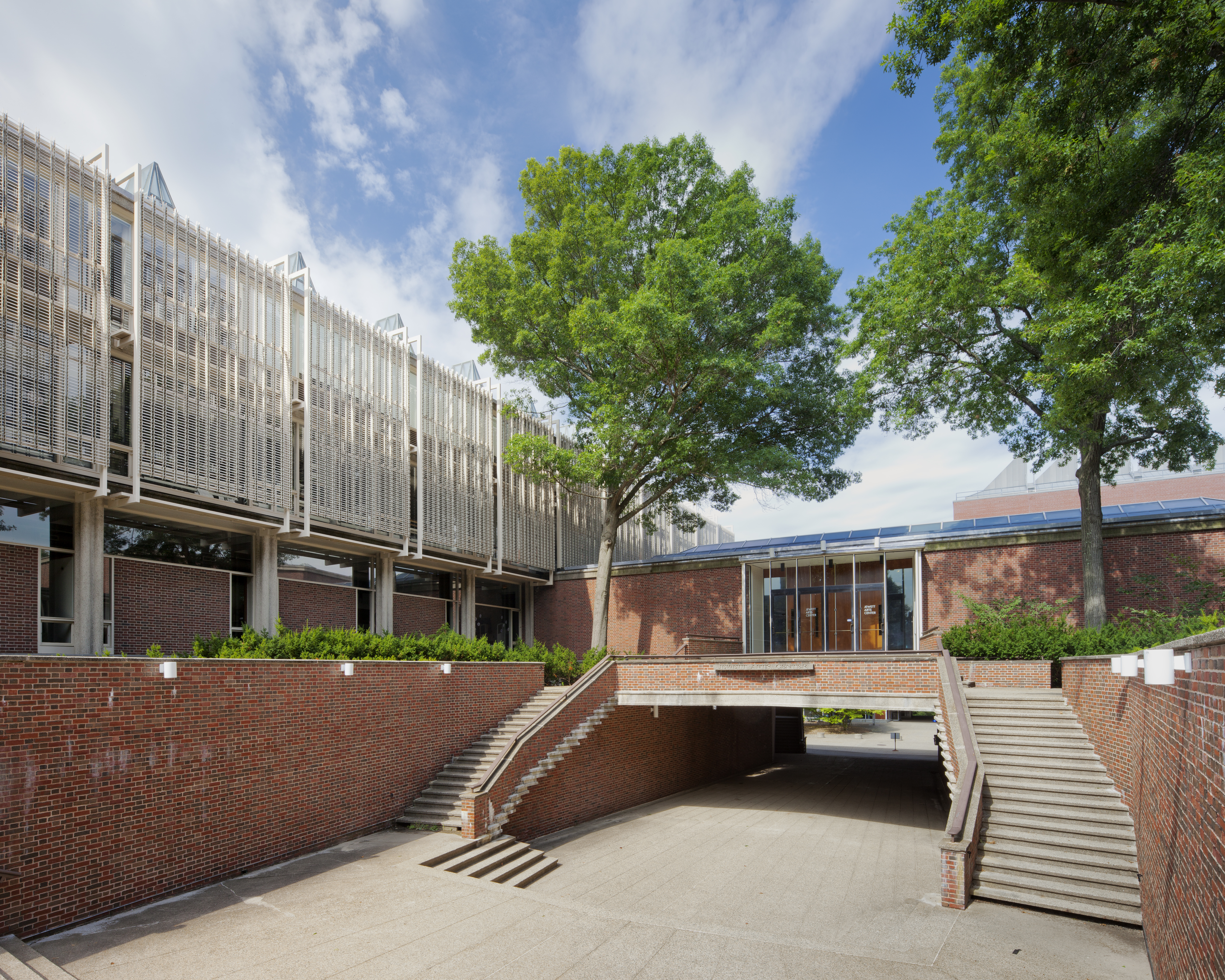
Jewett Arts Center (1958), Wellesley College

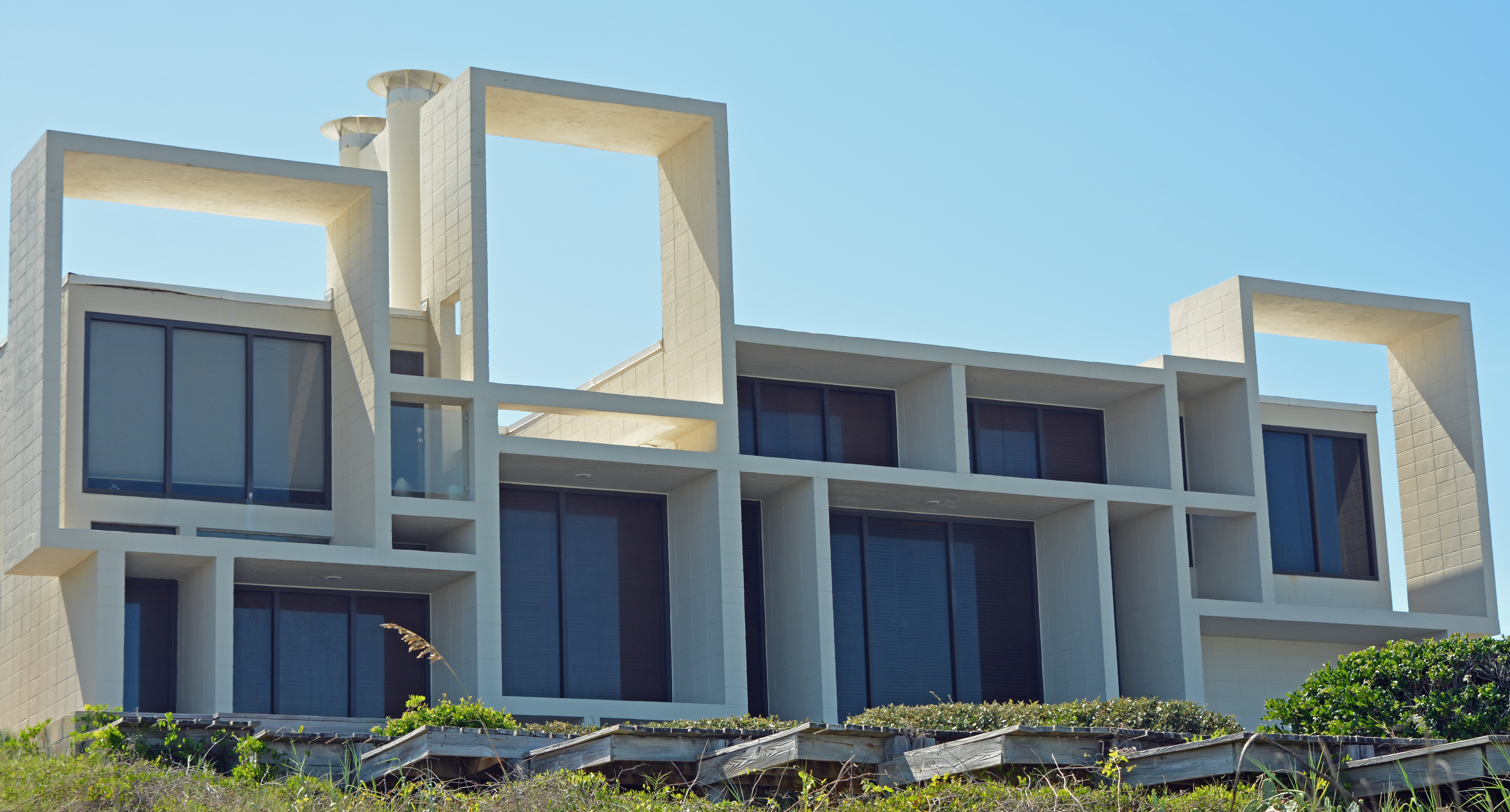
Milam Residence (1961)

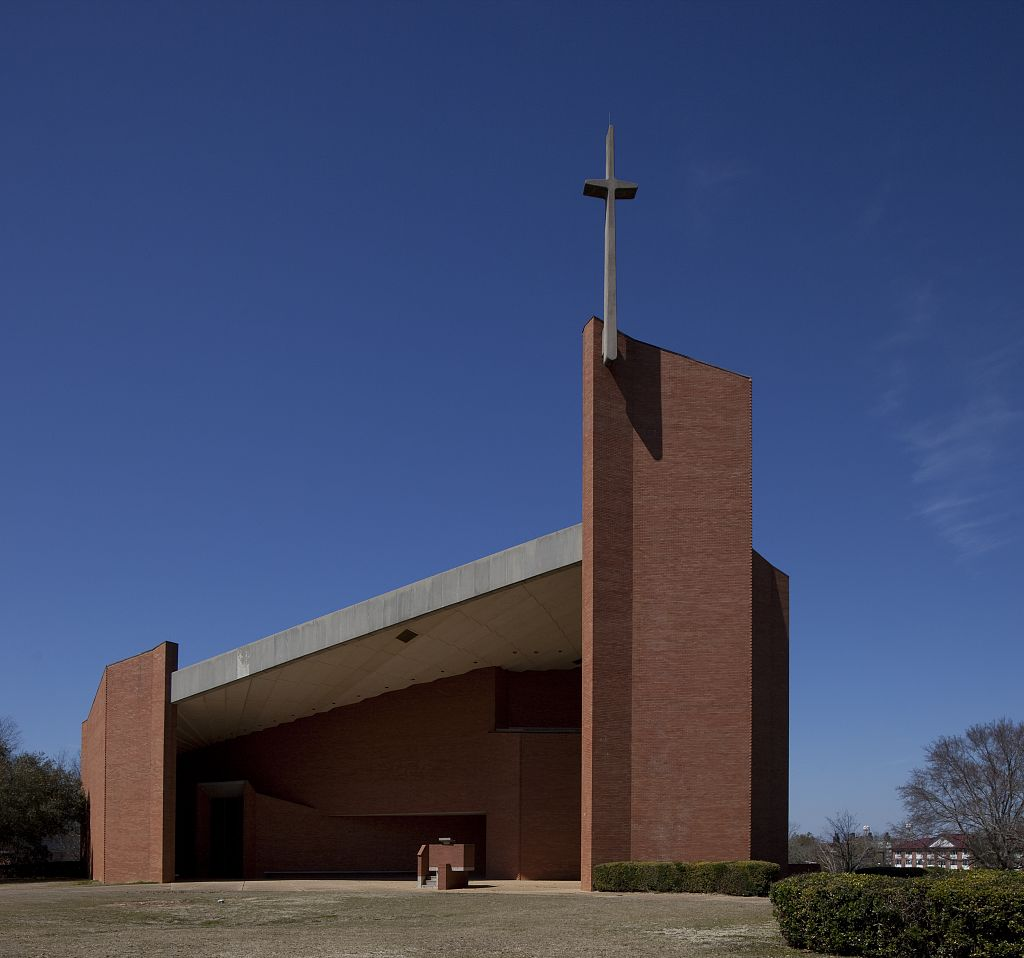
Tuskegee University Chapel (1969)

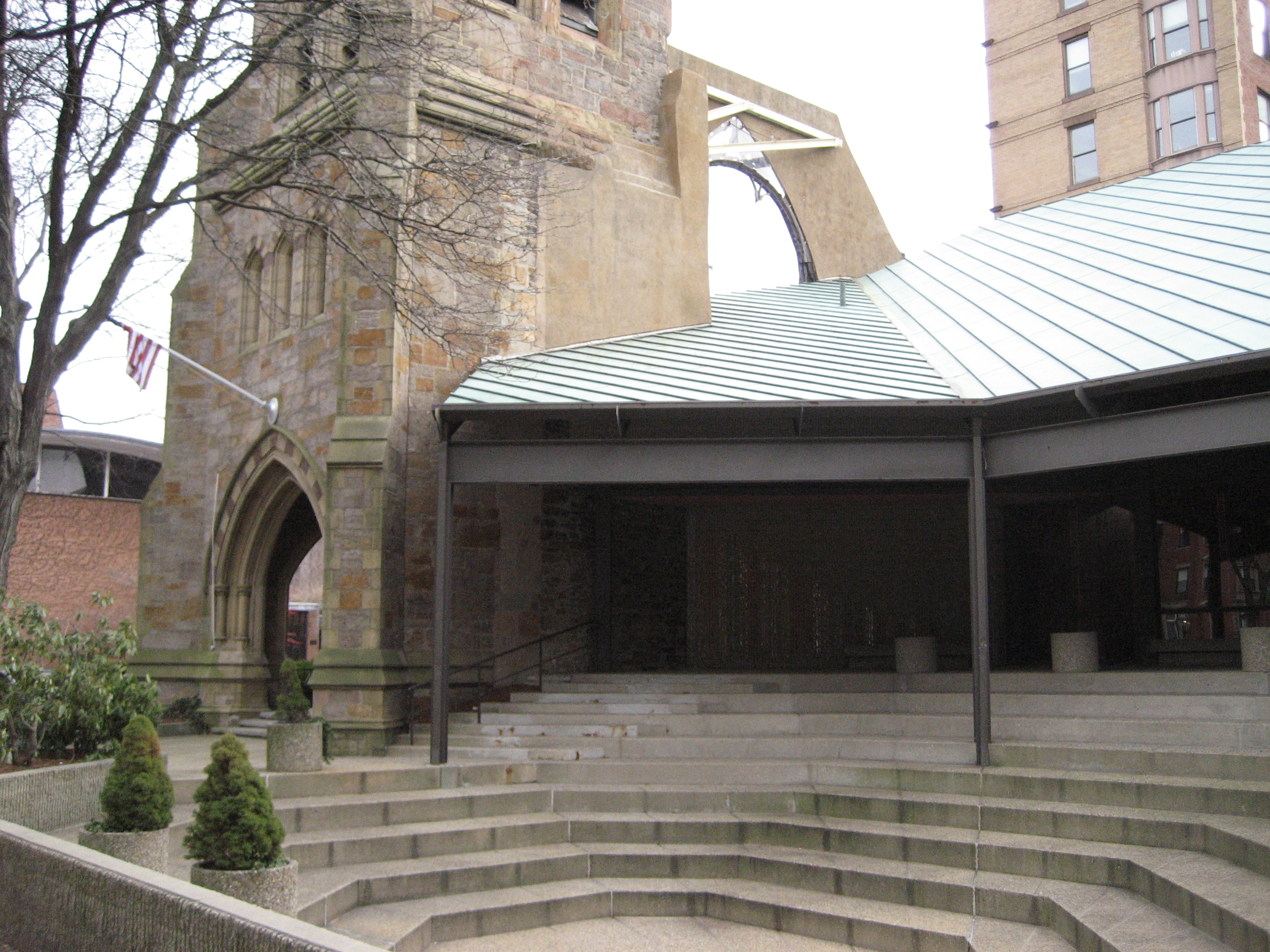
First Church in Boston (1972)

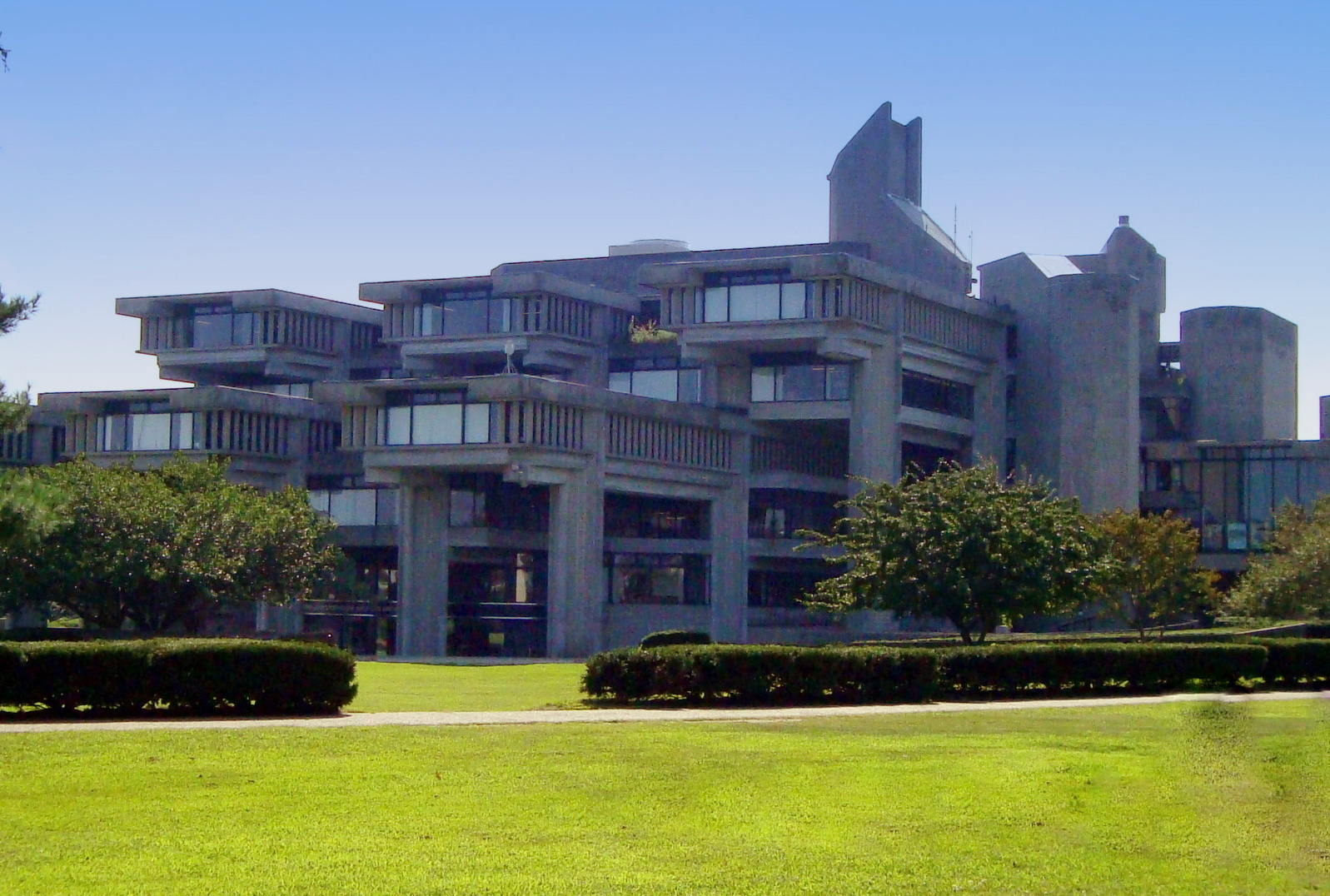
Claire T. Carney Library (1972)

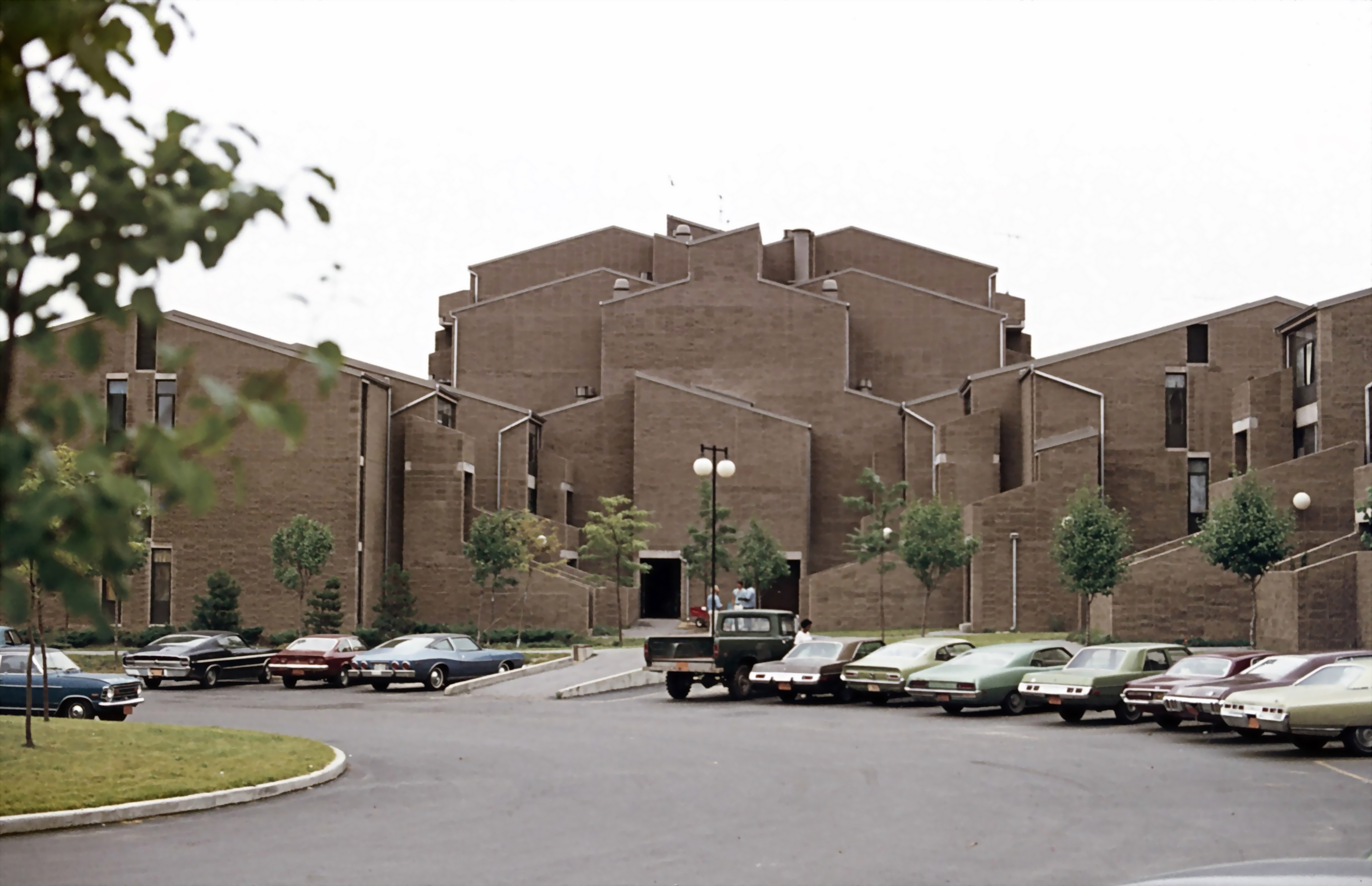
Buffalo Waterfront Housing Project/Shoreline Apartments (1969–1974), partially demolished (2015–2020)

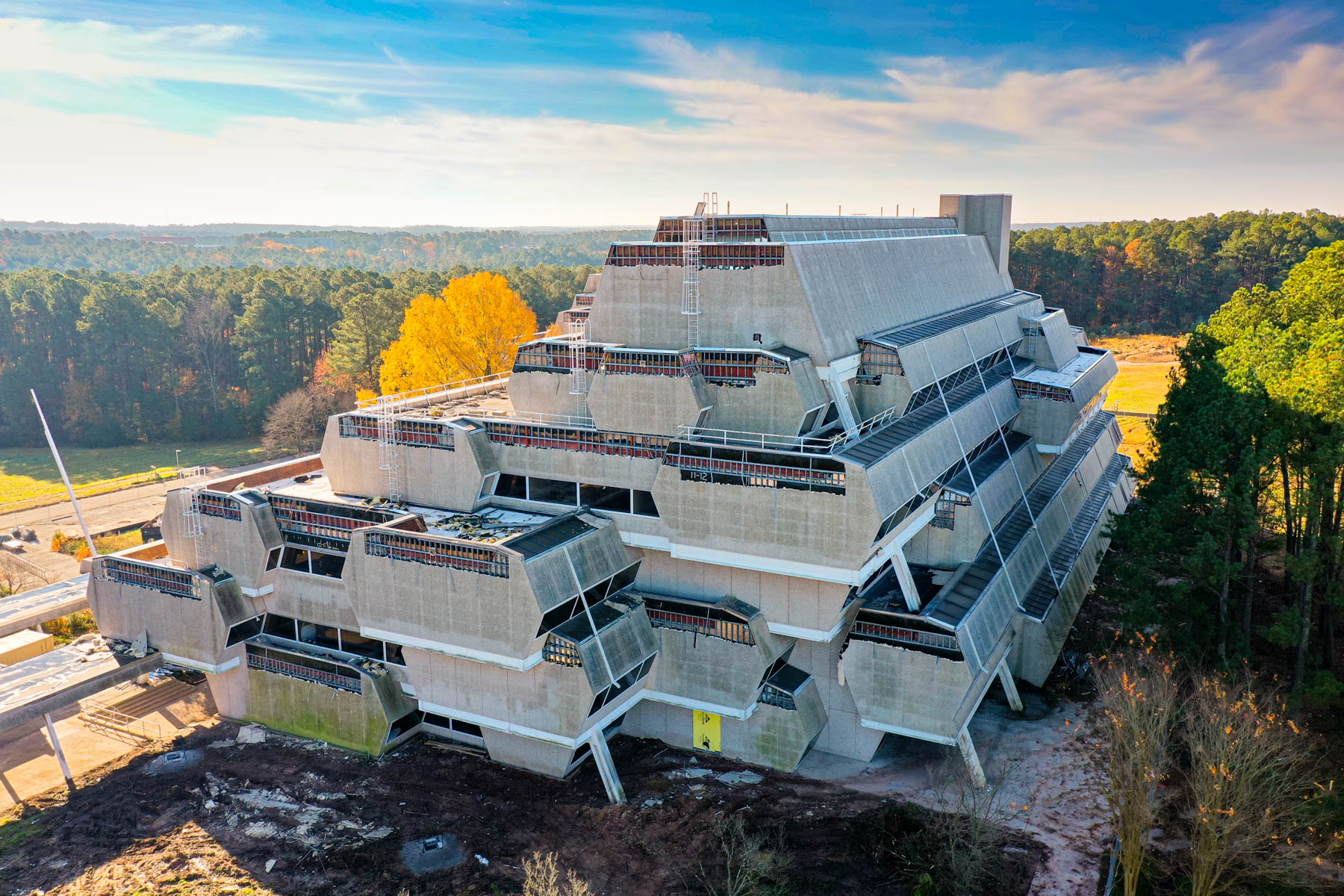
Burroughs Wellcome headquarters (1972–2021), Research Triangle Park, North Carolina

Early design for The Concourse

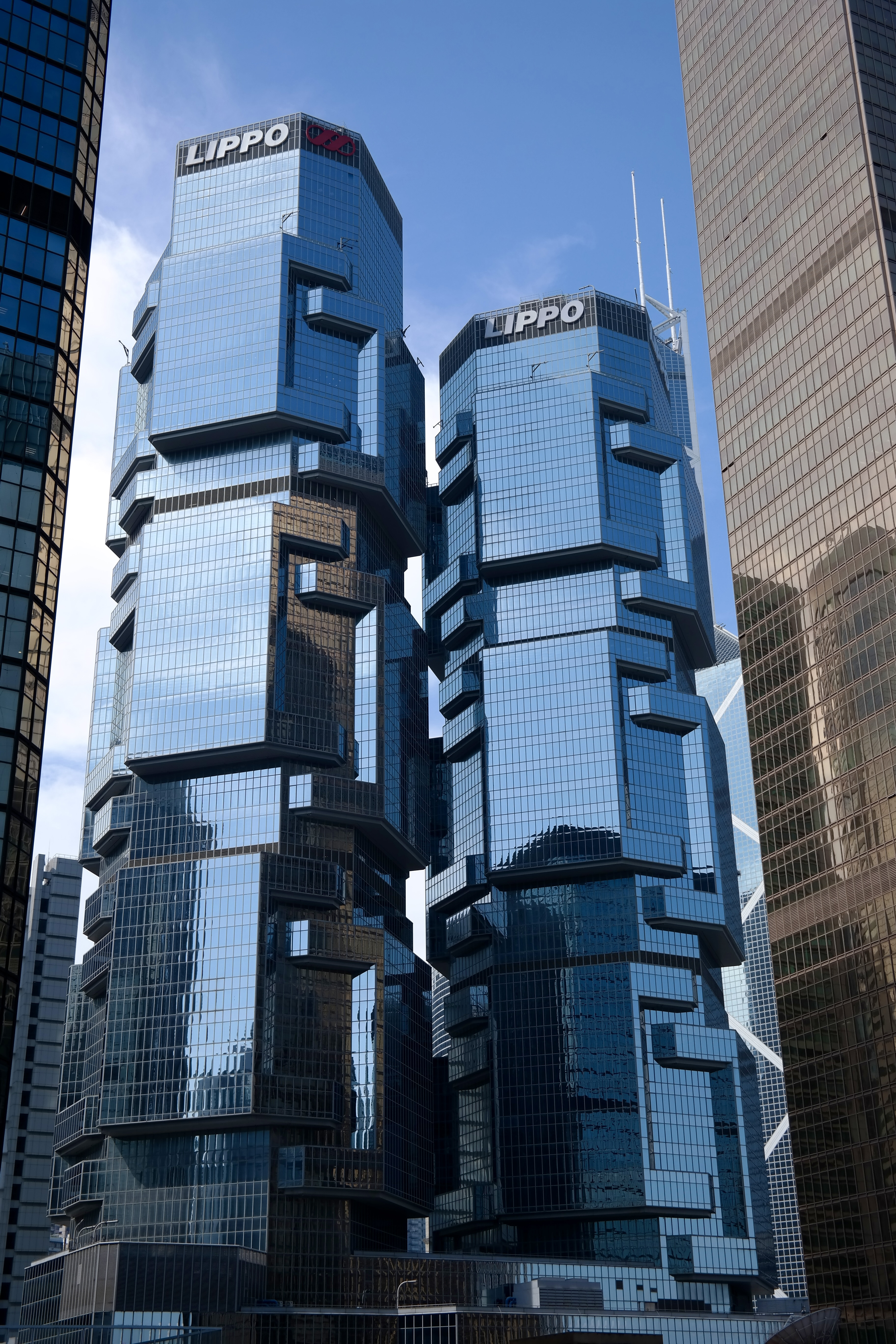
Lippo Centre (1987)

== See also ==
- Spaces: The Architecture of Paul Rudolph
