= J. W. Chorley Elementary School =

Coordinates: 41°27′35.1″N 74°25′19.9″W

Location
- Middletown, New York; United States

Information
- Established: 1964

J. W. Chorley Elementary School was a modernist architecture school building in Middletown, New York designed by American architect Paul Rudolph while he was serving as Dean of the Yale School of Architecture. The school was torn down in November 2012.

The school was built from 1964 - 1969 and included an open floor plan. It featured a "progressive" design and was built on a 27-acre campus. It was the only building he designed to serve children.

The weblog inhabitat ran a feature on the destruction of Rudolph's work including Chorley Elementary and Rudolph's Sarasota High School building. In 2010, the Preservation League in New York named John W. Chorley Elementary School to its 2010 Seven to Save list of threatened properties. In 2010 the Center for Architecture held an event examining the school and plans to replace it with a parking lot. The Library of Congress has an architectural drawing of the school in its collection.

The building included clerestory windows for natural light.

The school was demolished in November, 2012.

Rudolph's oeuvre of work fell out of favor along with many works described as Brutalist architecture in the 1970s. But in the new millennium interest in his work, conservation, and restoration have brought renewed interest and vigor to preservation efforts seeking to maintain his remaining works.
