= Walker Guest House =

Beach house by Paul Rudolph

- Location within Florida Location within the United States
- 26°26′09″N 82°07′25″W
- Type: Experimental design: Skeletal wood frame with movable privacy panels
- Location: Sanibel, Florida, U.S.

History
- Built: 1953

Site notes
- Architect: Paul Rudolph
- Architectural styles: Modern architecture International Style; Sarasota School of Architecture

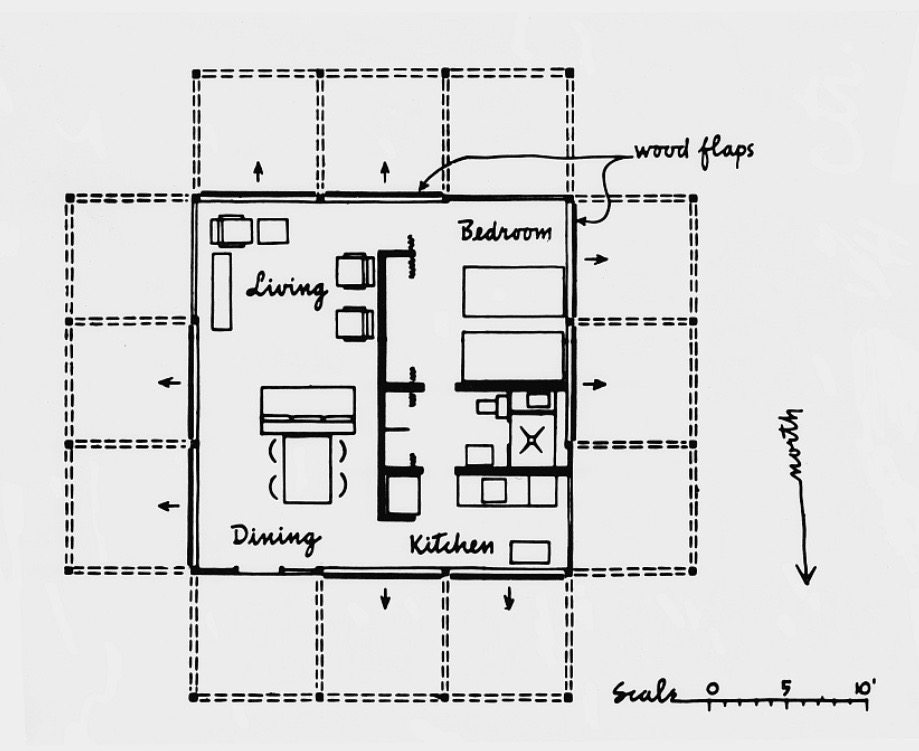
Walker Guest House Floor Plan (Library of Congress)

The Walker Guest House was a compact modern beach structure originally built on Sanibel Island, Florida, for Dr. Walter Walker. It was designed in 1952 by Paul Rudolph as an architectural response to Mies van der Rohe’s Farnsworth House and Philip Johnson’s Glass House. It is considered a ground-breaking work of environmental design, and one of the most important works of architecture of the twentieth century.

== Radical design ==
Dr. Walker, grandson of Minneapolis lumber baron TB Walker was a patron of the arts, and commissioned rising architect Paul Rudolph to design a work of modern architecture for a newly acquired beach property on Sanibel Island, on the west coast of Florida. At the time, Sanibel was a pristine and undeveloped archipelago, accessible only by ferry boat. It was Rudolph’s first independent project after his split with partner Ralph Twitchell, and both client and architect shared a vision of radical simplicity based on its elemental surroundings. A cubic, skeletal design was conceived using an eight foot by eight foot grid, vertically and horizontally, creating a twenty-four foot square (576 square feet). A slightly raised exo-steel frame built directly on the sand would support movable wood panels, enabling the house to seamlessly merge indoor and outdoor space. It was Rudolph's most clearly articulated and rigorously geometric residential project in Florida.

== Form and function ==
The structure was built entirely of lightweight steel, dimensional lumber, and glass in modular sections that enabled it to be easily transported and fabricated on the island. Its raised and nimble footprint was environmentally deliberate, creating an illusion that Rudolph described as “a spider crouching in the sand.” It seemed to be placed perfectly in the dunes and scrub. The perimeter of the exterior frame featured either glass panels or screening to shield itself from insects. The interior was zoned geometrically by function; dining, living, and bedroom.

The most iconic feature of the house were the wrap-around adjustable wood panels that swung up and outward on the steel frame using pulleys and seventy-seven pound red-painted cannonball weights and cleats, earning the house the nickname ‘the cannonball house'. This rigging system was similar to those on sailboats. This flexibility facilitated an almost limitless array of functions, from a completely private shelter to a wide-open and breezy pavilion. “With all the panels lowered the house is a snug cottage, but when the panels are raised it becomes a large screened pavilion,” Rudolph said about the home. “If you desire to retire from the world you have a cave, but when you feel good there is the joy of an open pavilion.” The flat-wood panels also providing shade when fully extended, thus extending the living space into the adjacent landscape.

Rudolph considered the guesthouse to be one of his favorite projects, exhibiting pure architectural ideals suited to its environment.

The house was featured in Progressive Architecture, McCalls, and Architectural Forum. Rudolph also discussed the essence of his ascetic design in Perspecta and The Journal of the American Institute of Architects. In February 1957, Architectural Record nominated fourteen homes as part of their “One hundred years of significant building,” listing the most vigorous and imaginative design of houses in America. The Walker Guest House was included, among other works such as Fallingwater, Gamble House, Farnsworth House, and Glass House.

In more recent years, the Walker Guest House has become an icon of elegant simplicity, a symbol of hopefulness, frugality, and practicality for the future. In a Wall Street Journal article published in 2017, art critic Terry Teachout described the Walker Guest House as “a’tiny house’ that predates by more than half-century the current craze for scaled down dwellings.”

== Preservation ==
The Walker family owned and lived in the guesthouse for sixty-eight years. The guest house location, on one and a half acres of prime gulf real estate put it in danger of demolition. In order to preserve the structure, the family placed the building in the Sotheby’s “Important Design” auction, and it sold for $750,000 in 2019. A video documentary of the building was produced, entitled Expert Voices: Paul Rudolph and the Dynamic Genius of the Walker House, featuring Walker family member Tian Dayton and Pulitzer Prize-winning architecture critic Paul Goldberger.

[The Walker Guest House] will almost surely leave Sanibel Island, but the trade-off will be knowing that one of the most important designs by one of the 20th century’s most important architects—one that, by its nature, is not specific to its site, and could be set down almost anywhere—will be preserved.”

— Paul Goldberger

The guesthouse was sold at auction for $750,000 to a private bidder, disassembled, and moved to California.

The Sarasota Architectural Foundation built a full-scale replica of the guest house in 2015. It was installed and opened for tours at the Ringling Museum for two years. It was moved in 2018 to Palm Springs, California for “Modernism Week”, the city's mid-century modern design festival. It was auctioned in 2020.

== Bibliography ==
- Rudolph, Paul; Sibyl, Moholy-Nagy; Schwab, Gerhard (1970). The Architecture of Paul Rudolph. Thames & Hudson. p. 240. ISBN 9780500090572.
- Rudolph, Paul (2009). Writings on Architecture. Yale University Press. p. 164. ISBN 9780300150926.
- Rohan, Timothy (2014). The Architecture of Paul Rudolph. New haven, CT: Yale University Press. p. 290. ISBN 978-0300149395.
- Rohan, Timothy (2017). Reassessing Rudolph. New haven, CT: Yale University Press. p. 186. ISBN 9780300225860.
- King, Joseph and Domin, Christopher (February 1, 2002). Paul Rudolph: The Florida Houses. Princeton Architectural Press. p. 248. ISBN 9781568982663.
- Howey, John (1995). The Sarasota School of Architecture: 1941 - 1966. Cambridge, MA: MIT Press. p. 209. ISBN 978-0262082402.
- Stern, Robert; Davidson, Cynthia (2009). Architecture on the Edge of Postmodernism. New haven, CT: Yale University Press. p. 216. ISBN 978-0300153972.
- Hitchcock, Henry-Russell and Drexler, Arthur (1952). Built in USA; post-war architecture (PDF). New York, NY: Museum of Modern Art. pp. 111–113. ISBN 978-1258490690.
- Hochstim, Jan (2005). Florida Modern : Residential Architecture 1945-1970. Rizzoli New York. pp. 170–179. ISBN 978-0847826032.
