= Rudolph Hall =

Brutalist building in New Haven, Connecticut

Coordinates: 41.3087°N 72.9319°W

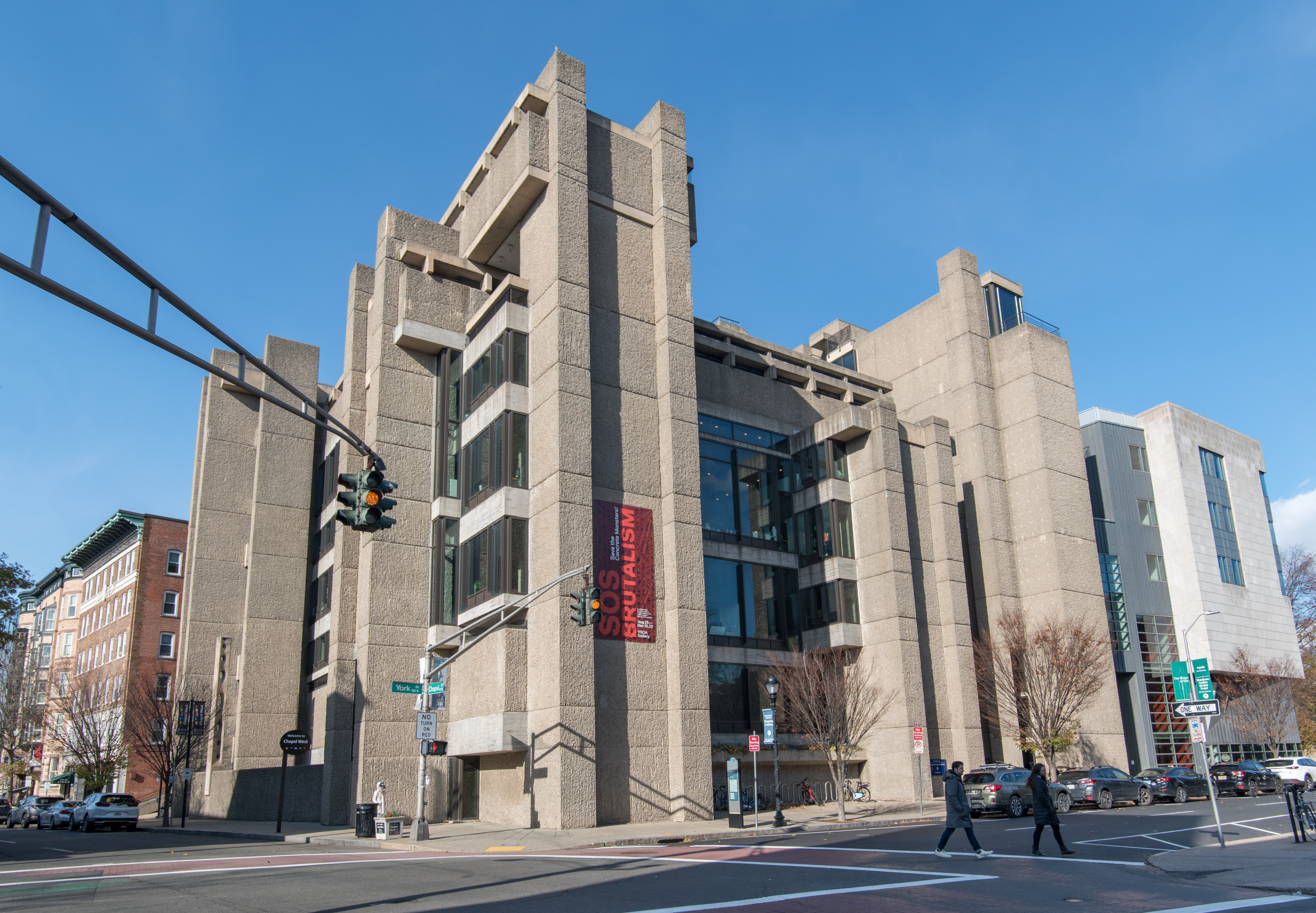
Rudolph Hall in 2022, showing the 2008 addition to the right of Paul Rudolph's original Brutalist structure

Rudolph Hall (built as the Yale Art and Architecture Building, nicknamed the A & A Building, and given its present name in 2007) is one of the earliest and best-known examples of Brutalist architecture in the United States. Completed in 1963 in New Haven, Connecticut, the building houses Yale University's School of Architecture. Until 2000, it also housed the School of Art.

== Construction ==
Designed by the building's namesake, architect Paul Rudolph, the complex building contains more than 30 floor levels in its seven stories. The building is made of ribbed, bush-hammered concrete. The design was influenced by Frank Lloyd Wright's Larkin Administration Building in Buffalo, New York, and the later buildings of Le Corbusier.

== History ==
The building was dedicated on November 8, 1963, to wide praise by critics and academics. It received several prestigious awards, including the Award of Honor by the American Institute of Architects. New York Times architecture critic Ada Louise Huxtable called it "a spectacular tour de force." But the building also had detractors from the start. In a speech at the dedication ceremony, architecture historian Nikolaus Pevsner bemoaned what he called the structure's oppressive monumentality.

Over the following decade, the critical reaction to the building became more negative.

A large fire on the night of June 14, 1969, caused extensive damage. The fire was rumored to have been set by anti-establishment protesters, but this charge has remained unproven.

During the repairs, many changes were made to Rudolph's original design. Mezzanine levels were inserted, spaces broken up, and double-glazing added. Later, a renovation scheme by Beyer Blinder Belle was commissioned but only partially executed, if at all.

In 2000, the School of Art moved out to its own building.

As the building approached its 40th year, appreciation of the structure had increased to the point that Yale began planning a renovation and addition. In 2001, initial commissions were given to David Childs of Skidmore, Owings & Merrill for the former and Richard Meier for the latter. Then Yale "parted ways" with those two, and gave the commission to Gwathmey Siegel & Associates Architects, whose Charles Gwathmey was a Yale Architecture alumnus and former student of Rudolph's. Yale spent $126 million on the project between 2007 and 2008, including a $20 million gift for the purpose from alumnus Sid Bass. The renovation returned the building to more closely hew to Rudolph's design. At the same time, an addition was built with classroom and office space, two lecture theatres, a cafe, and a ground-floor library.

In 2014, the building received the Landmark Plaque, the highest honor bestowed by the New Haven Preservation Trust.

== See also ==
- Yale School of Architecture
- Yale School of Art
