= Myrick Howard =

American historic preservationist (born 1953)

Myrick Howard is an American historic preservationist, best known for his leadership of Preservation North Carolina (PNC), where he served as president from 1978 until his retirement in 2023. Under his guidance, PNC became a national model for historic preservation, facilitating the protection and revitalization of over 900 historic properties across the state.

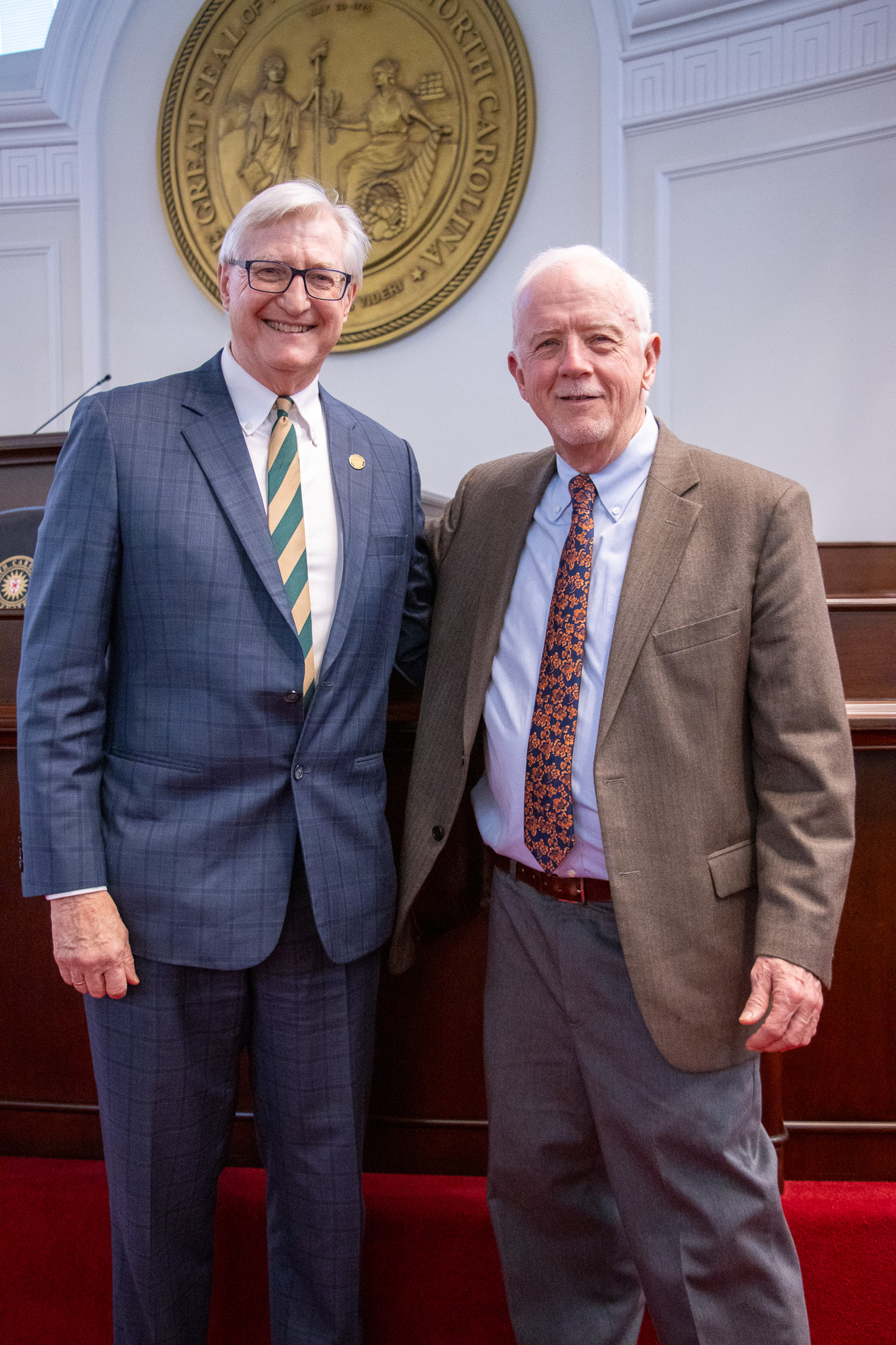
Myrick Howard (Right), President Emeritus of Preservation North Carolina, stands with fellow Preservation NC Alum Senator Ted Alexander at the NC legislative building in Raleigh, NC.

== Early life and education ==
James Myrick Howard was born on April 22, 1953, in Durham, North Carolina. He attended Durham public schools and was recognized as a National Merit Scholar at Durham High School with a 4-year scholarship from American Tobacco. In 1970, Howard enrolled at Brown University, where he studied for two years before transferring to the University of North Carolina at Chapel Hill in 1972 due to family health issues. At UNC-Chapel Hill, he pursued a double major in law and urban planning, earning his degrees in 1978.

In 2024, at the age of 71, Howard enrolled in Duke University's graduate liberal studies program.

== Career with Preservation North Carolina ==
Howard began his career with Preservation North Carolina (PNC) shortly after completing his graduate studies in 1978, it was his first job. Within a month, he was promoted to executive director, the start of a 45-year tenure.

Under Howard's leadership, PNC grew from a small operation to one of the most influential historic preservation organizations in the United States. He established a revolving fund. This approach involved acquiring endangered historic properties, stabilizing them, and reselling them with protective covenants in place. Through this method, PNC saved over 900 historic properties across North Carolina, including the Loray Mill in Gastonia and the Glencoe Mill Village Historic District in Burlington.

Howard advocated for adaptive reuse, emphasizing the economic and cultural benefits of repurposing historic structures. This approach preserved architectural heritage but also revitalized neighborhoods and spurred economic development in communities across the state.

Howard worked to preserve North Carolina's Rosenwald Schools, built in the early 20th century to educate African American children in the segregated South. Howard mobilized resources and support to protect these structures.

Howard raised awareness about the importance of historic preservation through public speaking and media appearances. He appeared on programs dedicated to architecture and urban planning and contributed articles to journals and magazines in the field.

After his retirement in 2023, Howard worked as a consultant on preservation and was on advisory boards for preservation organizations. The Myrick Howard Preservation Award was established in his honor to recognize individuals and groups making outstanding contributions to preserving North Carolina's history.

== Academic contributions ==
Since 1988, Howard has been the Marion S. Covington Professor of Practice in Historic Preservation at the University of North Carolina at Chapel Hill's Department of City and Regional Planning. From 1988 to 2023, he taught a graduate seminar on Historic Preservation Planning each year at UNC.

In 2024, at the age of 71, Howard returned to academia by enrolling in Duke University's Graduate Liberal Studies program. His research interests include analyzing the relationship between North Carolina and the slave trade, reflecting his ongoing commitment to understanding and preserving the state's complex history.

== Publications ==
Howard has written Buying Time for Heritage: How to Save an Endangered Historic Property, a guide to preservation techniques. The second edition, published by the University of North Carolina Press, includes projects on renovating vacant houses in working-class neighborhoods and reflections on addressing racial equity through preservation. The book offers strategies for saving threatened buildings through revolving funds and protective covenants, which Howard pioneered during his time at Preservation North Carolina.

Howard has written scholarly articles, with a focus on adaptive reuse and preservation economics. His work also explores racial equity within the preservation field, examining how historic sites can reflect and preserve diverse cultural histories. His writing has been published in preservation journals and in educational curricula.

== Awards and recognition ==
- National Trust for Historic Preservation's Louise E. du Pont Crowninshield Award - National Trust for Historic Preservation's highest recognition.
- The Ruth Coltrane Cannon Award - presented to an individual or organization that has made contributions of statewide significance to historic preservation in North Carolina.
- Tar Heel of the Year Award - The News & Observer's Tar Heel of the Year, which recognizes North Carolinians for their contributions to the Triangle, the state and beyond.
- Preservation North Carolina's Myrick Howard Preservation Award – Named in his honor to acknowledge outstanding contributions to preservation.
