= List of Brutalist architecture in the United States =

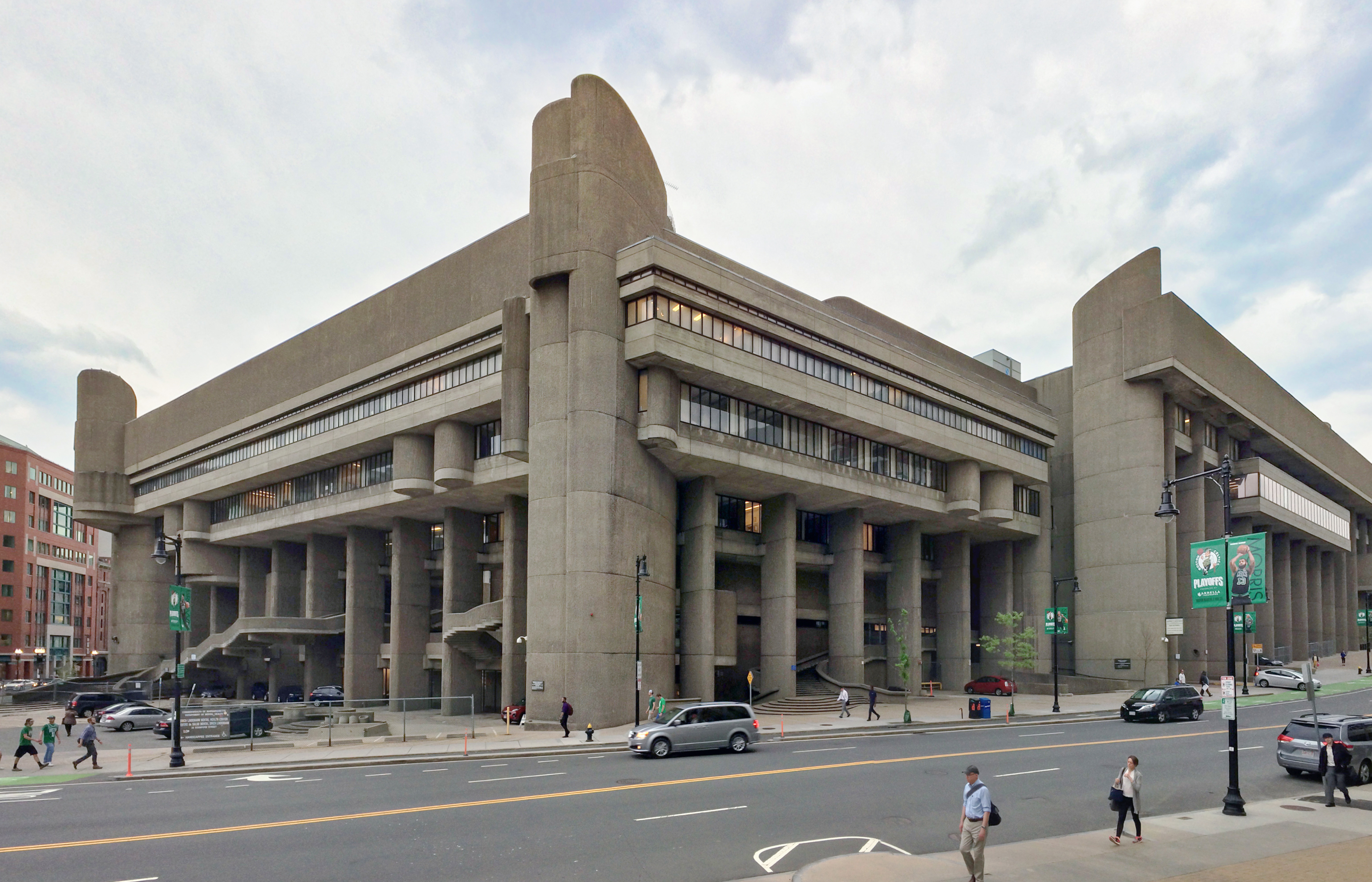
The Boston Government Service Center in Boston, Massachusetts

This is a list of buildings that are examples of the Brutalist architectural style in the United States.

== Alabama ==
- University Chapel, Tuskegee University, Tuskegee

== Alaska ==
- Z.J. Loussac Public Library, Anchorage (1986)

== Arizona ==
- Phoenix Symphony Hall, Phoenix (1969-1972)
- Regency on Central, 2323 N. Central Ave., Phoenix (1964)

== Arkansas ==
- Bank of America Plaza, Little Rock

== California ==
- All original Bay Area Rapid Transit (BART) stations, San Francisco Bay Area (1972–73)
- Berkeley Art Museum and Pacific Film Archive (former campus on Bancroft Way), UC Berkeley, (Mario Ciampi, 1970)
- Briggs Hall, University of California, Davis (unknown, 1971) (Smith Barker Hanssen, architects)
- Cal Poly Pomona College of Environmental Design
- Campus of the University of California, Irvine
  - Claire Trevor School of the Arts
  - Crawford Hall (Irvine)
- Cathedral of St. Mary of the Assumption, San Francisco
- Crafton Hills Community College, Yucaipa
- Cypress College, Cypress
- Earl Warren College
- Embarcadero Substation, San Francisco
- Embarcadero Center, San Francisco (John C. Portman Jr., 1968)
- Evans Hall (UC Berkeley)
- Geisel Library, University of California, San Diego, San Diego (William Pereira, 1970)
- Hilton San Francisco Financial District
- Huntington Beach Public Library
- Hyatt Regency San Francisco Airport
- Inglewood City Hall, Inglewood, California
- Irvine High School
- Oakland Museum of California, Oakland (Kevin Roche, 1969)
- Portsmouth Square pedestrian bridge
- Salk Institute for Biological Studies, La Jolla
- Sam Bell Pavilion, La Jolla
- Samitaur, Los Angeles
- San Diego Stadium, San Diego, (Frank L. Hope & Associates, 1967) (demolished)
- Sears, Roebuck and Company Pacific Coast Territory Administrative Offices, Alhambra
- Sheats Goldstein House, Los Angeles
- St. Basil's Catholic Church, Los Angeles
- UC Berkeley College of Environmental Design, Baur-Wurster Hall Berkeley, Vernon DeMars, (1964)
- Vaillancourt Fountain, Justin Herman Plaza, San Francisco (Armand Vaillancourt, 1971)
- Yosemite Hall, Cal Poly, San Luis Obispo, San Luis Obispo (Falk & Booth, 1969)

== Colorado ==
- Arapahoe Community College, Littleton (1974)
- Federal Reserve Bank of Kansas City Denver Branch, Denver
- Mesa Laboratory, Boulder (1966)
- Engineering Center, University of Colorado at Boulder, Boulder (1965)

== Connecticut ==
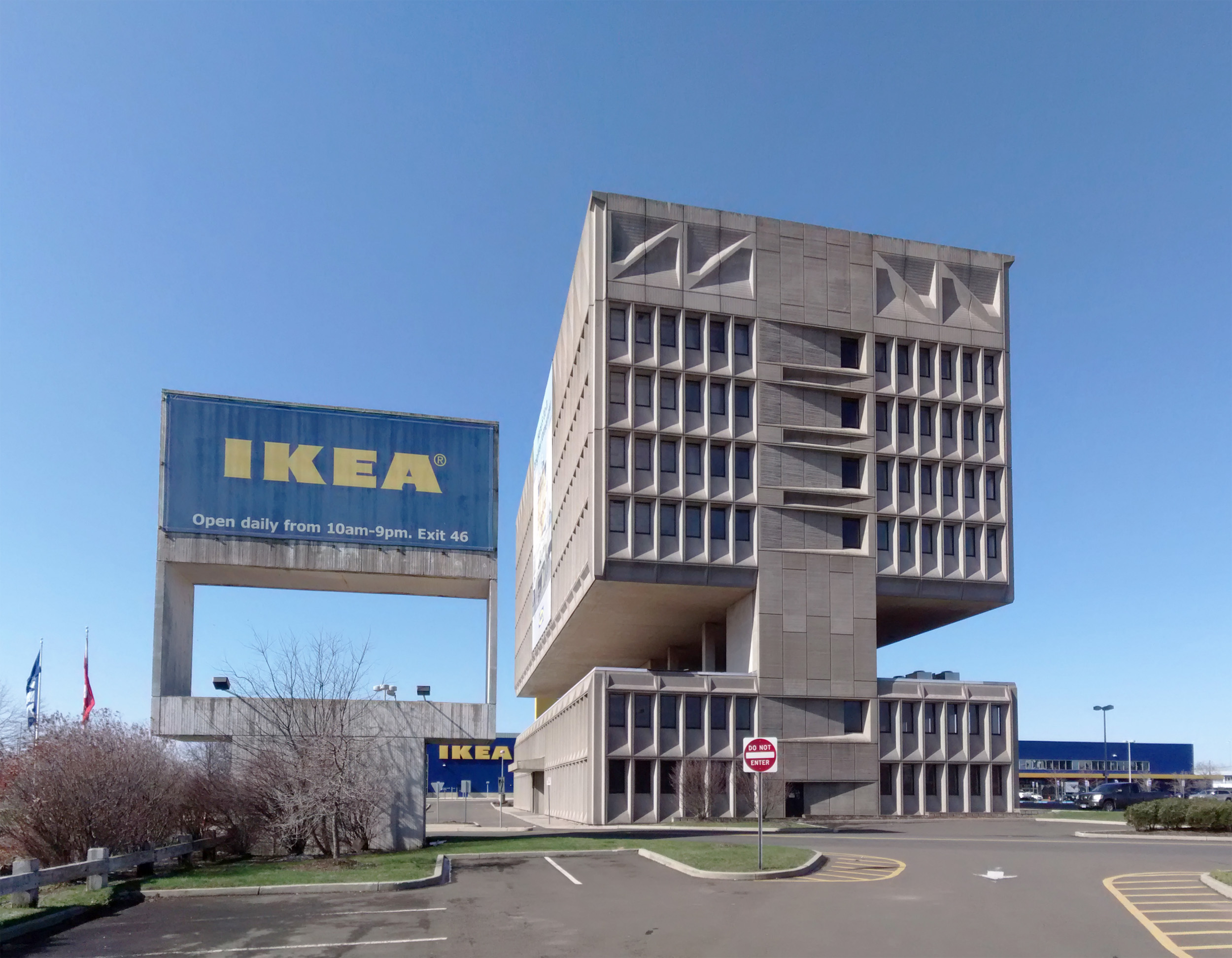
Pirelli Tire Building, New Haven, Connecticut, United States

- Becton Engineering and Applied Science Center, Yale University, New Haven
- Beinecke Rare Book & Manuscript Library, New Haven
- Community Services Building, New Haven
- Crawford Manor
- Dixwell Avenue Congregational United Church of Christ
- Ezra Stiles and Samuel Morse Colleges, Yale University, New Haven
- Homer D. Babbidge Library
- Hotel Marcel (former Pirelli Tire Building), New Haven (Marcel Breuer & Robert F. Gatje, 1969)
- Kline Biology Tower
- Knights of Columbus Building, New Haven
- Louis Micheels House
- New Haven Central Fire Station, New Haven
- New Haven Coliseum, New Haven (Kevin Roche / John Dinkeloo & Associates, 1972) (demolished 2006–2007)
- Rudolph Hall, New Haven (Paul Rudolph, 1963)
- Temple Street Parking Garage, New Haven

== Delaware ==
- I. M. Pei Building, Wilmington

== Florida ==
- 1111 Lincoln Road, Miami
- Crystal River Archeological State Park Museum. (David Reaves and Dan Branch, 1965)
- Disney's Contemporary Resort, Walt Disney World (Welton Becket, 1971)
- Mailman Center for Child Development, Miami
- Metrorail stations, early 1980s heavy metro system (1984)
- Miami-Dade County School Board Administration Building South Tower, Miami
- Office in the Grove, Coconut Grove, Miami (Kenneth Treister, 1972)
- Orlando Public Library, Orlando (John M. Johansen, 1966)
- The University of Florida Levin College of Law
- National Hurricane Center headquarters, Miami
- Chapel of the Upper Room, FSU Wesley Foundation, Tallahassee (Victor Lundy, 1974, Demolished 2015)

== Georgia ==
- AmericasMart Building 3, Atlanta
- Atlanta Central Library, Atlanta
- Atlanta Marriott Marquis, Atlanta
- CNN Center, Atlanta
- Colony Square, Atlanta
- Park Place on Peachtree condominiums, Atlanta (Ted Levy, 1984–1987)

=== DeKalb County ===
Structures include:

- Southern Bell Telephone & Telegraph Co., 2204 LaVista Road NE (ca. 1970)
- Robert T. "Bobby" Burgess Building, DeKalb County Police Department, 3610 Camp Drive (1972)
- First National Bank of Atlanta, 2849 N. Druid Hills Road NE (ca. 1973)
- Clairemont Oaks, 441 Clairemont Avenue (1973-1975)
- DeKalb County Parking Deck, 125 W. Trinity Place (1974)
- Brevard Professional Building, 246 Sycamore Street (1974)
- Woodruff Health Sciences Center Administrative Building (WHSCAB) at Emory University, 1440 Clifton Road (1976)
- Emory Rehabilitation Hospital, 1441 Clifton Road (1976)
- Coan Recreation Center, 1530 Woodbine Avenue SE (1976)
- Bank of America, 155 Clairemont Avenue (ca. 1982)
- Kensington Marta Station, 3350 Kensington Road (1993)

== Hawaii ==
- Hawaii State Capitol
- Hawai'i Hochi Building
- Jefferson Hall, East–West Center

== Idaho ==
- Intermountain Gas Building, Boise
- Whiting House, Sun Valley
- Idaho Power Headquarters, Idaho

== Illinois ==
- Arthur J. Schmitt Academic Center, DePaul University. Chicago (C.F. Murphy and Associates, 1968)
- Blue Cross-Blue Shield Building
- Cummings Life Sciences Center, Chicago
- Faner Hall (SIUC), Southern Illinois University Carbondale, Carbondale (1974)
- Henry Hinds Laboratory, Chicago
- Joseph Regenstein Library, University of Chicago (Walter Netsch, 1970)
- Kirsch Residence, Oak Park
- Lincoln Executive Plaza, Chicago
- Marina City, Chicago
- Metropolitan Correctional Center, Chicago
- Norris University Center
- Northwestern University Library, Evanston, (Walter Netsch, 1966–70)
- Old Prentice Women's Hospital Building
- Raymond Hilliard Homes, Chicago* Thomas Rees Memorial Carillon, Washington Park, Springfield, Bill Turley, (1962)
- University Hall (University of Illinois Chicago)
- Will County Courthouse, Joliet (1969)

== Indiana ==
- Bracken Library
- Clowes Memorial Hall, Butler University, Indianapolis, Evans Woollen III and John M. Johansen, (1963)
- College Life Insurance Company of America Headquarters, Indianapolis
- Eskenazi Museum of Art, Indiana University Bloomington, Bloomington (I. M. Pei, 1982)
- Herman B Wells Library, Indiana University Bloomington, Bloomington (Eggers & Higgins, 1966–69)
- Indiana University Auditorium, Indiana University Bloomington, Bloomington
- Indiana University Musical Arts Center, Indiana University Bloomington, Bloomington (Woollen, Molzan and Partners, 1972)
- Minton–Capehart Federal Building, Indianapolis (Evans Woollen III, Woollen, Molzan and Partners, 1976)
- Southside Junior High School, Columbus

== Iowa ==
- Carver Hall
- Civic Center of Greater Des Moines
- Iowa State Center

== Kansas ==
- Wichita Central Library, Wichita (Schaefer, Schirmer & Eflin, 1965-1967)
- Kansas Judicial Center, Topeka

== Kentucky ==
- Kentucky International Convention Center
- Patterson Office Tower

== Louisiana ==
Structures include

- Baton Rouge River Center
- Hale Boggs Memorial Bridge
- Lafayette Parish courthouse
- Louisiana National Bank Building.
- Tangipahoa Parish courthouse

== Maine ==
- Franklin Towers
- University of Maine School of Law Building

== Maryland ==
- Baltimore County Circuit Courthouses, Towson
- Morris A. Mechanic Theatre, Baltimore (John M. Johansen, 1967) (demolished 2014)

== Massachusetts ==
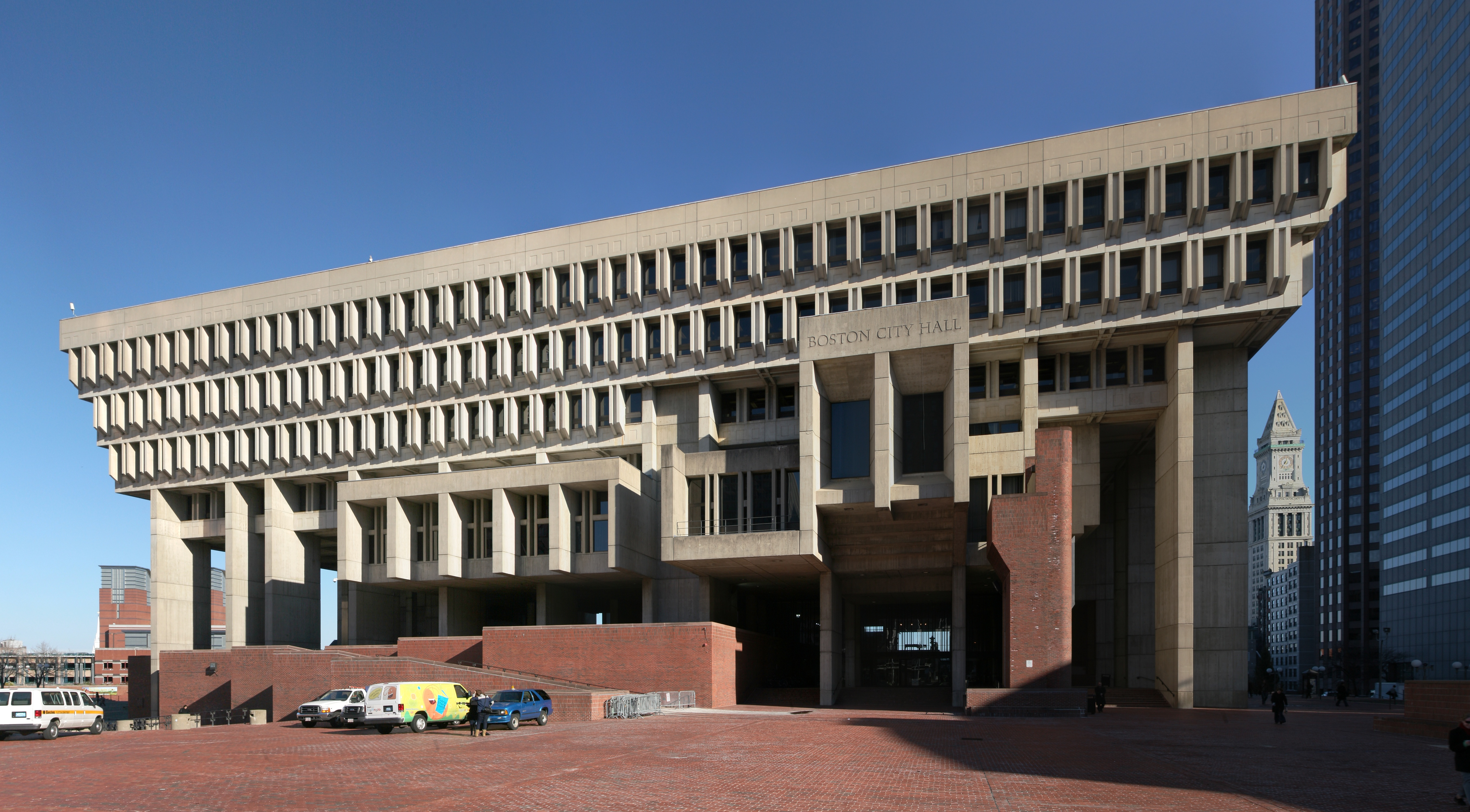
Boston City Hall, United States

- 177 Huntington
- 320 Newbury Street (Boston Architectural College), Boston (Ashley, Myer & Associates, 1966)
- Alewife station, Cambridge (Ellenzweig, 1985)
- Boston City Hall, Boston (Kallmann McKinnell & Knowles/Campbell, Aldrich & Nulty, 1969)
- Boston Government Service Center, Boston (Paul Rudolph, 1962–71)
- Braintree High School, Braintree (1972)
- Campus of the Massachusetts Institute of Technology
- Carpenter Center for the Visual Arts, Harvard University, Cambridge (Le Corbusier, (1962)
- Countway Library - Harvard University, Boston
- Fall River Government Center, Fall River (1976)
- Fine Arts Center, University of Massachusetts, Amherst (Kevin Roche, 1975)
- The First Church of Christ, Scientist
- George Gund Hall, Harvard Graduate School of Design, Cambridge (John Andrews, 1972)
- George Sherman Union
- Harbor Towers
- Larsen Hall, Harvard University, Cambridge
- Law and Education Tower, Boston University, Boston
- Lawrence Public Library, Lawrence (Henneberg & Henneberg Architects, 1973)
- Lincoln House, Lincoln
- Mather House, Cambridge (Shepley, Bulfinch, Richardson and Abbot, 1971)
- Murray D. Lincoln Campus Center, University of Massachusetts, Amherst
- One Western Avenue, Harvard Business School, Boston
- Peabody Terrace
- Robert H. Goddard Library, Clark University, Worcester (John M. Johansen, 1969)
- Simmons Hall, Cambridge
- Smith Campus Center
- Solomon Carter Fuller Mental Health Center, Boston (1974)
- Technology Square
- Tisch Library
- University of Massachusetts Boston, Boston
- University of Massachusetts Dartmouth, Dartmouth (Paul Rudolph)
- Wollaston station, Quincy (1971)

== Michigan ==
- Blue Cross/Blue Shield Service Center, Detroit, Michigan (Ginno Rossetti, 1971)
- Grand Traverse Performing Arts Center at Interlochen Center for the Arts, Interlochen, Michigan (1975)
- St. Francis de Sales Church, Norton Shores

== Minnesota ==
- Arvonne Fraser Library
- Malcolm Moos Health Sciences Tower, University of Minnesota, Minneapolis (c. 1970)
- Peavey Plaza
- Phillips-Wangensteen Building, University of Minnesota Hospital, Minneapolis (1976)
- Rarig Center
- Riverside Plaza, Minneapolis (Ralph Rapson, 1973)
- Saint John's Abbey, Collegeville (1958-1961)

== Mississippi ==
- Lamar Law Center, University of Mississippi
- St. Richard's Catholic Church, Jackson
- Tougaloo College, Jackson
  - A.A. Branch Hall
  - L. Zenobia Coleman Library
  - Renner Hall

== Missouri ==
- Nestlé Purina PetCare Headquarters
- Pointe400 Luxury Apartments, formerly the Pet Milk Building, St. Louis, MO
- Roy Blunt Hall at Missouri State University
- Crown Center, Kansas City, MO
- Kansas City International Airport, Kansas City, MO (original semi-circle terminals opened in November 1972, which were demolished to build a new single terminal which opened in February 2023)

== Montana ==
- Montana State University Billings Liberal Arts Building

== Nebraska ==
- Robert V. Denney Federal Building
- Wells Fargo Center, Lincoln, NE (I.M. Pei, 1975)

== Nevada ==
- William D. Carlson Education Building, University of Nevada, Las Vegas, Las Vegas

== New Hampshire ==
- Christensen Hall, University of New Hampshire, Durham (Ulrich Franzen, 1970)
- Phillips Exeter Academy Library, Exeter

== New Jersey ==
- 550 Broad Street
- Galaxy Towers
- Journal Square Transportation Center, Jersey City, New Jersey (1973–1975)

== New Mexico ==
- Farris Engineering Center, University of New Mexico, Albuquerque
- Humanities Building, University of New Mexico, Albuquerque
- Main Library, Albuquerque (George Pearl, 1978) – listed on the National Register of Historic Places in 2019.
- Spaceport America, Truth or Consequences

== New York ==
- Bradfield Hall, Cornell University, Ithaca
- Buffalo City Court Building, Buffalo (1974)
- Cube House, Ithaca
- Empire State Plaza, Albany
  - Cultural Education Center (1976-1978)
  - The Egg
- Endo Pharmaceuticals Building, Garden City
- Engineering Building, Binghamton University, Vestal (1976)
- Erie Basin Observation Tower, Buffalo
- Everson Museum of Art, Syracuse
- First Unitarian Church, Rochester
- Folsom Library, Rensselaer Polytechnic Institute, Troy (Pierik Quinlivan & Krause, 1976)
- Herbert F. Johnson Museum of Art, Cornell University, Ithaca (I.M. Pei, 1973)
- Hudson River Museum, Yonkers
- J. W. Chorley Elementary School, Middletown
- Orange County Government Center, Goshen (Paul Rudolph, 1967)

=== New York City ===
- 1 Police Plaza (Gruzen and Partners, 1973)
- 811 Tenth Avenue
- 945 Madison Avenue museum building (Marcel Breuer, 1966)
- 33 Thomas Street (AT&T Long Lines Building) (John Carl Warnecke, 1974)
- Adam Clayton Powell Jr. State Office Building (Ifill, Johnson & Hanchard, 1974)
- Boston Road Apartments, Bronx
- Carman Hall, Lehman College, Bronx (1970)
- Chatham Towers, Manhattan
- Edward Durell Stone Townhouse, Manhattan
- Elmer Holmes Bobst Library, New York University (Philip Johnson, Richard Foster)
- Five Manhattan West
- Joseph Curran Building, Manhattan
- Kips Bay Towers
- Lincoln Square Synagogue, Manhattan
- Morrisania Air Rights
- New Museum, Manhattan
- New York Presbyterian Church, Queens
- New York Marriott Marquis
- North Central Bronx Hospital
- River Park Towers
- St. Frances de Chantal's Church
- St. John the Baptist Church
- St. Jude Church
- Temple Israel of the City of New York
- Tracey Towers
- Trinity Chapel, New York University
- University Village
- Waterside Plaza
- Weiss Research Building, Manhattan

== North Carolina ==
- Bath Building, Raleigh
- Elion-Hitchings Building (Burroughs Wellcome headquarters), Durham (1971, demolished)
- Hiram H. Ward Federal Courthouse, Winston-Salem

== North Dakota ==
- Our Lady of the Annunciation Chapel at Annunciation Priory, Bismarck, North Dakota

== Ohio ==
- Bricker Federal Building, Columbus
- Cleveland Museum of Art Education Wing, Cleveland
- Continental Center, Columbus
- Crosley Tower, Cincinnati
- Hamilton County Justice Center, Cincinnati
- Huntington Plaza, Columbus
- Hyatt Regency Columbus, Columbus
- John F. Seiberling Federal Building and United States Courthouse, Akron
- Justice Center Complex, Cleveland
- Maag Library, Youngstown State University, Youngstown (1976)
- The Ohio History Center, Columbus, (W. Byron Ireland & Associates, 1966)
- Rhodes State Office Tower, Columbus
- Rhodes Tower, Cleveland
- Seeley G. Mudd Learning Center, Oberlin College Library, Oberlin (Warner, Burns, Toan & Lunde, 1974)
- Sheraton Columbus Hotel at Capitol Square, Columbus
- The 9 Cleveland, Cleveland

== Oklahoma ==
- Mummers Theater, Oklahoma City John M. Johansen (demolished)
- Oklahoma Case Study House.
- Public Library of Enid and Garfield County, Enid OK
- Tulsa Civic Center History District. Tulsa, OK

== Oregon ==
- Salem Public Library
- Mount Hood Community College, Gresham

== Pennsylvania ==
- 1700 Market
- Benedum Hall
- Carnegie Library of Pittsburgh – Knoxville Branch, Pittsburgh (Paul Schweikher, 1965)
- Century III Mall, West Mifflin (1979)
- Charles Patterson Van Pelt Library, University of Pennsylvania, Philadelphia
- Jennie King Mellon Library, Chatham University, Pittsburgh
- Main Hall, West Chester University, West Chester (1974)
- Penn Mutual Tower, Philadelphia
- University of Pittsburgh, Pittsburgh
  - Barco Law Building (1976)
  - David Lawrence Hall (1968)
  - Hillman Library (1968)
  - Litchfield Towers (Deeter & Ritchey, 1963)
  - School of Information Sciences Building (Tasso Katselas, 1965)
  - Wesley W. Posvar Hall (1975–1978)
- Wean Hall, Carnegie Mellon University, Pittsburgh (1971)

== Puerto Rico ==
- Casa Alcaldía de Bayamón, Bayamón, Puerto Rico (1980)

== Rhode Island ==
- Classical High School, Providence (1970)
- Community College of Rhode Island Knight Campus, Warwick (1972)
- John D. Rockefeller Jr. Library, Providence (Warner, Burns, Toan & Lunde, 1962–1964)
- John E. Fogarty Memorial Building, Providence
- Sciences Library (Brown University), Providence (1971)

== South Carolina ==
- Strom Thurmond Federal Building and United States Courthouse, Columbia

== South Dakota ==
- McKennan Hospital additions, Sioux Falls
- Northwestern Auto Bank, Sioux Falls
- Stanley J. Marshall HPER Center, South Dakota State University

== Tennessee ==
- Chattanooga Public Library
- Hunter Museum of American Art
- Lawson McGhee Library
- Sheraton Nashville Downtown
- University of Tennessee Art and Architecture Building
- East Tennessee State University D.P. Culp University Center
- Wayne County Courthouse, Waynesboro

== Texas ==
- Alkek Library, Texas State University, San Marcos, Texas (1990)
- Alley Theatre, Houston, Texas (1968)
- Burnett Plaza, Fort Worth, Texas (1983)
- Dallas City Hall, Dallas, Texas (I.M. Pei, 1978)
- Lyndon Baines Johnson Presidential Library, Austin
- Lovett College, Rice University, Houston, Texas (1968)
- Perry–Castañeda Library (PCL), University of Texas at Austin, (1977)
- Webb Chapel Park Pavilion, Dallas

== Utah ==
- Mountain Bell data processing center, Salt Lake City
- University of Utah College of Architecture and Planning
- University of Utah - Social & Behavioral Science
- University of Utah - Student Services Building

== Vermont ==
- Cathedral Church of St. Paul (Burlington, Vermont)
- Charterhouse of the Transfiguration
- Elliott Pratt Center, Goddard College, Plainfield, Vermont

== Virginia ==
- American Press Institute (demolished)
- FBI Academy, Quantico, Virginia (1972)
- The National Conference Center
- Sydney Lewis Hall, Washington and Lee University School of Law, Lexington, Virginia (1977)
- Unitarian Universalist Church of Arlington

== Washington ==
- Alhadeff Sanctuary of Temple De Hirsch, Seattle
- Bellevue Arts Museum, Bellevue
- Freeway Park, Seattle, Washington (Lawrence Halprin, 1972–1976)
- Kane Hall, University of Washington, Seattle (Walker & McGough, 1971)
- Meany Hall, University of Washington, Seattle (Kirk, Wallace & McKinley, 1974)
- Nuclear Reactor Building, University of Washington, The Architect Artist Group/TAAG, (1961)
- Odegaard Undergraduate Library, University of Washington, Seattle (Kirk, Wallace & McKinley, 1972)
- Rainier Tower, Seattle
- Schmitz Hall, University of Washington, Seattle
- St. Joseph's Hospital, Tacoma
- Temple Beth Shalom, Spokane

== Washington, D.C. ==
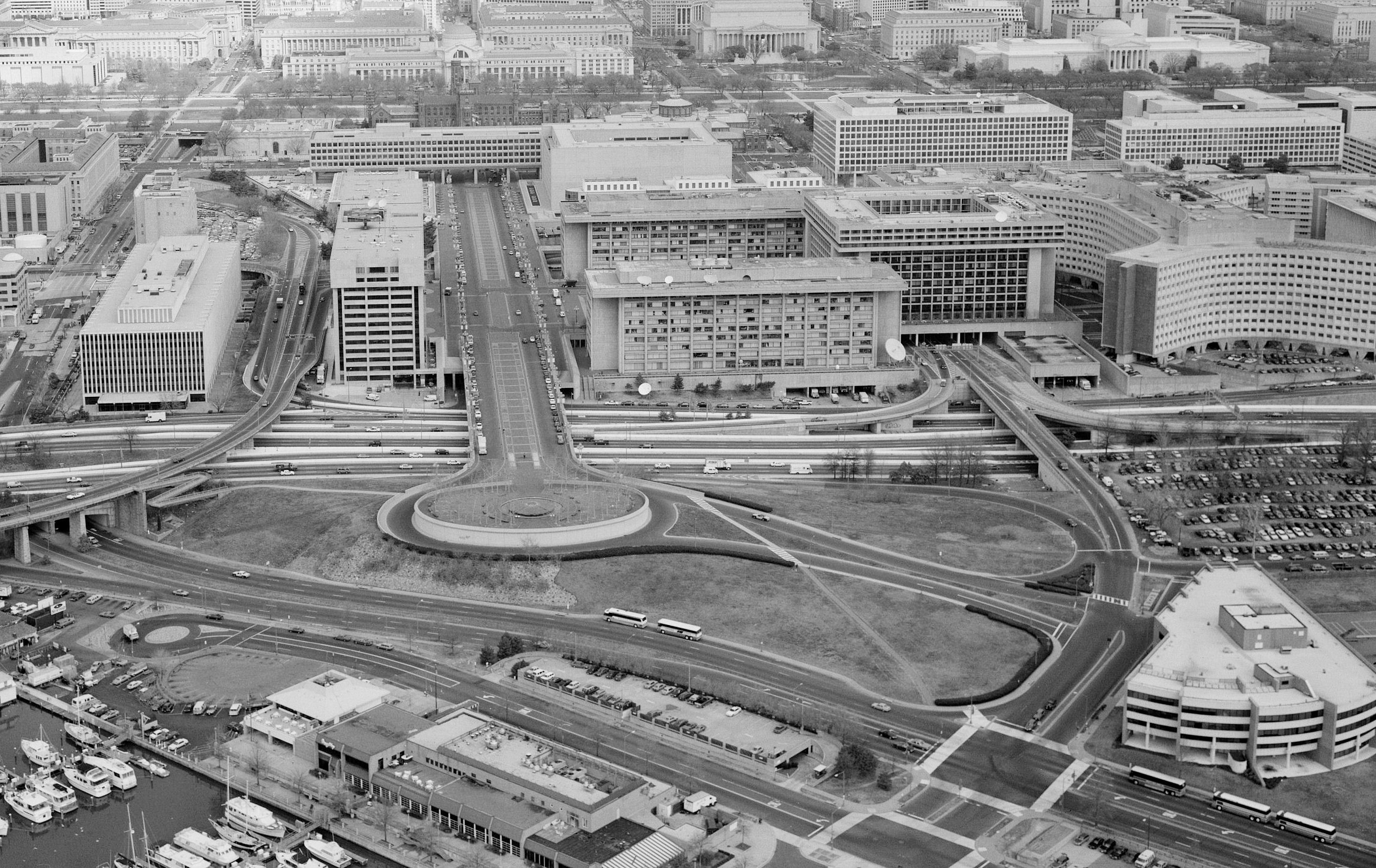
L'Enfant Plaza, Washington, D.C.

- Gelman Library, George Washington University
- Hirshhorn Museum and Sculpture Garden (Gordon Bunshaft, 1974)
- Hubert H. Humphrey Building, the United States Department of Health and Human Services headquarters (1977)
- J. Edgar Hoover Building (FBI national headquarters) (C.F. Murphy, 1974)
- James V. Forrestal Building
- L'Enfant Plaza – a plaza containing many US Government buildings
- Lauinger Library, Georgetown University (John Carl Warnecke, 1970)
- Robert C. Weaver Federal Building
- Third Church of Christ, Scientist (Araldo Cossutta, 1971; demolished 2014)
- Washington Metro stations (1970–2001)
- Washington Hilton

== West Virginia ==
- Hope Coliseum, West Virginia University

== Wisconsin ==
- Central United Methodist Church, Milwaukee (1982)
- Main Post Office, Milwaukee (1968)
- Marcus Center for the Performing Arts, Milwaukee, Wisconsin (Harry Weese, 1966–1969)
- Milwaukee County War Memorial, Milwaukee
- Police Administration Building, Milwaukee (1971)
- Sentry Insurance Headquarters, Stevens Point
- University of Wisconsin, Madison
  - George L. Mosse Humanities Building
  - Vilas Communication Hall
- University of Wisconsin, Milwaukee
  - Curtin Hall, (Maynard W. Mayer & Assoc., 1974)
  - Sandburg Halls (north, south and west towers; 1971–1973)
- Water Street Bridge House, Milwaukee (2982, 1987)
- Wells Fargo Building, Milwaukee (1969)
- Wingspread, Racine

== Wyoming ==
- University of Wyoming dormitories and American Heritage Center

== See also ==
- List of Brutalist structures
