= University Apartments =

University Apartments may refer to:

- University Apartments (Chicago, Illinois), listed on the National Register of Historic Places in Cook County, Illinois
- University Apartments (Missoula, Montana), listed on the National Register of Historic Places in Missoula County, Montana
- University Apartments (Amherst, Massachusetts), former apartments for the University of Massachusetts Amherst
