= Third Church of Christ, Scientist (Washington, D.C.) =

Coordinates: 38.902°N 77.037°W

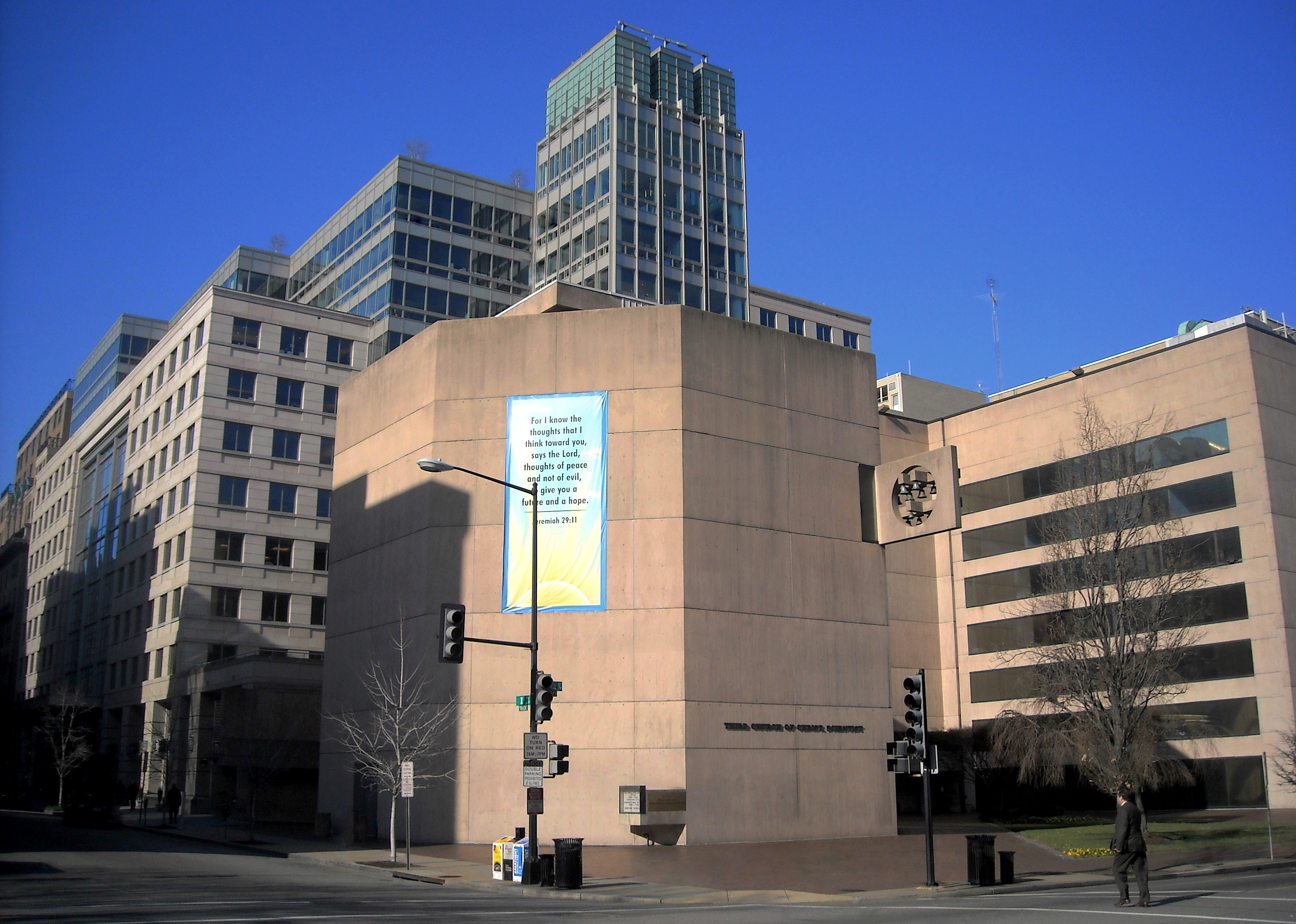
- Third Church of Christ, Scientist

General information
- Architectural style: Brutalist
- Location: Washington, D.C., United States
- Completed: 1971
- Demolished: 2014
- Client: Third Church of Christ, Scientist

Design and construction
- Architect: Araldo Cossutta
- Architecture firm: I. M. Pei & Partners

Third Church of Christ, Scientist, established in 1918, is a Christian Science church in downtown Washington, D.C. From 1971 to 2014, the church was located in a controversial building at 16th and I Street NW. Considered a significant work of "Brutalist" church architecture by some critics, the building was considered unsatisfactory by members of the Church's congregation, which shrank over the years. In 2007, the church applied for a demolition permit for the building to permit the sale and redevelopment of the site, with plans to relocate to a more suitable structure. A 1991 application for landmark status for the building, filed to forestall a demolition threat then, was subsequently approved. After a lawsuit and hearings, the District of Columbia issued a demolition permit in May 2009, and the building was demolished in 2014. In 2015, Third Church merged with First Church of Christ, Scientist. The congregation continues as First Church and conducts its activities in a portion of the new building.

== Early history ==
The Christian Science denomination was founded by Mary Baker Eddy in the 1860s, and the Church of Christ, Scientist was formally established in the 1870s. Third Church of Christ, Scientist is a branch church of the Mother Church, The First Church of Christ, Scientist, in Boston.

Third Church was originally located in a building on Lafayette Park near the White House, shared with the National Woman's Party. In summer 1918, soon after it was established, the church relocated to the Masonic Temple on New York Avenue at 13th Street. In 1927, the church moved to a former Unitarian church building at 13th and L St that it purchased, but then in the 1950s, the church considered options for relocating closer to Lafayette Park.

The site at 16th and I Street NW, owned by the Mother Church, housed the Washington offices of the Church's Committee on Publication. In the 1960s, the Church decided to demolish that building and construct a new office building to house the Committee and The Christian Science Monitor, with space available on the site to accommodate a building for Third Church of Christ, Scientist.

== 16th Street building ==
First Church of Christ, Scientist

In 1970, a new building opened for the church at 16th Street and I Street NW, designed in a brutalist architectural style by Araldo Cossutta, a partner in the firm I. M. Pei & Partners. Cossutta had previously designed the Christian Science Plaza in Boston. The concrete building is octagonal in shape. An adjacent office building was also constructed to house The Christian Science Monitor's Washington Bureau, with a small plaza knitting the two buildings together.

Although many architecture critics admire the building, many members of the Church's congregation disliked it. The Church began to consider selling the property about 1990, which would likely have led to its demolition. In an effort to save the building, two groups independent of the Church applied in 1991 to the District of Columbia to have the building listed as a historic landmark. The congregation opposed the designation, which was not acted on at the time.

The building had been costly to maintain, and was not suited to be re-purposed for another use. Structural defects include cracking in many spots. Maintenance costs included $5,000 – 8,000 for changing lightbulbs in the sanctuary, which involved erecting scaffolding. In 2007, the land itself was sold in 2007 to ICG Properties, which owns an adjacent property on K Street, and the developer leased the land back to the church.

This renewed threat to the building led to reconsideration of the 1991 application for historic landmark status. In December 2007 the application was approved by a unanimous vote. After the city turned down a demolition permit request from the Church in July 2008, the Church filed a lawsuit alleging violation of the Free Exercise clause of the First Amendment along with the Religious Freedom Restoration Act and the Religious Land Use and Institutionalized Persons Act of 2000 (RLUIPA). Opponents of the historic landmark designation argued that it violated the 1993 Religious Freedom Restoration Act and subsequent laws by imposing a substantial burden on the church. On May 12, 2009, the District of Columbia approved a demolition permit for the building, citing hardships on the building's owner and the possibility of the congregation's demise if demolition were not approved. The approval was contingent upon the congregation's relocating to another facility close to that of Third Church.

As of October 7, 2013, with all legal issues resolved and with local approval in hand for a planned unit development, with commercial and religious uses, the owners applied for the final demolition permit. Demolition of the church building began on February 24, 2014. The 1971 Third Church building was replaced by an office building. On July 24, 2015, Third Church merged with First Church of Christ, Scientist. First Church moved from its former location in the Adams Morgan neighborhood. First Church now meets in a portion of the building that replaced Third Church at 910 16th St. NW behind a dramatic mirrored glass entrance.

=== Previous history of site ===
This site was the location of the home of U.S. Supreme Court Justice Horace Gray. It was later used as a Christian Science Reading Room.

== See also ==
- List of Brutalist architecture in the United States
- Sixteenth Street Historic District
