= Boston Marriott Long Wharf =

Hotel in Boston, Massachusetts

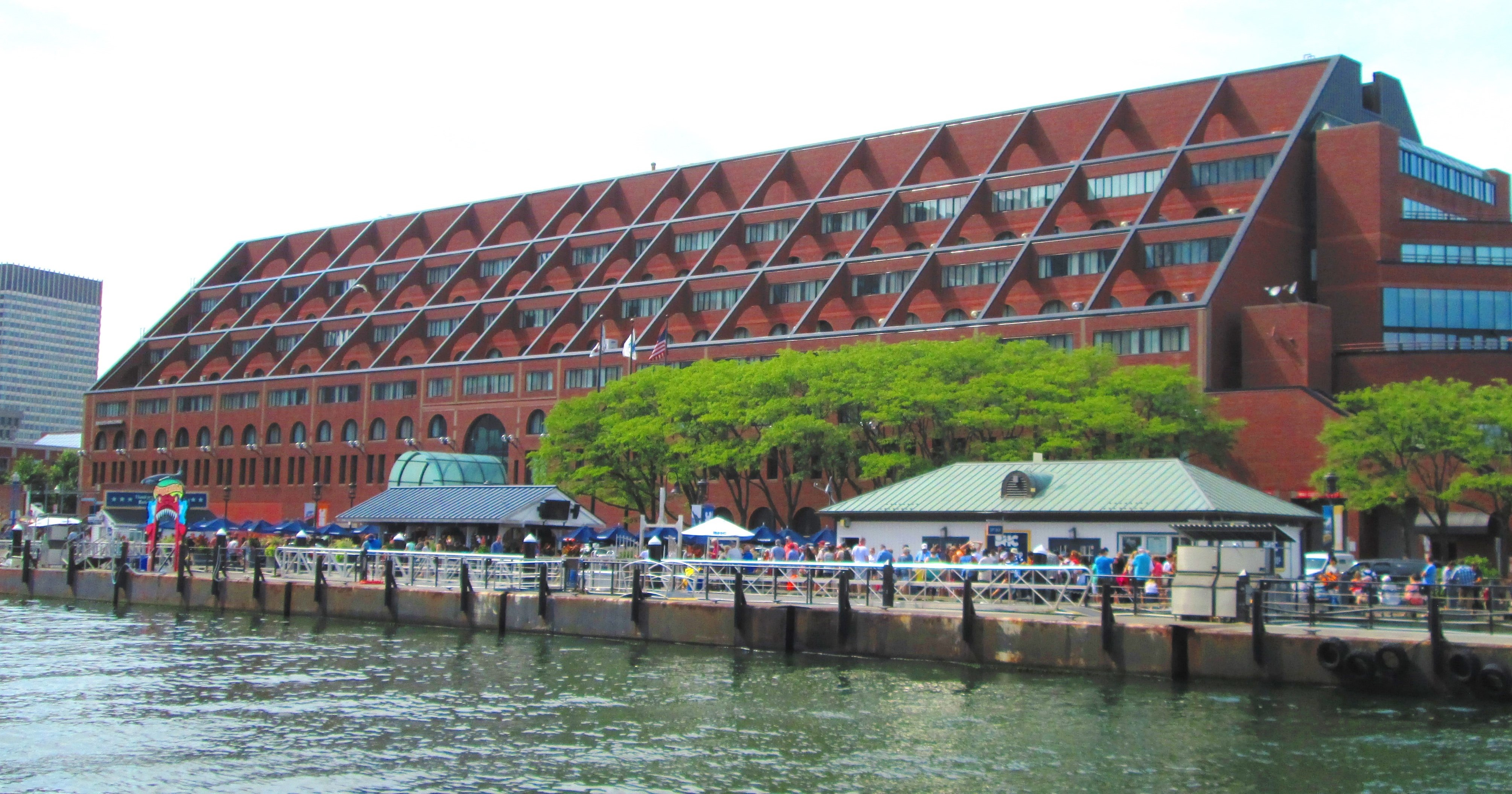
- Pictured in 2017, looking northwest

- Location within Boston

General information
- Location: 296 State Street, Boston, Massachusetts, US
- Coordinates: 42.360208°N 71.050977°W
- Construction started: 1980
- Completed: 1982 (44 years ago)
- Owner: Sunstone Hotel Investors

Design and construction
- Architect: Araldo Cossutta and Associates

Other information
- Number of rooms: 415

Website
- Official website

Boston Marriott Long Wharf is a 415-room hotel in Boston, Massachusetts, United States. Completed in 1982, during Boston's hotel-building boom, it stands at the head of Long Wharf, the city's oldest wharf. It overlooks Boston Harbor just to the south of Christopher Columbus Waterfront Park. The building was designed by Araldo Cossutta and Associates. It reflects the look of the warehouses the building replaced on the wharf. The bolted steel frame of the hotel is designed to withstand earthquakes.

Cossutta's selection as architect was a source of controversy, for Boston mayor Kevin H. White overruled the seven other recommendations of the Boston Redevelopment Authority (BRA), even though each was rated more highly. It is believed White's choice was a favor to his friend Mortimer B. Zuckerman, the project's financier. The executive director of the BRA resigned after the decision.

The hotel is owned by Sunstone Hotel Investors.

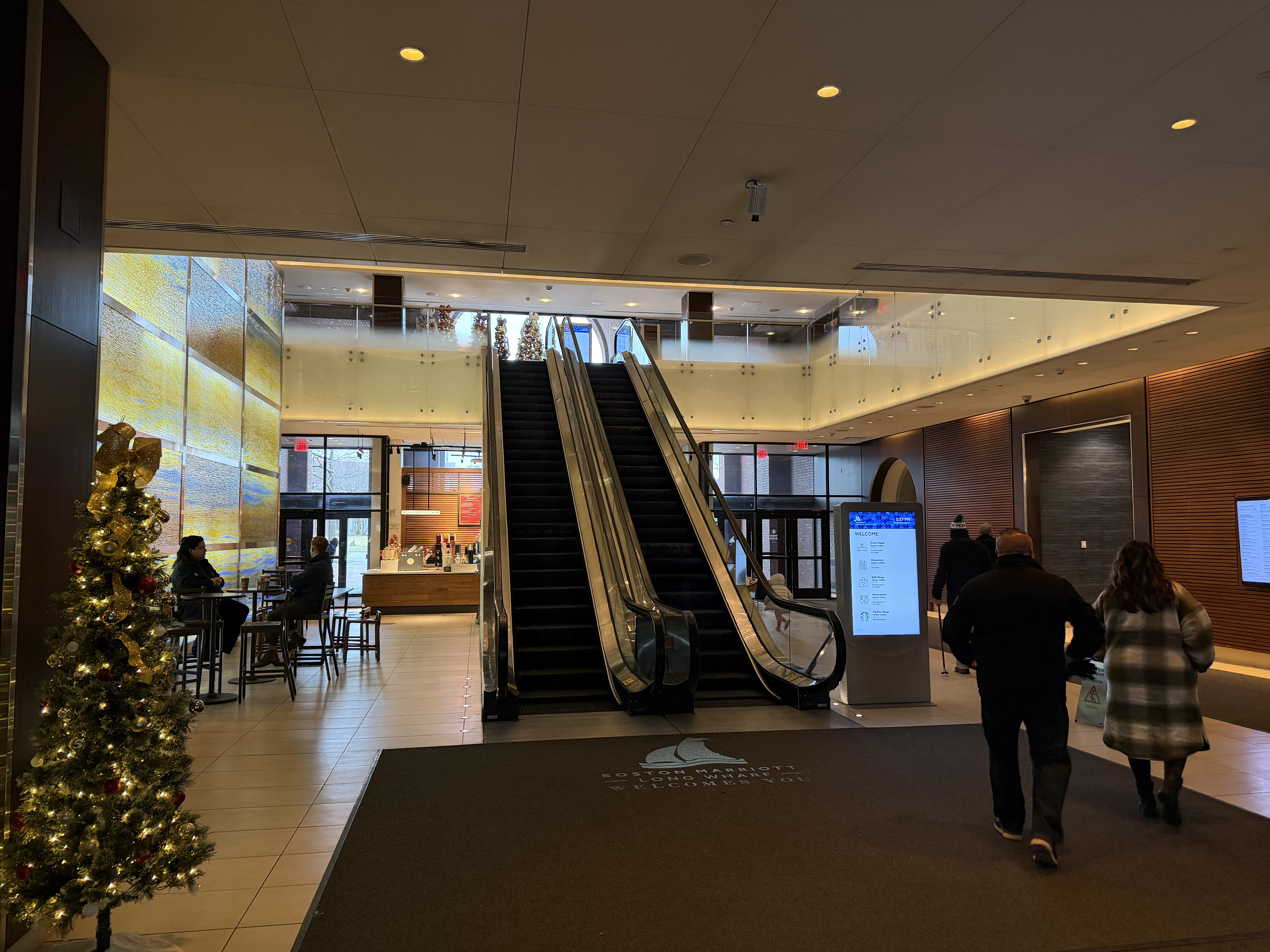
Lobby, first floor, 2025

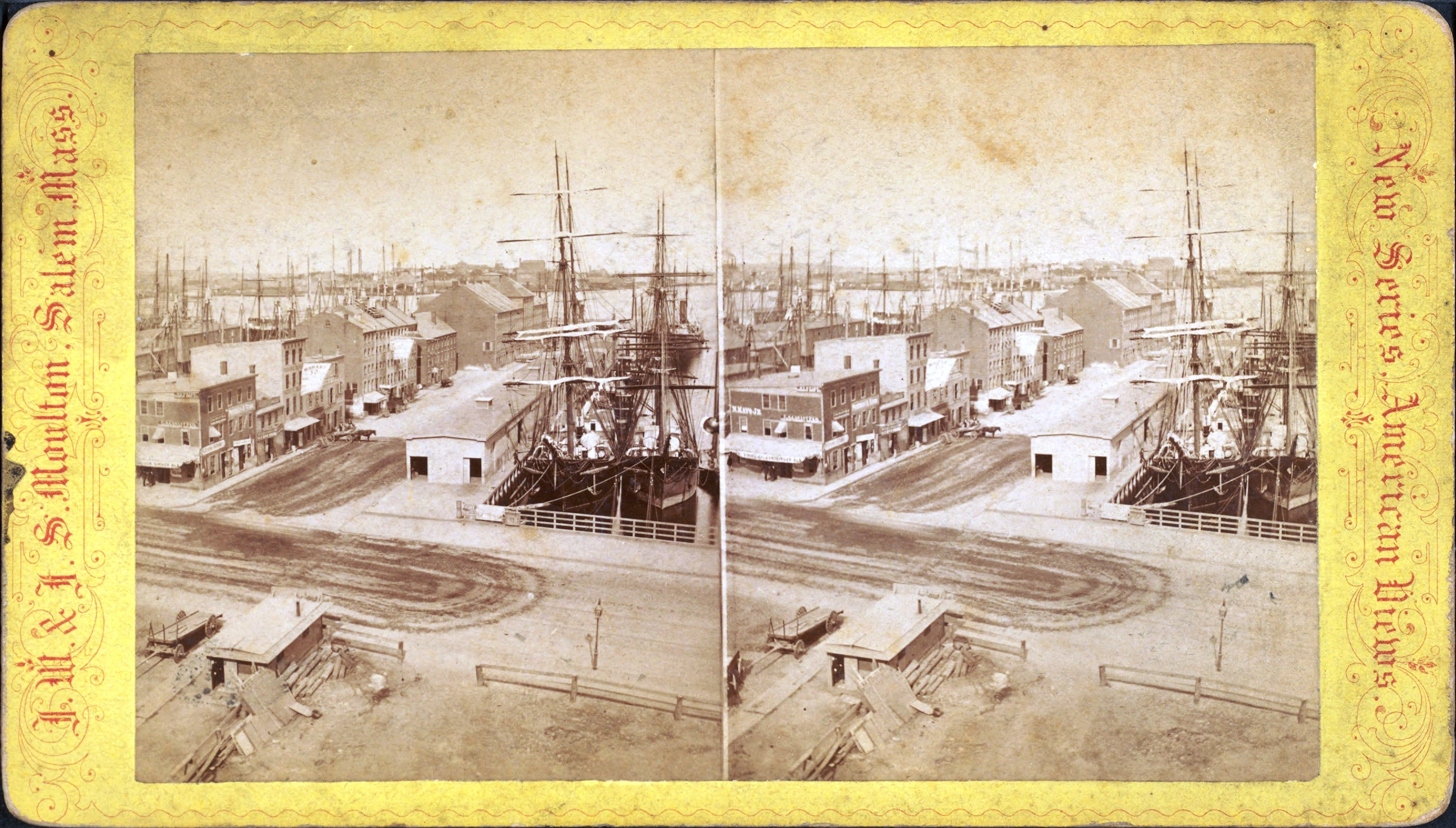
A stereoscopic of Long Wharf c. 1900. The hotel now occupies the lot closest to the street on the left-hand side of the pictures

== See also ==
- List of Marriott hotels
