= George Williamson Crawford =

American lawyer

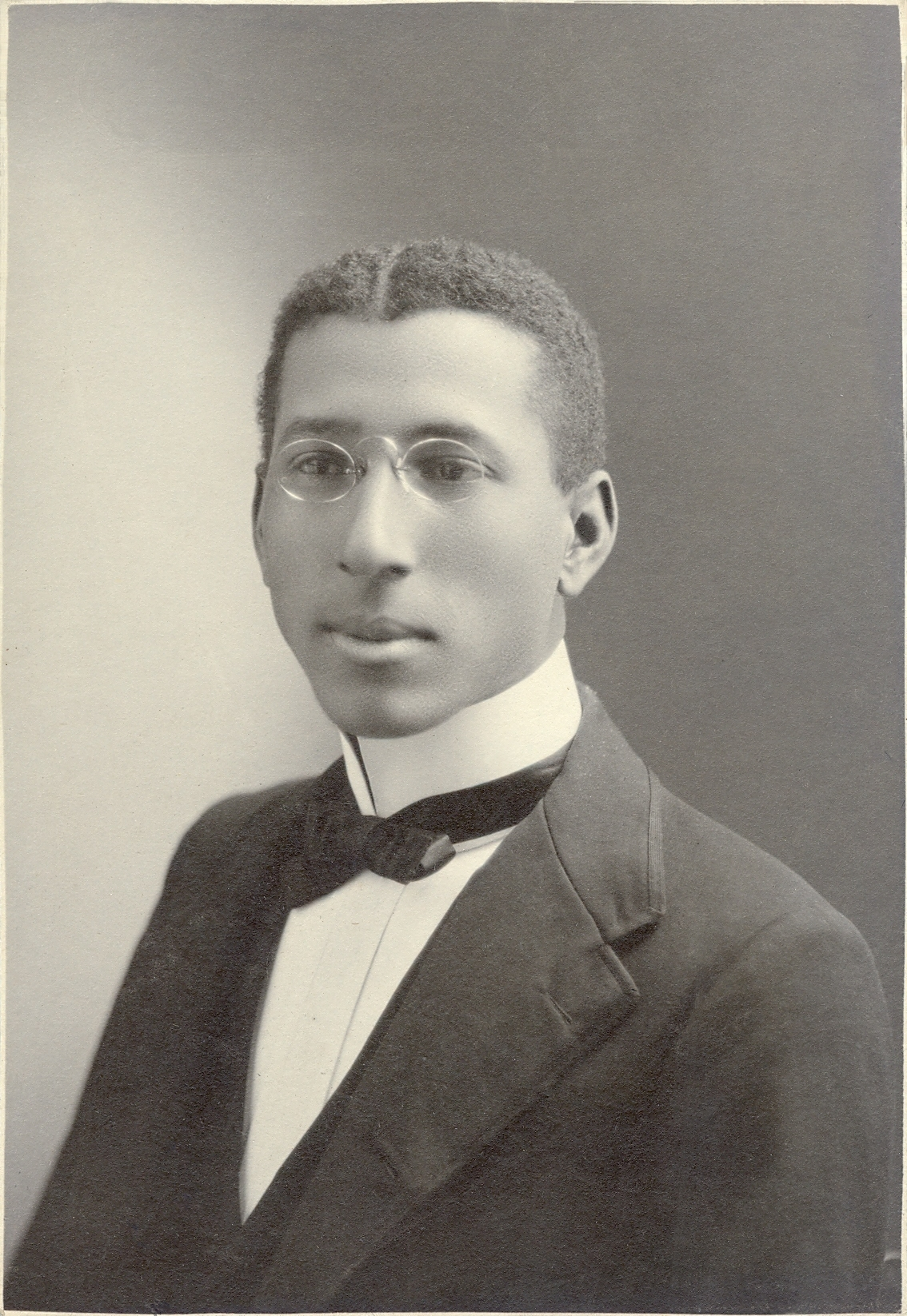
Crawford while a law student at Yale Law School

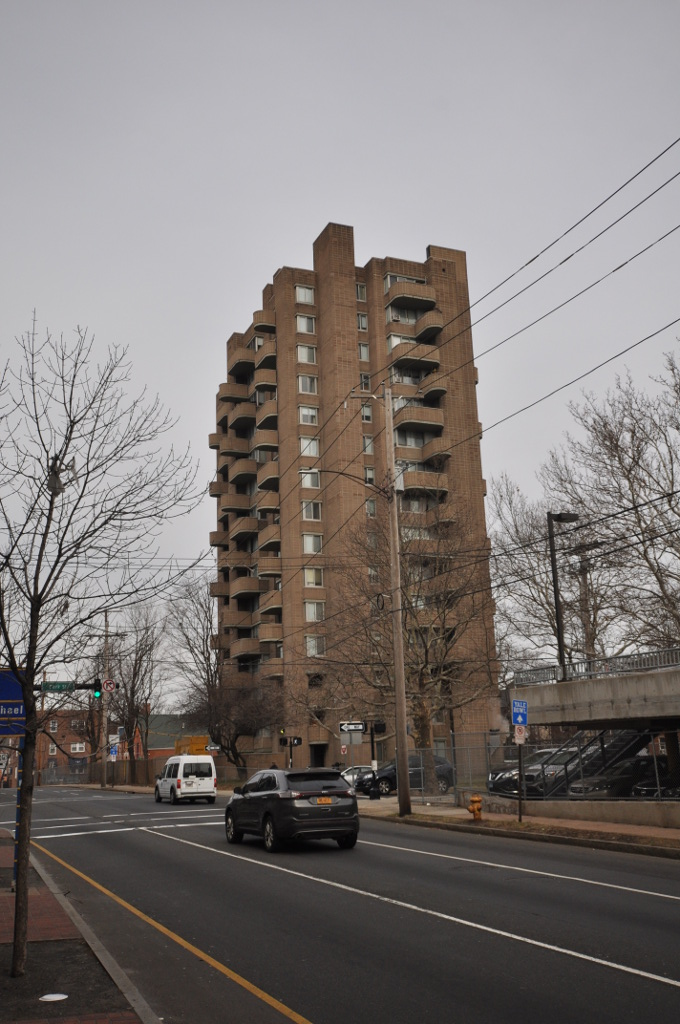
Crawford Manor, in New Haven, Connecticut

George Williamson Crawford (October 21, 1877 – August 1, 1972) was a lawyer, public servant, and an activist for African-American civil rights in New Haven, Connecticut.

== Biography ==
Crawford was born in Tuscaloosa, Alabama, and attended Tuskegee Institute and Talladega College, both historically black colleges. In 1903, Crawford was the second Black graduate from the Yale University Law School, graduating with honors. While at Yale, he earned the Townsend Prize awarded to the best orator at the law school, a prestigious award. The award, which included a prize of $100 ($3,580 today), was given for a speech titled, "Trades, Unionism and Patriotism." He was appointed clerk of the Probate Court of New Haven immediately upon graduation in 1903.

From 1907 until the 1950s, Crawford worked in private practice in New Haven. He was particularly recognized for a high-profile case in which he won the acquittals of thirteen defendants (all white), political leaders of Waterbury, Connecticut who had been charged with criminal breach of the public trust. From 1954 to 1962 he served as corporation counsel for the City of New Haven.

Crawford was also active in the National Association for the Advancement of Colored People, and was one of the founders of the Greater New Haven branch of the organization. He was also an outspoken freemason; he wrote a book on Prince Hall and black freemasonry. At the end of his life, Crawford was recognized as a pioneering black lawyer and civic leader. Roy Wilkins, then executive director of the NAACP, said at a 1966 ceremony dedicating George Crawford Manor, a high-rise residential building for the elderly in New Haven, "It is difficult for a colored man to rise above differences, mistreatments, and inequalities to reach a place such as George Crawford has. He brought all the qualities that make up the American Dream. He served his community—not colored or white—but the whole community." The George W. Crawford Black Bar Association, an organization of black lawyers in Connecticut, was named in his honor.
