= Hawai'i Hochi Building =

Brutalist building in Honolulu, Hawaii

Coordinates: 21°19′26″N 157°52′11″W

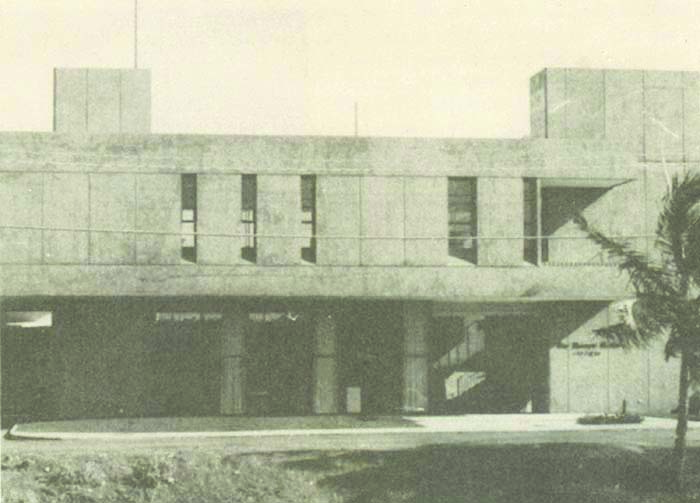
The building in 1975

The Hawai'i Hochi Building is a building in Honolulu, Hawaii. The building was designed by Japanese architect Kenzo Tange as a headquarters for the Hawaii Hochi Newspaper, which occupied it until 2022.

== History ==
The Hawaii Hochi was founded in 1912 to serve Hawaii's Japanese diaspora community. It was originally headquartered in a commercial building on Maunakea and Pauahi streets, and moved to another building near the Port of Honolulu in 1921.

The Hawai'i Hochi commissioned Kenzo Tange to design the paper a new headquarters in 1972. The new building was of an industrial brutalist design.

Following years of declining circulation, the Hochi moved out of the building in 2022. Since then, the building has been unused. Architects Dean Sakamoto and Brigitte Shim with the support of Kamehameha Schools have made proposals to revitalize the structure.
