= Crawford Manor =

Apartment building in New Haven, Connecticut

- George W. Crawford House
- U.S. National Register of Historic Places
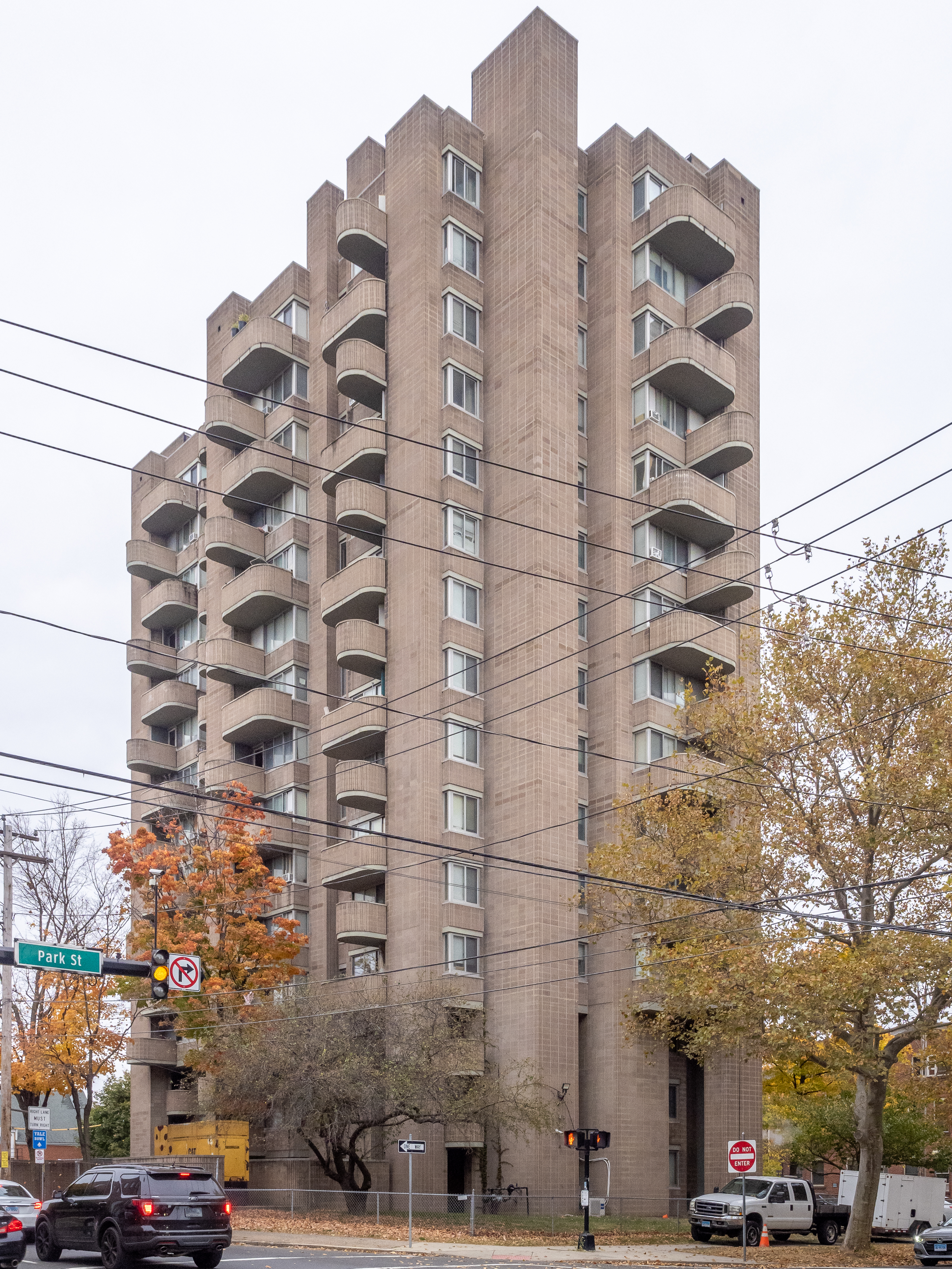

- Location within Connecticut Location within the United States
- Location: 84-96 Park Street, New Haven, Connecticut
- Coordinates: 41°18′24″N 72°56′7″W
- Area: less than one acre
- Built: 1964
- Architect: Paul Rudolph
- Architectural style: Brutalist
- NRHP reference No.: 15000113
- Added to NRHP: April 8, 2015

Crawford Manor, also the George W. Crawford House or George Crawford Towers, is a historic high-rise apartment building at 84-96 Park Street in New Haven, Connecticut. Completed in 1966, the fifteen-story building is a significant mature work of architect Paul Rudolph, and a good local example of Brutalist architecture. The building was listed on the National Register of Historic Places in 2015, and as a non-contributing element to the Dwight Street Historic District in 1983. It is owned by the city of New Haven, which uses it for public housing.

== Description and history ==
Crawford Manor is located on the western fringe of New Haven's downtown area, at the northwest corner of Park Street and MLK Jr. Boulevard. It is set on a small parcel fringed with greenery on the street-facing sides, and parking and the access drive on the west and north sides. The building is fifteen stories in height, with an irregular C-shaped footprint. The building is built with a steel frame and concrete blocks, and is finished with a rusticated concrete finish. Most architectural elements are consist along vertical orientations the entire height of the building, with rhythmic placement of porches (with either rounded or squared outsides), some of which project further than others. Full-height windowless piers separate other visual elements, including windows and porches, from each other. The interior is finished in a manner similar to the exterior, with ribbed rough concrete elements, and poured concrete floors and ceilings. It now houses 109 units, either studio or single bedrooms.

Construction on Crawford Manor was begun in 1964, in order to address a well-documented shortage of public housing for needy senior citizens. It was designed by Paul Rudolph, then the head of the Yale University School of Architecture, and a well-known advocate of what has since been called Brutalist architecture. Originally designed as a thirteen-story building in 1962, it was enlarged due to increased demand. When completed in 1966, the building was by far the largest senior housing facility in the city. It was named in honor of George W. Crawford, the city's recently retired corporation council.

== Reception ==
In 1972’s Learning from Las Vegas, Robert Venturi and Denise Scott Brown use Crawford Manor as an exemplar of “establishment architecture now,” particularly to illustrate the tendency of high modernism to allow the program of a building to distort its form and forego domestic symbolism. They thus label Crawford Manor a duck, "heroic and original," while their Guild House (1963) is a decorated shed, "ugly and ordinary."

== See also ==
- National Register of Historic Places listings in New Haven, Connecticut
