= University Apartments (Chicago) =

- U.S. National Register of Historic Places
- U.S. Historic district – Contributing property
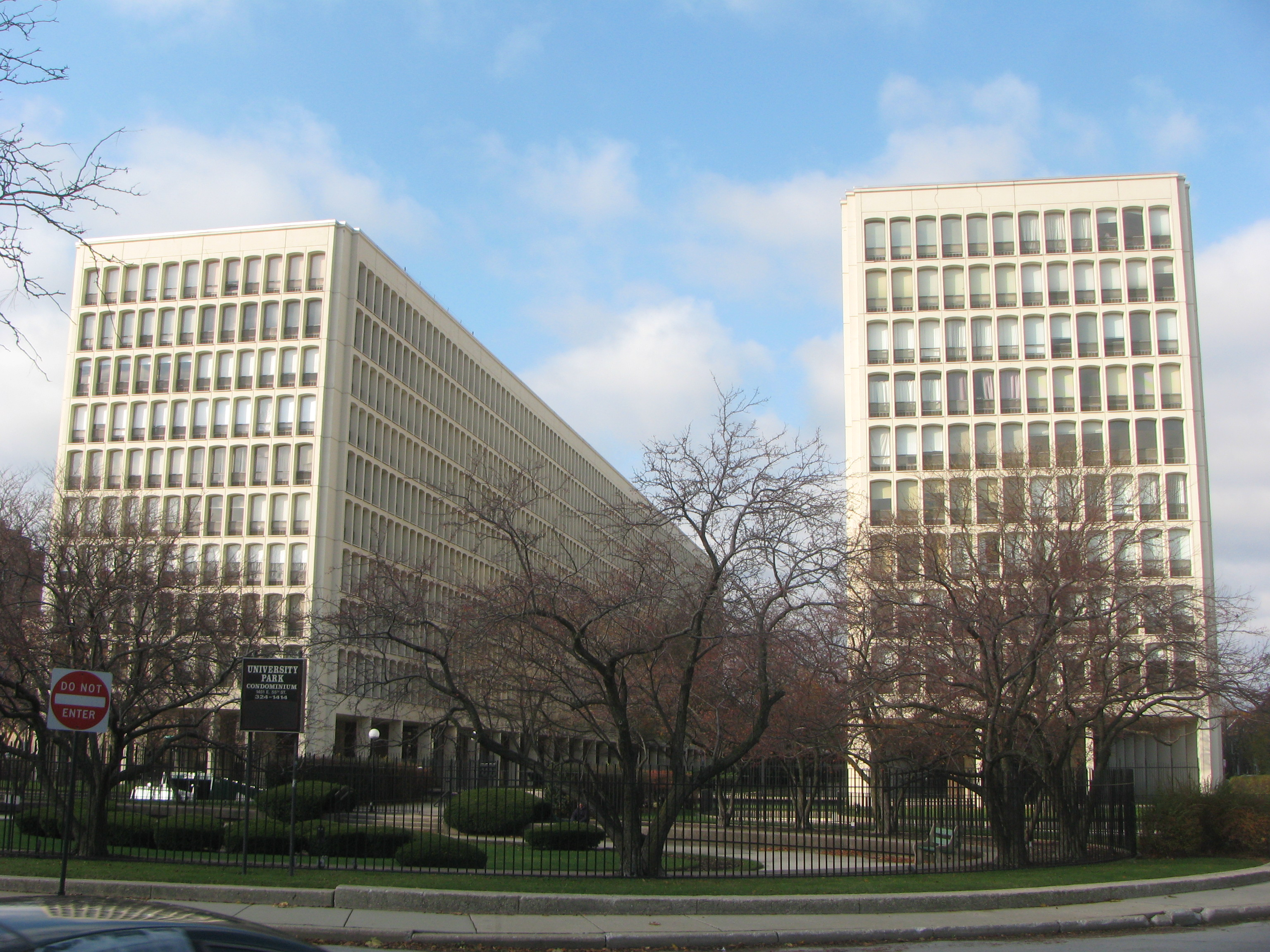
- University Apartments in 2011

- Location within Chicago metropolitan area Location within Illinois Location within the United States
- Location: 1401 - 1451 E. 55th St.; 1400 - 1450 E. 55th Place, Chicago, Illinois
- Coordinates: 41°47′44″N 87°35′28″W
- Area: 16.2 acres (6.6 ha)
- Built: 1961
- Architect: Araldo Cossutta and I. M. Pei of I. M. Pei & Partners; Loewenberg & Loewenberg
- Architectural style: International Style
- Part of: Hyde Park–Kenwood Historic District (ID79000824)
- NRHP reference No.: 04001301
- Added to NRHP: December 22, 2005

The University Apartments, also known as the University Park Condominiums, are a pair of ten-story towers in Chicago, Illinois designed by I. M. Pei and Araldo Cossutta. The project was part of a city initiative to revitalize the residential development in Hyde Park just north of the University of Chicago. Within the Hyde Park neighborhood, they are colloquially known as "Monoxide Island" or "the toasters of Hyde Park."

== History ==
=== Rise and fall of Hyde Park ===
Hyde Park Township was the first suburb of Chicago, Illinois and became one of the area's most desirable communities. Following the opening of the University of Chicago in 1892 and the World's Columbian Exposition in 1893, the neighborhood became known as a retreat for the wealthy intellectual community. Hyde Park, which was annexed in 1889, maintained this reputation until the 1920s. The area around 55th Street and Lake Park Avenue, near where the University Apartments stand today, became a haven for taverns and gambling houses, who were banned from operating near the former fairgrounds. Furthermore, the South Side of Chicago experienced an overall decline in residential construction in the 1920s that continued through the Great Depression. The older buildings that remained in Hyde Park became dilapidated from lack of upkeep. Wealthy and middle class White people fled the area, as the buildings deteriorated, lower earning and poor families moved in and racist views against the increasing number of black people grew in the area.

By the early 1950s, the University of Chicago decided to change the Hyde Park neighborhood. Thomas Wright, the Head of the Chicago Commission on Human Relations, and the Social Order Committee of the 57th Street Meeting of Friends met. Although the university at first refused to engage in any community-building activities, the promotion of chancellor Lawrence A. Kimpton prompted a change in philosophy. The three groups decided to form the South East Chicago Commission in 1952 with the goals of increasing police protection, promoting residential stability, and enforcing building codes. In so doing, the University and neighborhood commission decided that "slum prevention" was their goal. Davarian Baldwin, in his study of the report, summarizes: "physically deteriorating but white‐occupied Hyde Park neighborhood blocks were marked for rehabilitation, while majority black areas became the site targeted for clearance and university acquisition” The organization was able to convince state and federal legislators to provide funding for urban renewal projects.

=== Project Hyde Park A ===
The Chicago Land Clearance Commission was created to acquire real estate and begin land clearance for blighted areas in Hyde Park. One of these areas was Project Hyde Park A, a 42.7-acre (17.3 ha) area of Hyde Park between 57th Street, Kimbark Avenue, 54th Place, and the Illinois Central Railroad right-of-way. A redevelopment plan for this area was approved in January 1955, and funding was secured the next month. Most of Hyde Park A was designated for row houses and single-family houses. Over 15,000 residents of Hyde Park were relocated when the substandard buildings were demolished. New construction began in August 1958, led by the University Apartments.

William Zeckendorf of Webb and Knapp commissioned architect I. M. Pei to design two ten-story apartment buildings for the project; Araldo Cossutta was the design associate within Pei's firm. The project was designed in collaboration with Loewenberg & Loewenberg. Zeckendorf and Pei had worked together since 1948 and had previously designed other large-scale housing developments, including the Kips Bay Towers in New York City. Pei applied several of his specialized techniques and ideas to the building. The University Apartments followed the Kips Bay idea of using two rectangular slabs to protect and enclose a park. Pei's Denver Hilton project in 1958 proved that frame windows could be made strong enough to support a building. Pei developed a special lightweight concrete for this purpose. This eliminated the need for steel framing; this freed funds for interior projects such as improved lighting and increased interior space. Pei worked with Harry Weese, who had been commissioned to design row houses for the same project, so that their buildings would relate to each other.

The apartment complex was converted to condominiums in 1978. To enhance security, a wrought iron security fence and two security lobbies were added in the ensuing decade. This closed off the central court, which had been used as a public pedestrian walkway. On December 22, 2005, the buildings were recognized by the National Park Service with a listing on the National Register of Historic Places, citing their contributions to the redevelopment of Hyde Park and their significant architecture. It is a non-contributing property to the Hyde Park – Kenwood Historic District, as it was only eighteen years old at the time of the designation.

== Architecture ==
The University Apartments are on a traffic island on 55th Street stretching two-and-a-half blocks between Harper Avenue on the east and Ridgewood Court on the West. The towers are designed with a load-bearing exterior concrete screen wall. Windows are deeply inset. The buildings are designed so that it looks shorter than its actual length. The University Apartments are in a high density residential community; most of the buildings immediately surrounding the complex were part of Weese's rowhouse project and were built around the same time. Trees line the outer perimeter of the site. The towers, each 469 × 55 × 94 feet (143 × 17 × 29 m), are separated by an 85-foot (26 m) wide central garden court. The garden court has a large pool with a fountain and two rectangular planter beds. The design is consistent with the International Style and is heavily influenced by Le Corbusier.

Each of the towers has a one-floor lobby and nine residential floors; each has 270 apartments. The towers are stabilized with large rectangular pillars rising from subterranean 469 by 214 feet (143 m × 65 m) concrete platforms. A 220 car parking garage, four coin laundries, storage, and utility areas are in the basement. Each floor has twelve windows on the east and west and 108 on the north and south ends. Windows measure 41 inches (1,000 mm) across including a narrow aluminum frame and are separated by 8-inch (200 mm) columns. Windows are 72 inches (1,800 mm) high and have a 3-inch (76 mm) arch at the top. Each level extends 8 feet (2.4 m) from floor to ceiling. Seventy-two studio apartments are each roughly 420 square feet (39 m^{2}), 102 one-bedroom units are either 468 square feet (43.5 m^{2}) or 606 square feet (56.3 m^{2}), and 90 two-bedroom units are 774 square feet (71.9 m^{2}), 861 square feet (80.0 m^{2}), or 893 square feet (83.0 m^{2}). Each tower has two pairs of elevators. The lobbies are accessed by 12 by 12 feet (3.7 m × 3.7 m) foyers on the north and south ends of the buildings. Each bank of elevators are located near the entrances. In 1988, security stations were installed on the north entrance of the 1451 building and the south entrance on the 1400 building.
