= Araldo Cossutta =

American architect

- Araldo Cossutta in Chicago in 2010. The building is part of the University Gardens Apartments.
- Born: Araldo Alfred Cossutta; January 11, 1925; Krk, Kingdom of Serbs, Croats and Slovenes
- Died: February 24, 2017 (aged 92); New York, New York, United States
- Education: University of Belgrade 1946; École des Beaux-Arts 1951; Harvard University 1952
- Occupation: Architect
- Practice: Michael Hare & Assoc. 1952–1955; I. M. Pei & Partners 1955–1973; Cossutta & Associates 1973–2017
- Buildings: Christian Science Center, Boston; Tour du Crédit Lyonnais, Lyon

Araldo Cossutta (January 11, 1925 – February 24, 2017) was an architect who worked primarily in the United States. He worked at the firm I. M. Pei & Partners from 1956 to 1973. I. M. Pei has been among the most honored architects in the world. Cossutta was Pei's associate and ultimately his partner in the first phase of Pei's career. He was responsible for some of the firm's best-known designs from that era, including three that have received "landmark" designations in recent years. In 1973 he and Vincent Ponte left Pei's firm to form Cossutta & Ponte, which ultimately became Cossutta and Associates. The new firm designed the Credit Lyonnais Tower in Lyon, France (1977) and the Tower at Cityplace (1988) in Dallas, Texas, among other commissions.

== Early career ==
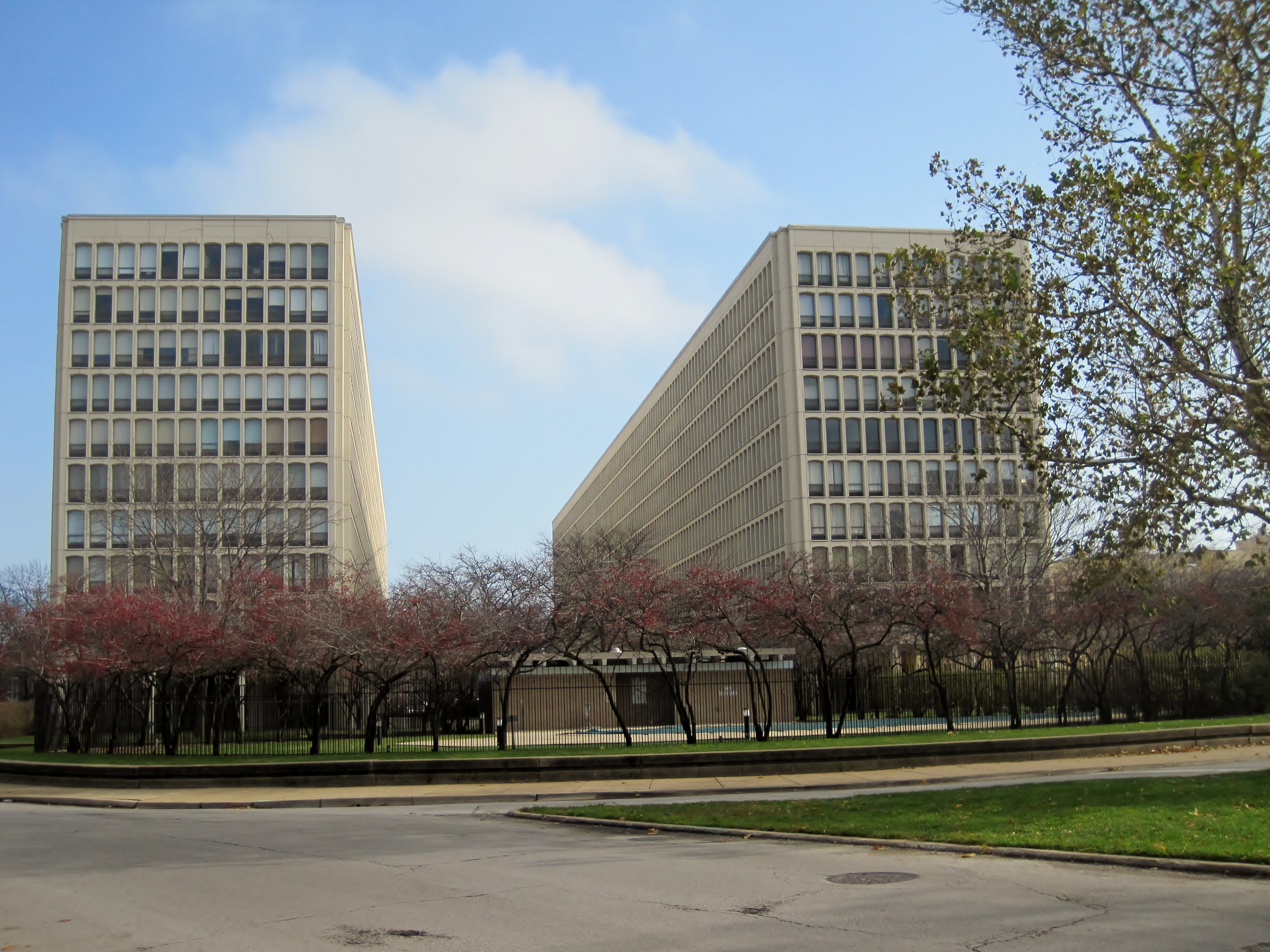
The University Gardens Apartments (1961) were one of the first commissions executed by Araldo Cossutta for Pei & Associates, and were part of an urban renewal plan for Hyde Park, a Chicago neighborhood and the location of the University of Chicago. The buildings are now listed in the National Register of Historic Places.

Cossutta was born on the island of Krk, which was then in the Kingdom of Serbs, Croats, and Slovenes (and subsequently in Yugoslavia and then Croatia). He was educated at the University of Belgrade, the École des Beaux-Arts in Paris, France, and Harvard University in Cambridge, Massachusetts. In 1949 Cossutta worked in the atelier (the studio) of Le Corbusier, who "arguably had more of an influence on the form of the modern world than any other architect." He received a master's degree from Harvard in 1952. From 1952 to 1955, he worked for Michael Hare and Associates. In 1955, Pei founded his own architectural firm, I. M. Pei and Associates. Like Cossutta, Pei had been profoundly influenced by Le Corbusier; Pei has written that the "two days with Le Corbusier, or 'Corbu' as we used to call him, were probably the most important days in my architectural education." Cossutta became an associate in Pei's new firm shortly after its creation. Cossutta's designs for Pei's firm include the Denver Hilton Hotel (1960), University Gardens Apartments in Chicago, Illinois (1961), the north and south buildings of the L'Enfant Plaza complex in Washington, D.C. (1968), the Third Church of Christ, Scientist in Washington, D.C. (1971), and the Christian Science Center in Boston, Massachusetts (1973).

== Brutalism and the Christian Science Center ==
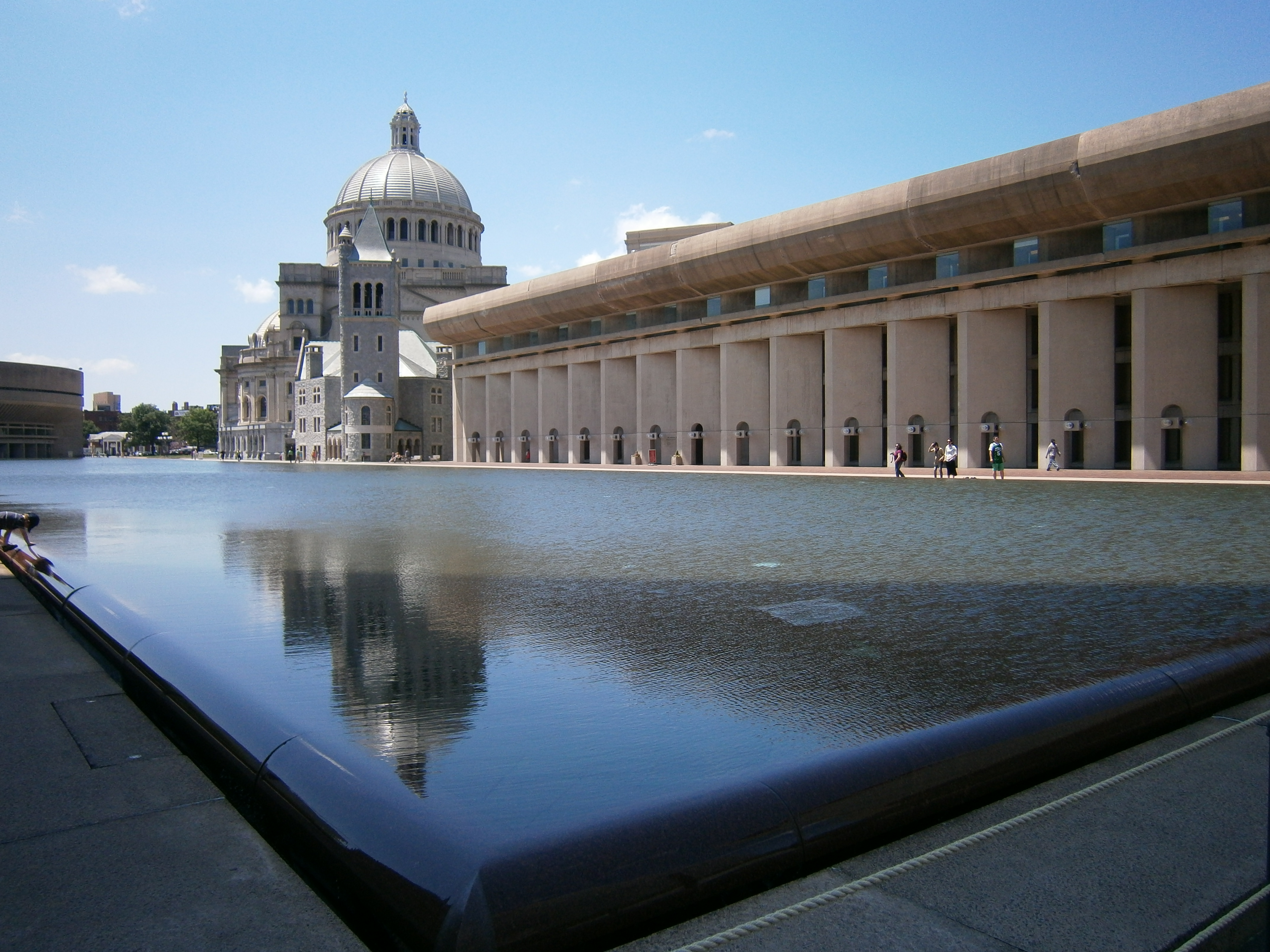
Christian Science Center (1973), Boston, Massachusetts. The reflecting pool and the Colonnade Building (right) date from the 1970s; the domed Mother Church (center left) dates from 1894 to 1906.

Architecture critics include Cossuta's buildings from the 1960s and 1970s as examples of the Brutalist architecture that flowered in that period. The name itself refers to the typical use of raw concrete (béton brut in French). One of the seminal buildings for the New Brutalism was Le Corbusier's Unité d'Habitation (1952) in Marseille, France. Benjamin Flowers writes that, "In appearance, New Brutalism is characterized often, but not exclusively, by rugged and dramatic concrete surfaces and monumental sculptural forms." Among the most recognized of Cossutta's designs is the Christian Science Center (1973) in Boston. The Center incorporated the original Mother Church buildings (1894-1906), the eight-story Christian Science Publishing House (1934), and three newly constructed buildings. The five buildings were incorporated into a large plaza with a 670-foot (200 m) long reflecting pool. The new buildings were the Colonnade Building with its sculpted, raw concrete colonnade, a 28-story office building, and the quarter-round Sunday School Building with its 500-seat auditorium.

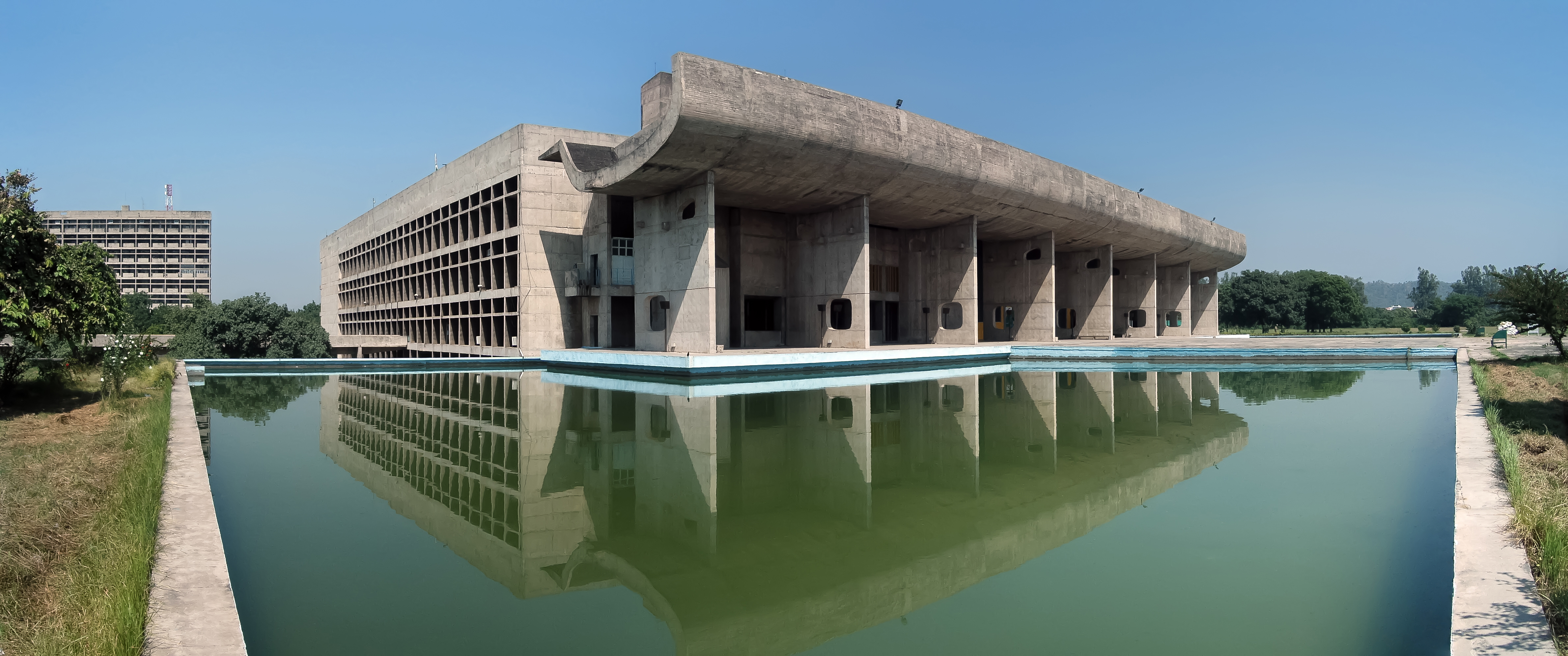
Architecture critics have noted that Cossutta's designs reflect Le Corbusier's buildings in Chandigarh, India (1953–1963).

The plaza of the Christian Science Center was declared an historic landmark by the City of Boston in 2011. The report noted that the center is "a singular achievement of civic design in the Modernist period. The Pei/Cossutta plan made the Christian Science Center one of the most monumental – and successful – public spaces in Boston." Michael Kubo and his colleagues have written that this Brutalist design "shows how, with proper care and stewardship, these buildings can be wonderful participants in an active urban setting. At their best, they are powerful monuments of an ethic inspired by, but critical of, its Modernist past — an ethic that sought authenticity for its time and embraced the future wholeheartedly." The Christian Science Center has been changed fairly little since its construction around 1970, and is an example of a large public space that has been maintained by a private organization. Significant modifications to the design have been proposed by the Church.

== Third Church of Christ, Scientist ==
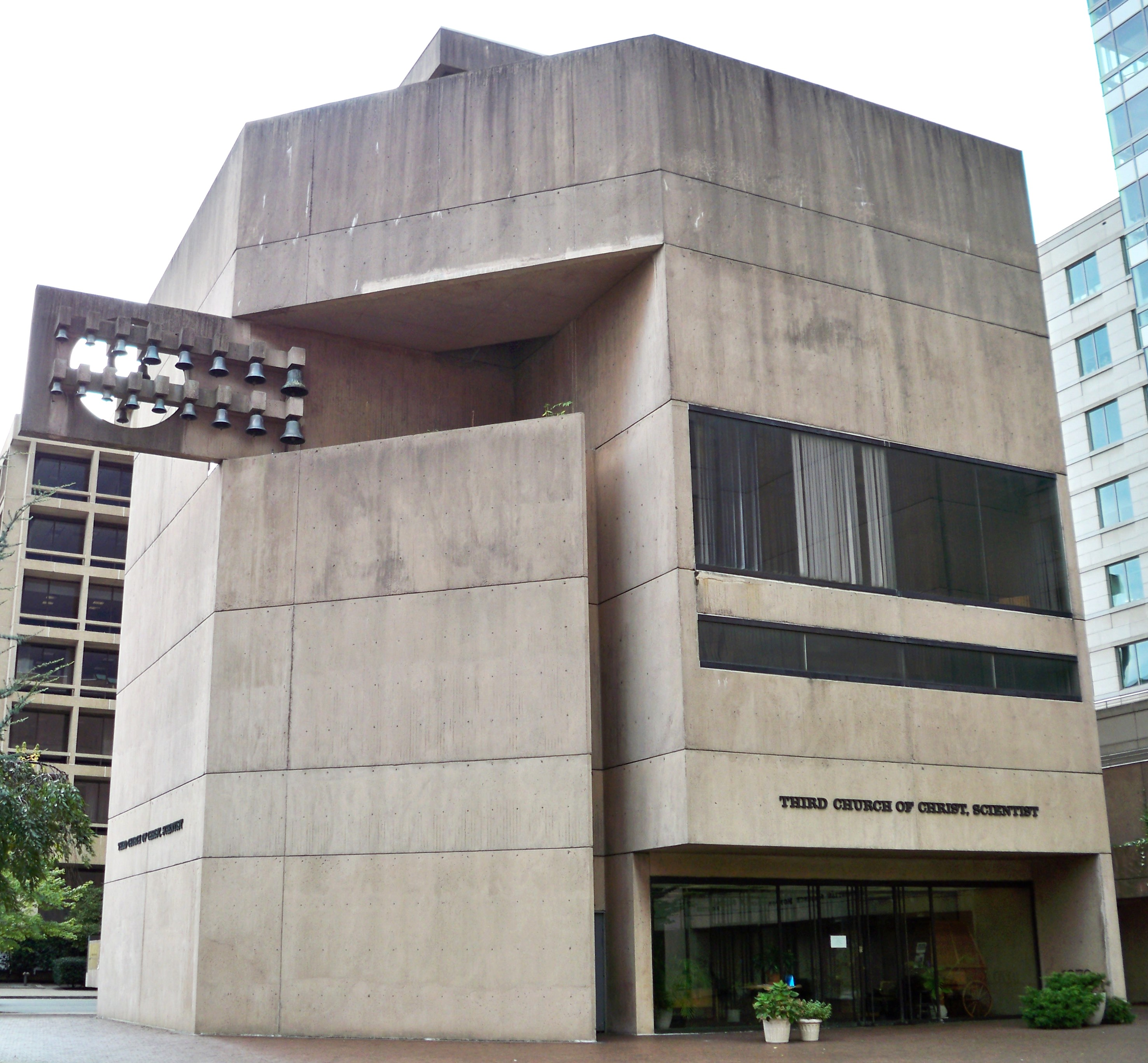
Plaza entrance to the Third Church of Christ, Scientist (Washington, 1971; demolished 2014)

Cossutta's design for the Third Church of Christ, Scientist (Washington, D. C., 1971) incorporates an octagonal church building with a raw concrete facade, an eight-story office building, and the plaza lying between the buildings. The design is also considered Brutalist, and has been controversial since the building's construction. While the building won an "Award for Excellence in Architecture" from the Metropolitan Washington Board of Trade, the Washington Post architecture critic Wolf von Eckardt was quite negative about the bunker-like exterior of the church and its disruption of the 19th century scale of this section of Washington, which is close to the White House. The design and the early criticism of it were the subjects of an entire chapter in a 1988 book about Washington's architecture by Sue Kohler and Jeffrey Carson. These authors admired the auditorium, which they characterized as "exceptionally dynamic and powerful", and wrote that Cossutta's arrangement of the church, a paired office building constructed at the same time, and the plaza was "a tour de force".

About 1990 the congregation of the Church began to seek a buyer for the property, which they felt had become unsuitable. The probable consequence would have been demolition of the church building. In an effort to save the building, in 1991 two independent groups joined to file an application for historic landmark status for the church. This application was ultimately approved by a unanimous vote sixteen years later in 2007. An application to demolish the building to permit redevelopment of the property was then denied in 2008. The conflict between the congregation's and the Christian Science Church's right to control the property, and the buildings' status as an important exemplar of brutalist ecclesiastical architecture, continued and attracted national attention.

A demolition permit was finally granted in 2009 despite the church building's landmark status. The granting of the permit acknowledged that the building had become a threat to the congregation's vitality, having become oversized compared to the congregation's membership and expensive to maintain. The structure was razed in 2014; Araldo Cossutta was philosophical about its destruction, saying “My work should not be fossilized, but when you replace it, make sure the replacement is an even greater gift.”

== Honors ==
The Denver Hilton Hotel, for which Cossutta and Pei were the lead designers, received an American Institute of Architects (AIA) National Honor Award in 1961, among other honors. In 1968, the firm I. M. Pei & Partners received the AIA Architecture Firm Award; Cossutta was then a partner in the firm, and had been with the firm essentially since its founding in 1955. In 1974 Cossutta was elected a Fellow of the American Institute of Architects, and in 2010 he was elected as a foreign member of the French Académie d'architecture. The Christian Science Center (1973) won the 1975 Harleston Parker Medal. Three of Cossuta's designs, all executed while he was with I. M. Pei's firm, have been granted landmark status: University Gardens Apartments (1961) was entered on the National Register of Historic Places in 2007, the Third Church of Christ, Scientist was listed as an historic landmark in the District of Columbia in 2008, and the plaza of the Christian Science Center was designated an historic landmark by the City of Boston in 2011.

In 1994, Cossutta endowed the Araldo A. Cossutta Annual Prize for Design Excellence at Harvard University.

== Gallery of projects ==
The application for historic landmark status for Third Church of Christ, Scientist, includes a list of Cossutta's principal design projects; the list was based on one furnished to the application's authors by Cossutta & Associates. This gallery shows photographs of some of the completed projects.

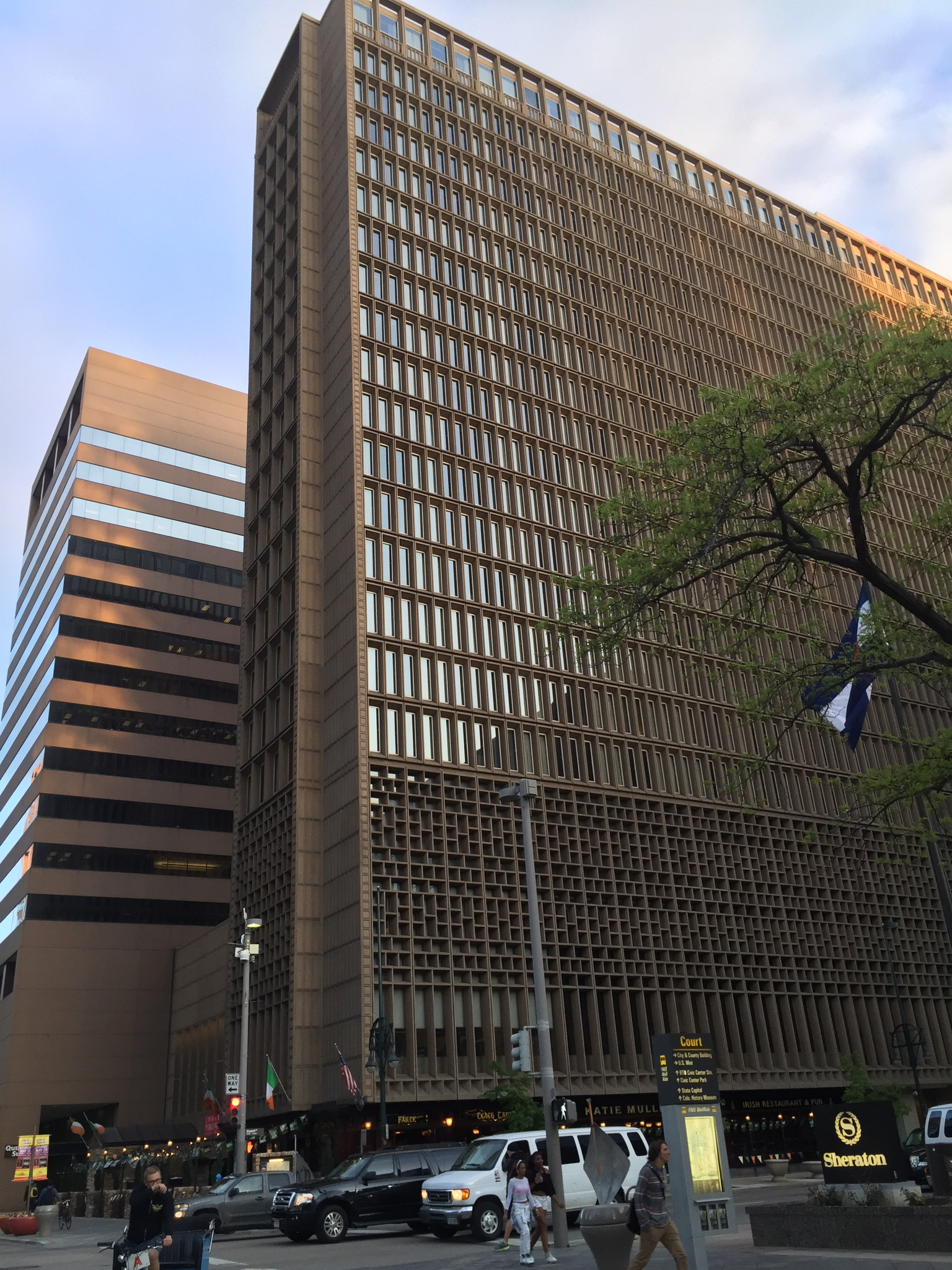
"Tower Building" of the Denver Sheraton, this building was built in 1960 as the Denver Hilton Hotel, and was honored in 1961 by a National Honor Award of the American Institute of Architects (AIA).

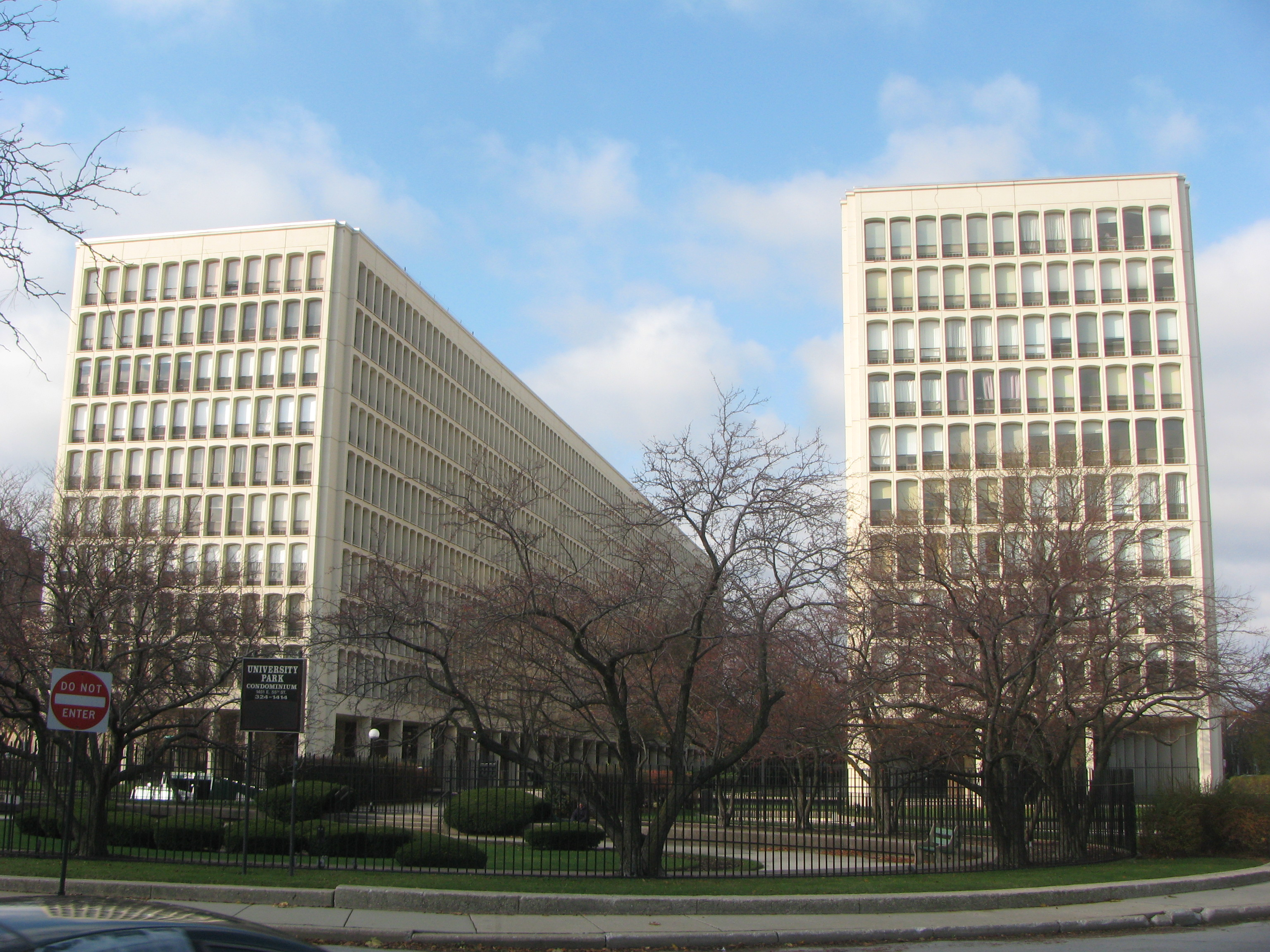
University Gardens Apartments (1961) in Chicago, Illinois.

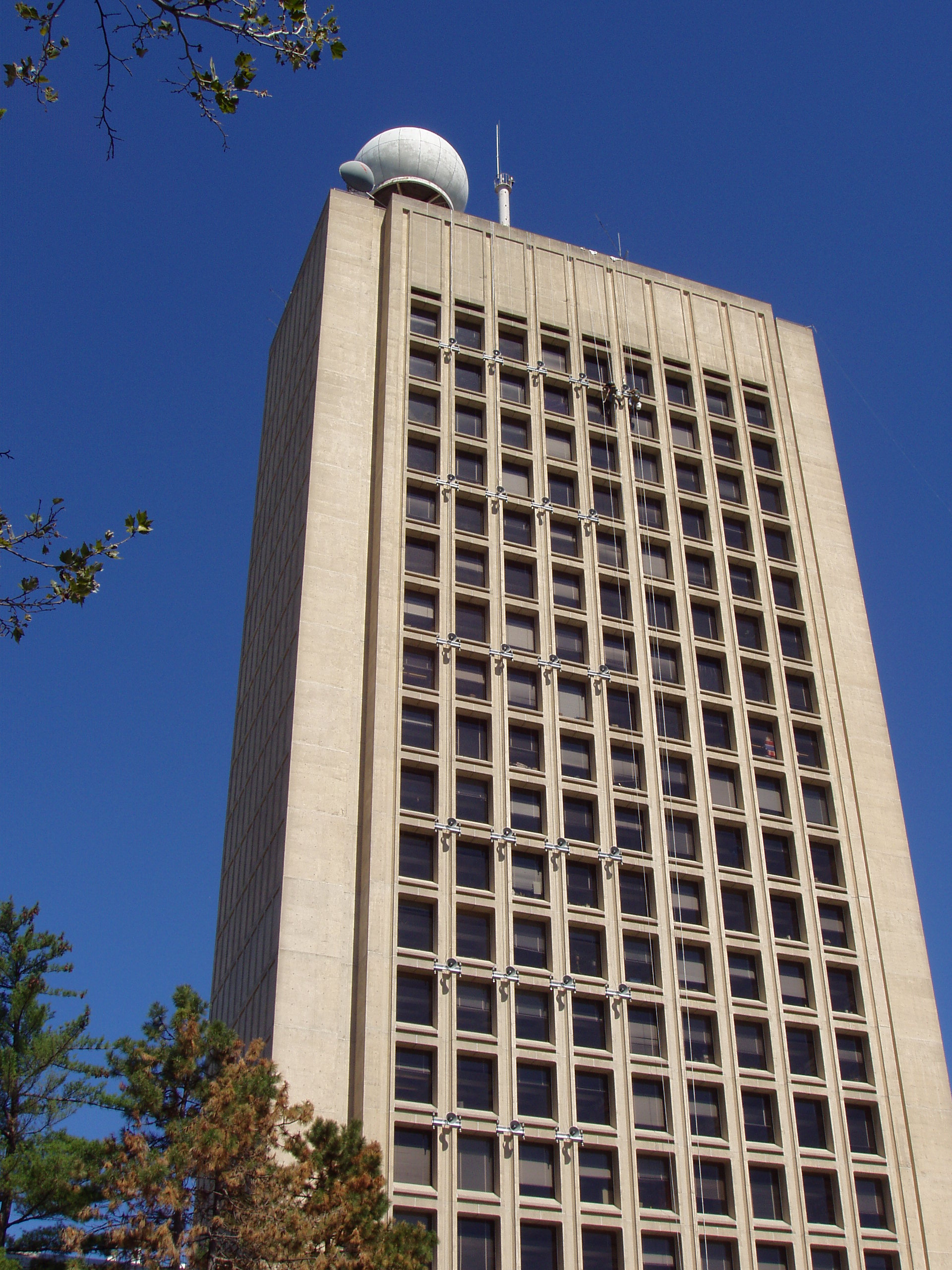
Cecil and Ida Green Center for Earth Sciences (1964), Cambridge, Massachusetts.

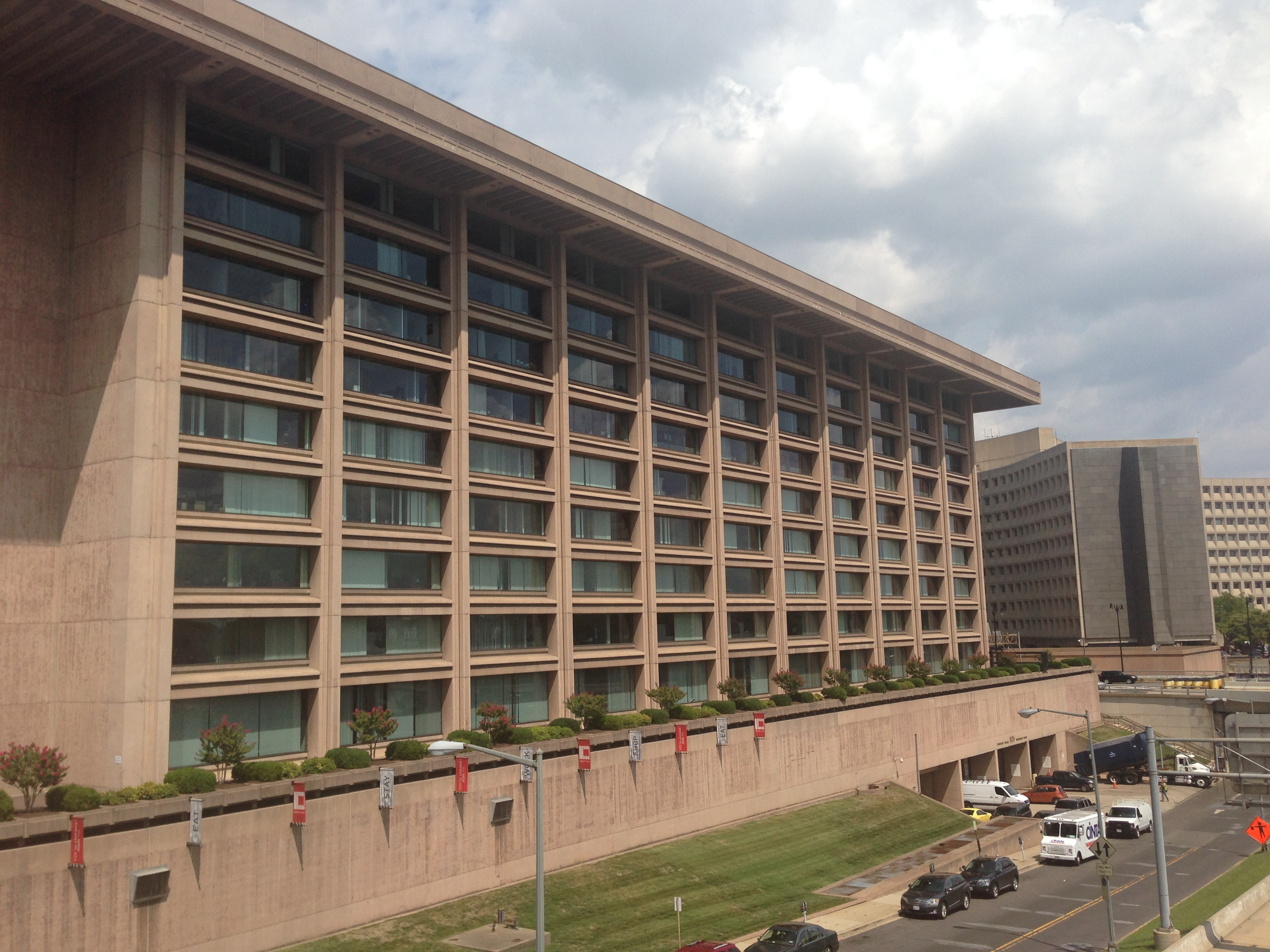
South Building (1968) of the L'Enfant Plaza complex, Washington, District of Columbia. The North Building (1968), also designed by Cossutta, is nearly identical.

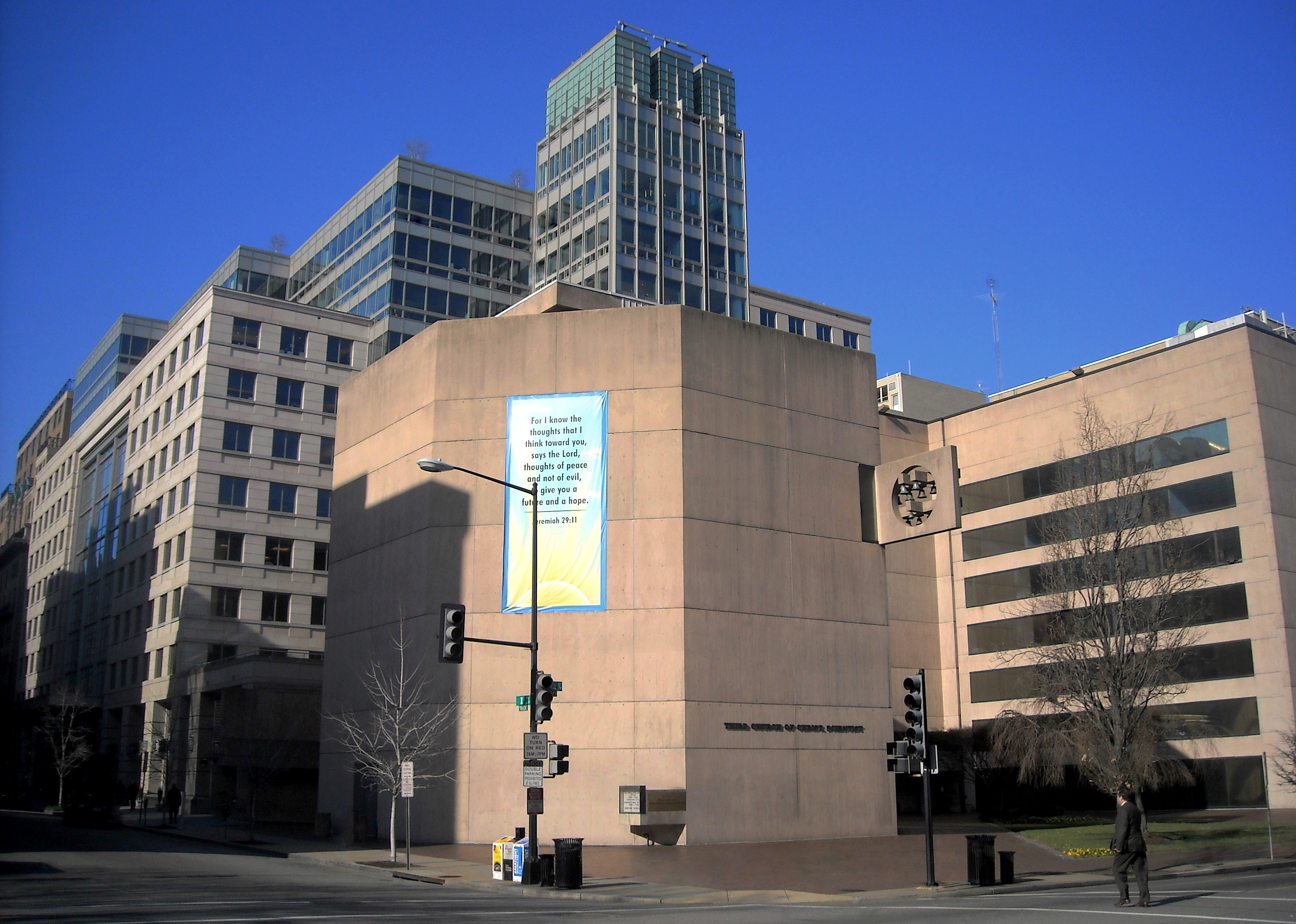
Third Church of Christ, Scientist/Christian Science Monitor Building (1971; demolished 2014), Washington, District of Columbia.

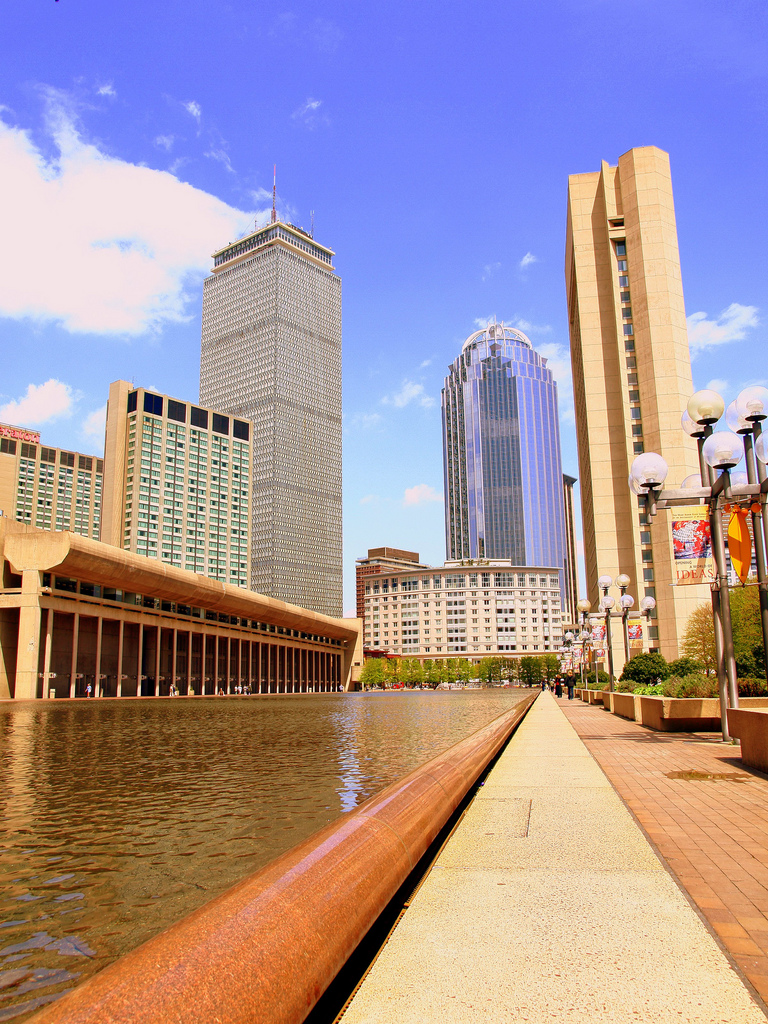
Christian Science Center (1973), Boston, Massachusetts. The reflection pool, colonnaded building at the left, and the 28-story office building to the right belong to the center.

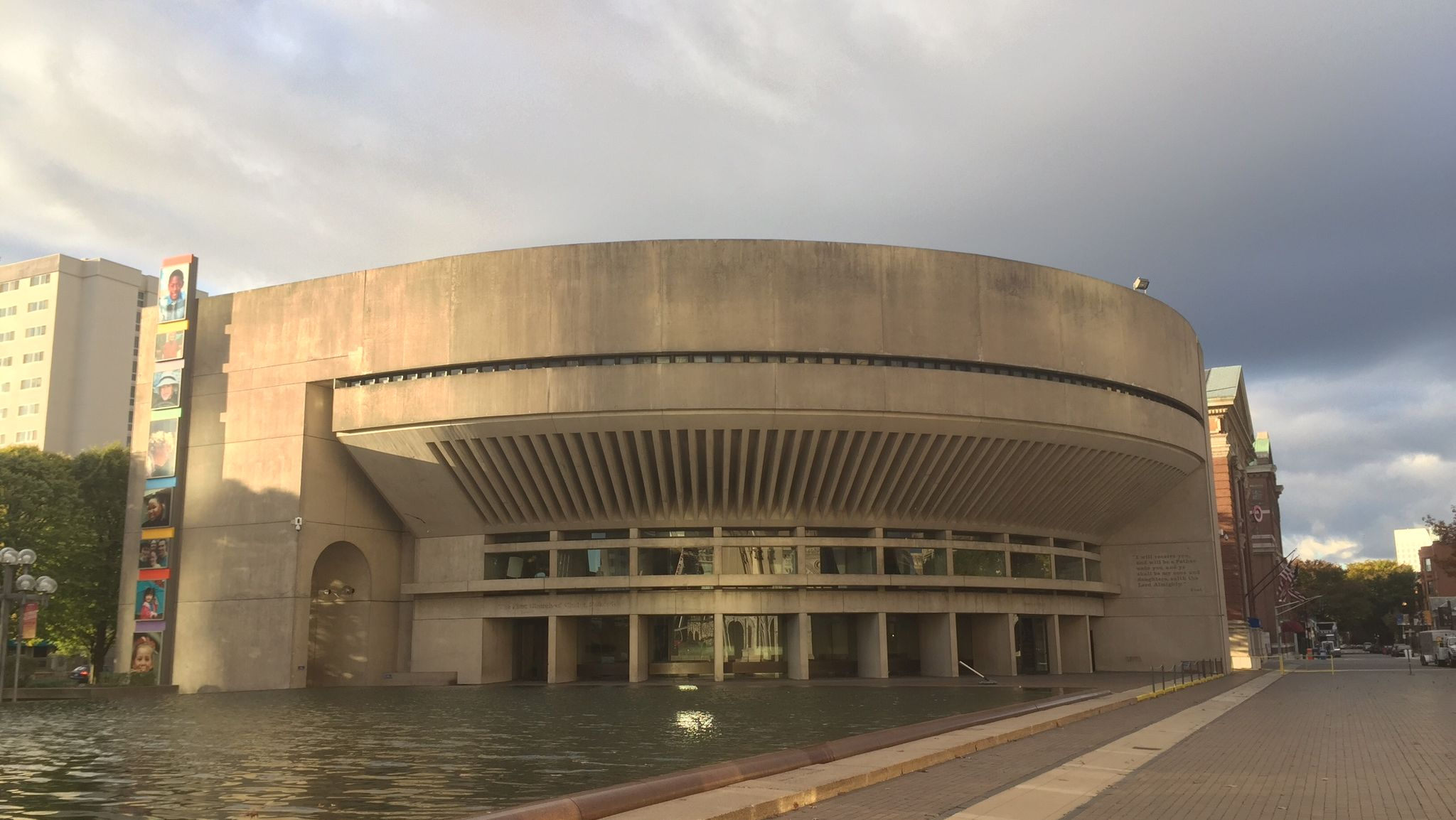
Reflection Hall (1973) of the Christian Science Center in Boston, Massachusetts.

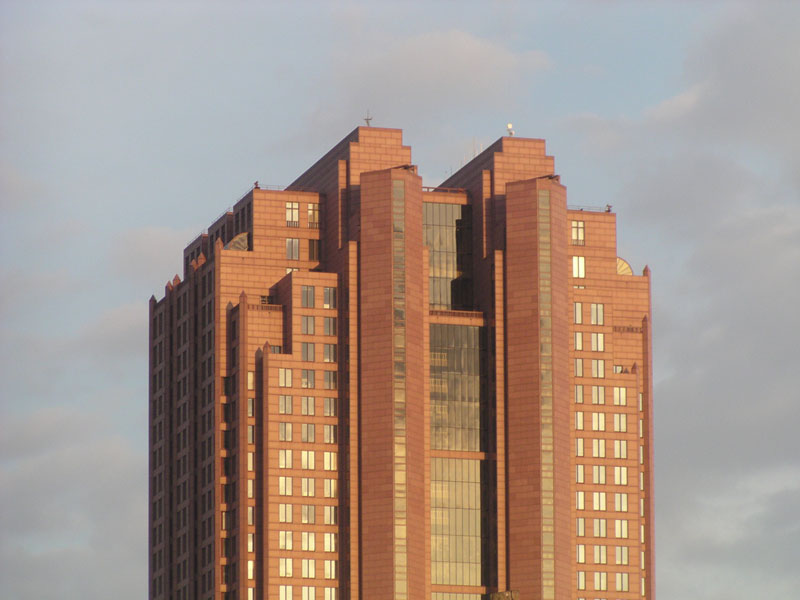
Tower at Cityplace (1988), Dallas, Texas.

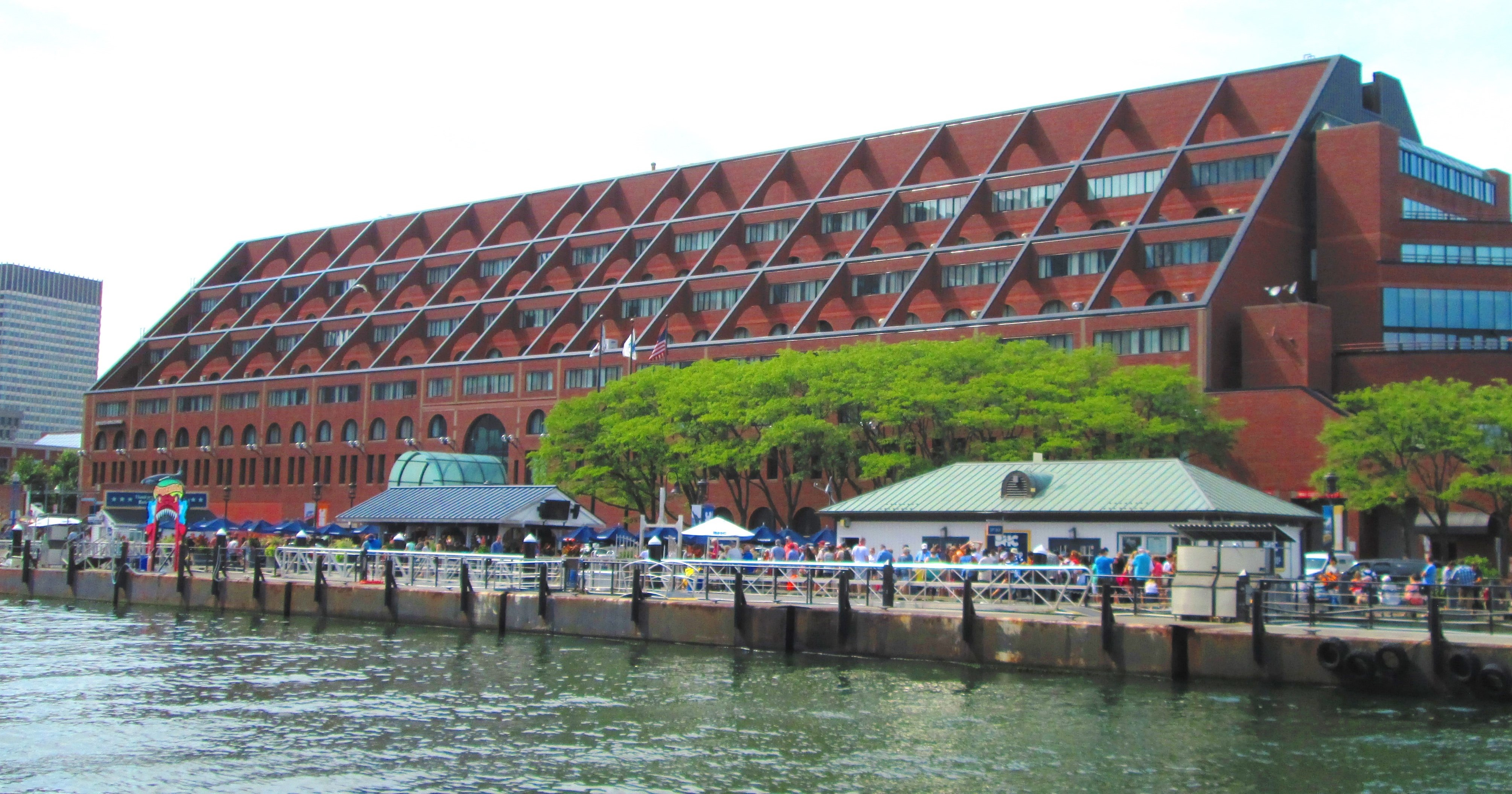
Boston Marriott Long Wharf (1982), Boston, Massachusetts.
