= St. Jude Church (New York City) =

Church in Manhattan, New York

Coordinates: 40°51′46.46″N 73°55′11.08″W

Church of St. Jude
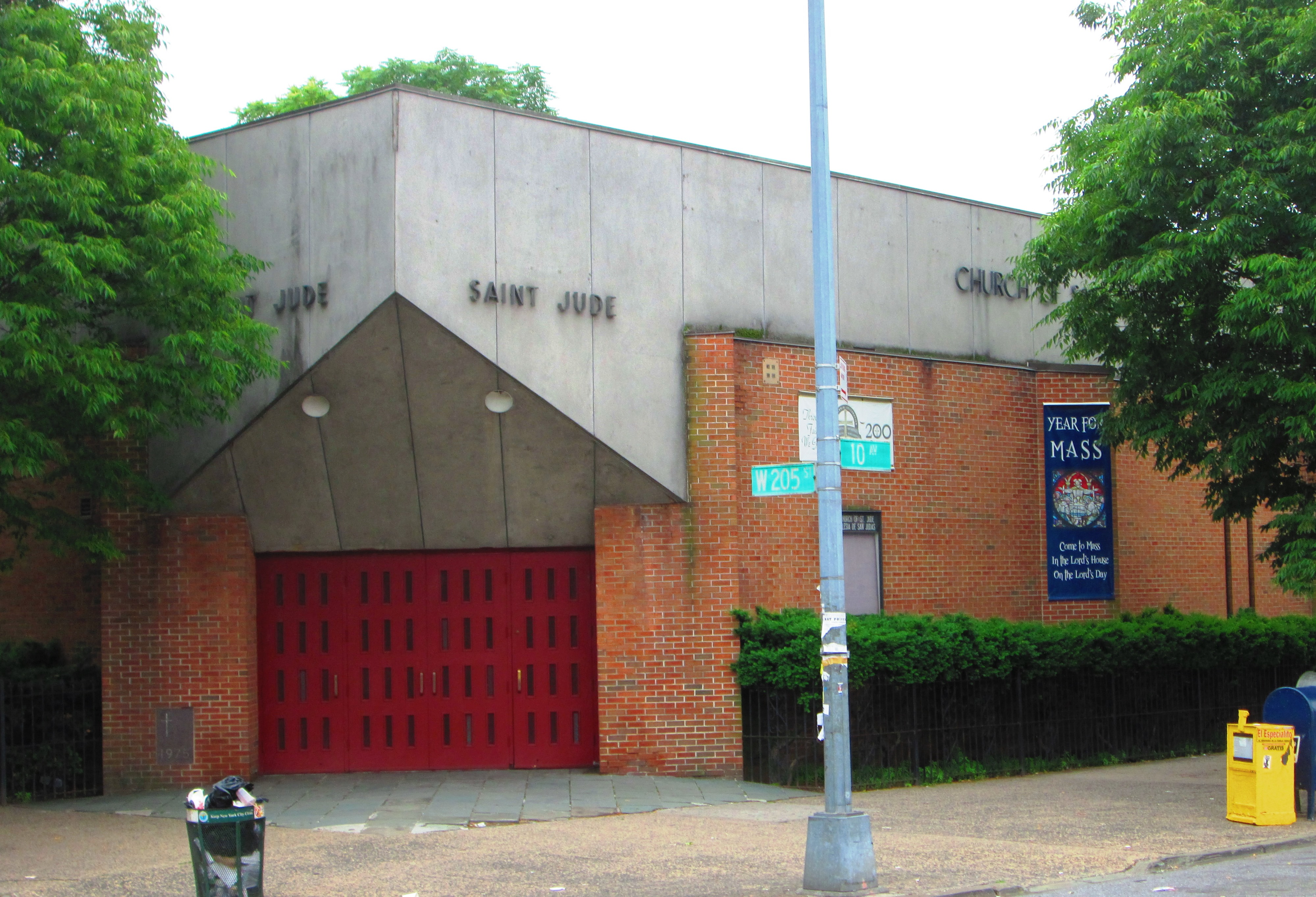
- (2014)
- Interactive map of the Church of St. Jude area

General information
- Architectural style: Brutalist
- Location: Inwood, Manhattan, New York City, U.S.
- Construction started: 1951 (church & school); 1954 (convent); 1957 (for rectory); 1975 (1976 church)
- Cost: $600,000 (1951 church & school) $200,000 (1954 convent) $200,000 (1957 rectory) $500,000 (1976 church)
- Client: Roman Catholic Archdiocese of New York

Design and construction
- Architects: 1951 church and school & 1954 convent: Voorhees, Walker, Foley & Smith; 1957 rectory: P. Goodman; 1976 church: Clark & Warren

Website
- https://churchofstjudeny.org/

The Church of St. Jude, located at 3815 Tenth Avenue at the corner of West 205th Street in the Inwood neighborhood of Manhattan, New York City, is a Catholic parish church in the Archdiocese of New York. Established in 1949, the current sanctuary was built in 1975-76 and was designed by Clark & Warren in the Brutalist style. The School of St. Jude, located around the corner at 431 West 204th Street and built in 1949–51 to designs by Voorhees, Walker, Foley & Smith, was originally the sanctuary as well. A two-story rectory at 411-445 West 204th Street was built in 1957 to designs by architect P. Goodman.
