= St. Richard's Catholic Church =

Historic church in Arkansas, United States

- U.S. National Register of Historic Places
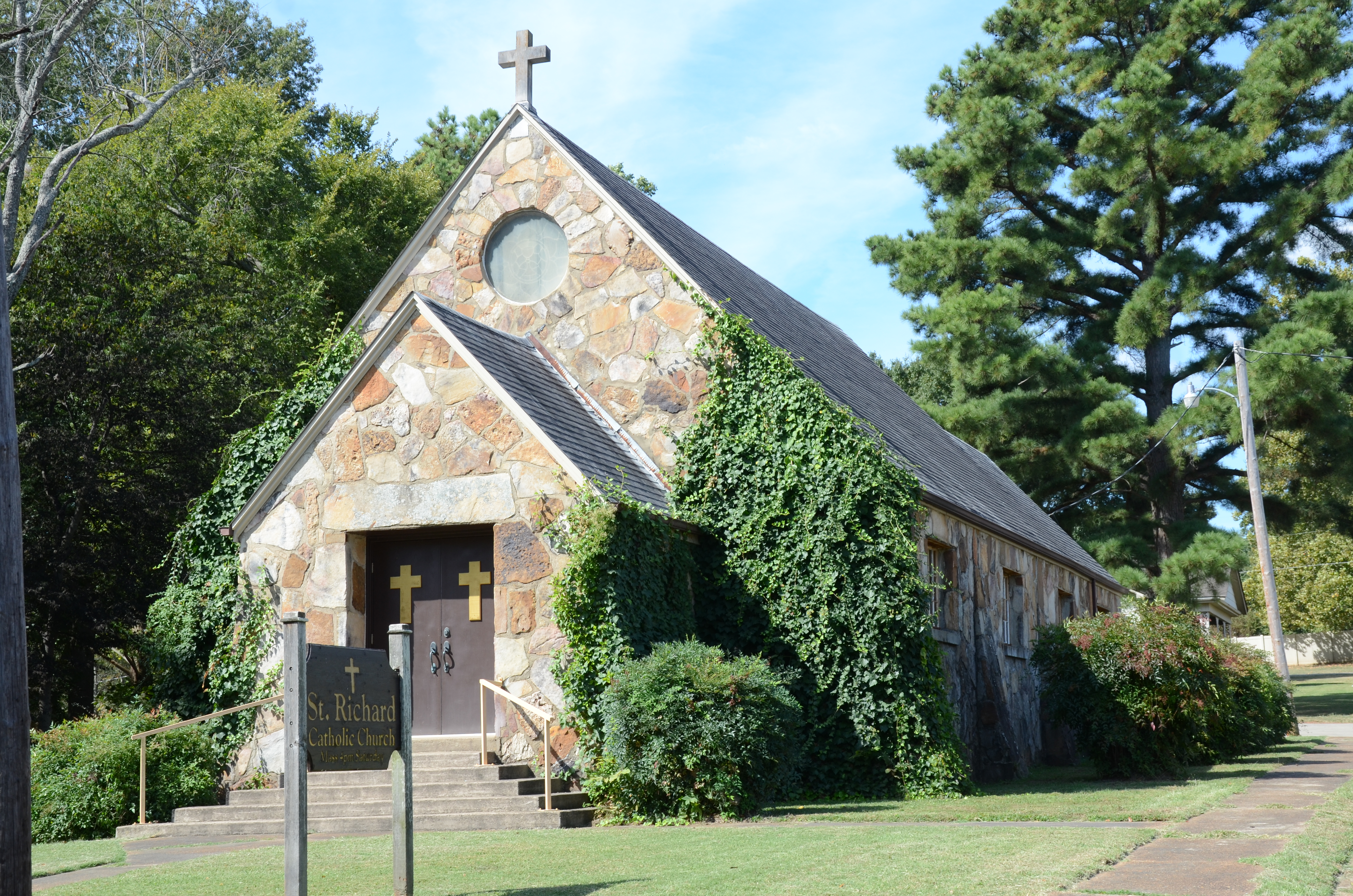

- Location within Arkansas Location within the United States
- Location: Jct. of Hickory and Cleveland Sts., Bald Knob, Arkansas
- Coordinates: 35°18′42″N 91°34′14″W
- Area: less than one acre
- Architectural style: NPS Rustic architecture
- MPS: White County MPS
- NRHP reference No.: 91001274
- Added to NRHP: July 20, 1992

St. Richard's Catholic Church is a historic church at the junction of Hickory and Cleveland Streets in Bald Knob, Arkansas. It is attended by St. James Church, Searcy, in the Diocese of Little Rock.

A single story structure, the church was built out of fieldstone in the Rustic style popularized in the 1930s by the National Park Service. It was built in 1939, and represents Bald Knob's best example of this style in an ecclesiastical structure. It has a gabled roof, with a project gabled entry vestibule, with a round window in the main gable above. It was listed on the National Register of Historic Places in 1992.

== See also ==
- National Register of Historic Places listings in White County, Arkansas
