= New York Presbyterian Church (Long Island City) =

Megachurch in Queens, New York

Coordinates: 40°45′3″N 73°55′7″W

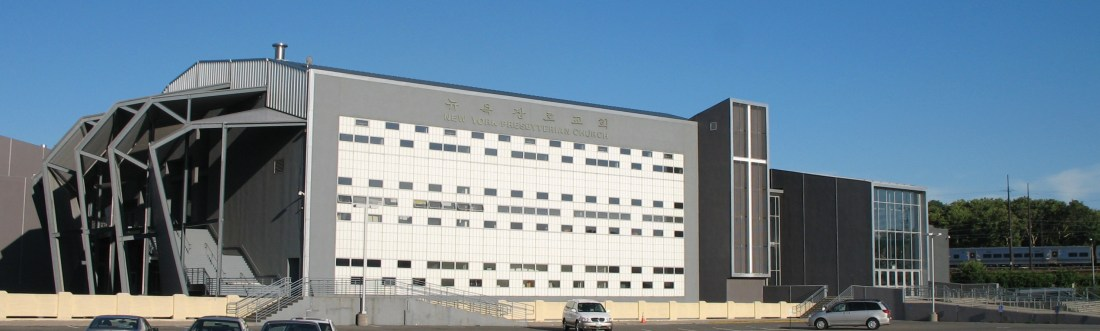
New York Presbyterian Church, a Korean megachurch in Queens

New York Presbyterian Church is a Korean Presbyterian megachurch in the Long Island City neighborhood of Queens in New York City.

The church was founded in 1970. The church affiliated with the Korean American Presbyterian Church in 1974, become member of the New York City Presbytery. In 1999 the church constructed its present building, designed by Greg Lynn. In 2010 the church celebrated its 40th anniversary. In 2013 New York Presbyterian Church disaffiliated with the Korean American Presbyterian Church and in 2014 it affiliated with the PCA, which it has left soon after. In this year the church begun outreach ministries to English as well as Chinese people.
