= Sanderling (disambiguation) =

A sanderling is a wading bird.

Sanderling may also refer to:

== People ==
- Kurt Sanderling (1912–2011), German conductor
- Michael Sanderling (born 1967), German conductor and violoncellist, son of Kurt Sanderling
- Stefan Sanderling (born 1964), German conductor, son of Kurt Sanderling
- Thomas Sanderling (born 1942), German conductor, son of Kurt Sanderling

== Other ==
- USS Sanderling, several ships of the U.S. Navy

== See also ==
- Sanderling Beach Club, a historic building in Sarasota, Florida, United States
