= Sarasota School of Architecture =

Architectural style

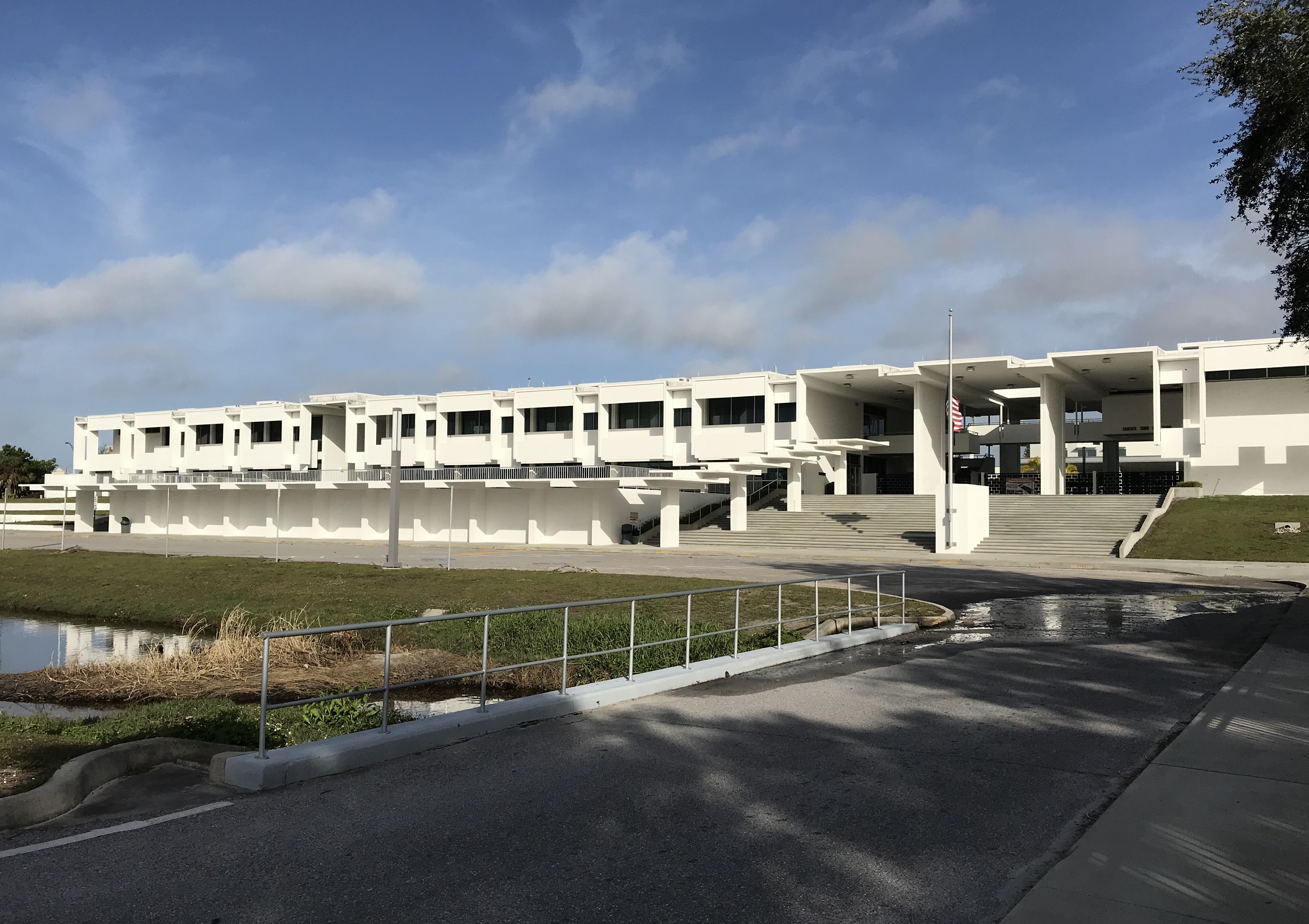
Sarasota High School Addition Paul Rudolph, Architect

The Sarasota School of Architecture, sometimes called Sarasota Modern, is a regional style of post-war modern architecture (1941–1966) that emerged on Florida's Central West Coast, in and around the city of Sarasota, Florida. It is characterized by open-plan structures, often with large planes of glass to facilitate natural illumination and ventilation; accommodating the unique indigenous requirements of the regional climate. Many of the architects who pioneered this style became world-renowned later in their careers, and several significant buildings from that era remain in Sarasota today.

== Building the foundation ==
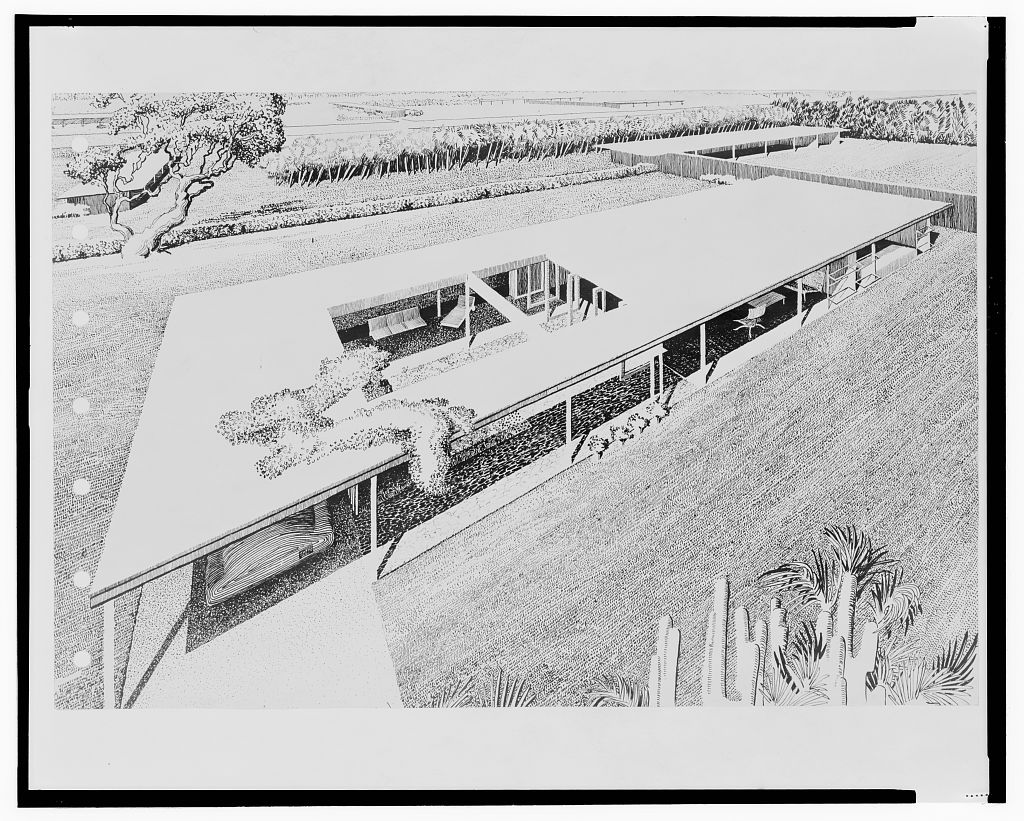
Revere Quality House Paul Rudolph, Architect, FAIA (Library of Congress)

Several factors gave rise to the Sarasota School of Architecture: the post-World War II residential building boom, the development of new construction technologies, the evolution of new architectural concepts, and the emergence of a new generation of architects willing to create ground-breaking and forward-thinking designs.

Ralph Twitchell is largely recognized as the founder of the "Sarasota School". He was among the first architects to experiment with reinforced concrete (lamolithic) construction techniques. His organic-modern architectural approach was influenced by Frank Lloyd Wright's usonian house designs: open design, cantilevered overhangs, clerestory windows, passive solar heating and natural cooling. Sarasota proved to be a particularly suitable climate for open-plan architecture. His son Tollyn Twitchell, became an architect and designed buildings in Sarasota. Tollyn Twitchell designed the Zigzag House which is seen as an "emblem of the Sarasota School of Architecture."

Architect Paul Rudolph partnered with Twitchell in 1947. Rudolph said that he chose to reside in Sarasota because, "For me, there is something about modern architecture which makes it more sympathetic to warm climates than cool climates." Rudolph had recently graduated from the Harvard Graduate School of Design, under the tutelage of Walter Gropius, founder of the Bauhaus School. For the next five years, Twitchell and Rudolph developed a design philosophy, combining organic-modern and international style into what became a unique form of architecture. This philosophy, articulated by Rudolph in 1947, was codified as follows: clarity of construction, maximum economy of means, simple overall volumes penetrating vertically and horizontally, clear geometry floating above the Florida landscape, honesty in details, and structural connections.

A number of ground-breaking experimental works built by Twitchell and Rudolph, reflecting this philosophy, gained worldwide notoriety as significant examples of modern architecture. These included Twitchell House, Revere Quality House, Lamolithic Houses, Healy Guest House, Siegrist House, and Leavengood Residence. They reflected the regional environment, some utilizing local cypress, many with floors raised to avoid the Florida dampness, most with windows and grilles designed to manipulate and redirect natural light and heat.

In 1952, architectural historian Henry Russell Hitchcock proclaimed, "the most exciting new architecture in the world is being done in Sarasota by a group of young architects".

== An architectural movement ==
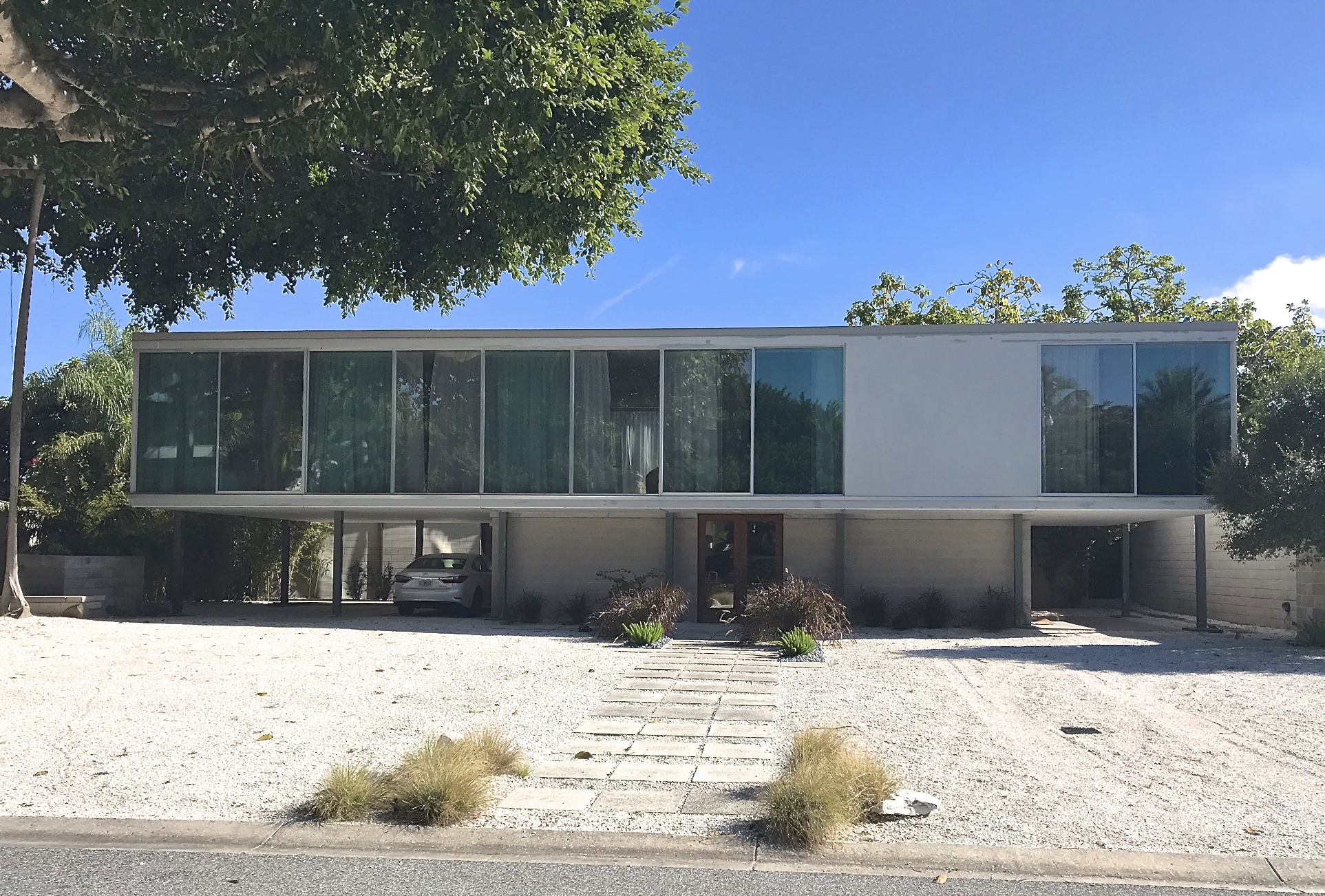
Hiss Studio Tim Seibert, Architect

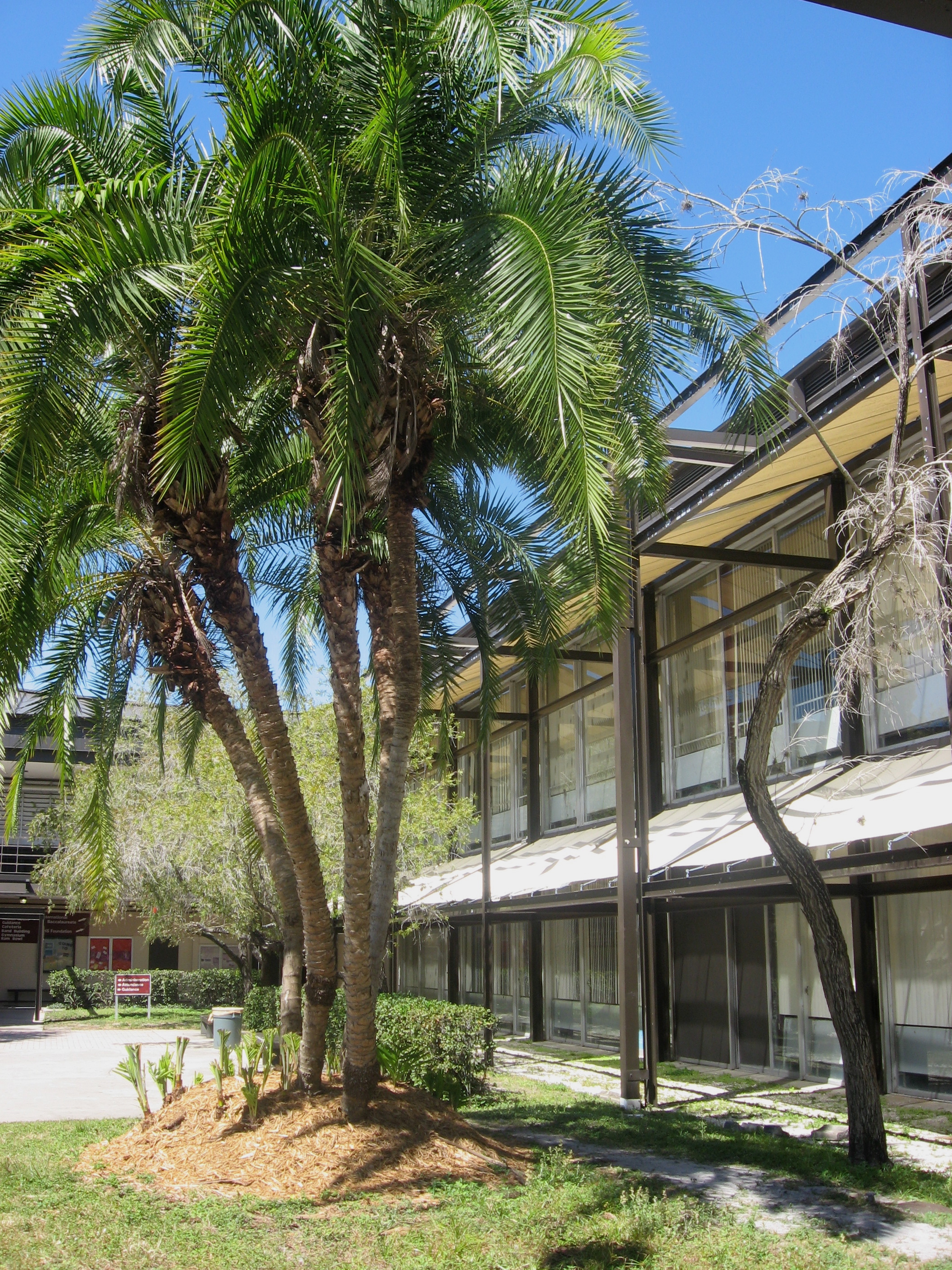
Riverview High School Paul Rudolph, Architect (Demolished)

Twitchell and Rudolph's Sarasota success had attracted a prominent group of like-minded architects to the region such as Gene Leedy, Tim Seibert, Jack West, Victor Lundy, William Rupp, Carl Abbott and Mark Hampton. These architects were collegial, often meeting for coffee at the Plaza Restaurant to discuss new concepts in architecture, with such interaction engendering new approaches to architectural design and generally evolving away from organic architecture and toward more abstract and geometric designs.

The works of these architects in the region during the 1950s and early 60s were significant. Rudolph launched an independent practice and produced the Walker Guest House, Sanderling Beach Club, Umbrella House, Deering Residence, Riverview High School, and Sarasota High School. Seibert designed Hiss Studio, Bay Plaza Condominium, Beachplace Condominium, Siesta Key Beach Pavilion, and John D. MacDonald Pavilion. Lundy built the Warm Mineral Springs Motel, Bee Ridge Presbyterian Church, St. Paul Lutheran Church, Greater Sarasota Chamber of Commerce, and Alta Vista Elementary School. Leedy built the Syd Solomon Studio, Garcia Residence, and Brentwood Elementary School (with William Rupp). Rupp (with partner Joe Farrell) designed the Scott Commercial Building. Jack West's work included Sarasota City Hall, First Federal Savings Bank, and Nokomis Beach Pavilion. Most of these structures have been recognized by the American Institute of Architects and/or have been placed on the U.S. National Register of Historic Places.

Local entrepreneur Philip Hanson Hiss III played a key role in the proliferation of Sarasota modernism. He initiated residential developments (such as Lido Shores) that showcased innovative modern architecture. He also became active in the local school board (elected chairman in 1956) and was able to obtain several architectural commissions for school building projects. He was a driving force in the creation of New College in Sarasota, and hired architect I.M. Pei to design the campus.

By the late 1950s, the Sarasota School was beginning to decline. Twitchell was in near-retirement. Rudolph had moved most of his practice to New York. Leedy also left Sarasota, moving to Winter Haven in 1955. Lundy moved to New York in 1960. The fertile environment for innovative architecture had evaporated, replaced by corporate real estate developers more interested in making money than fine art.

The Sarasota School was given its name and defined as a movement ex post facto by Leedy during a presentation at an American Institute of Architects conference in Tampa, Florida in 1982. "I was supposed to put on a big program about what we were doing, and I had to think of a name for the brochure. In those days, they used to refer to the architects in Chicago as the ‘Chicago School,’ so I called us the ‘Sarasota School,’ and it stuck," Leedy said. In attendance at that meeting were most of its original members, including Rudolph, Seibert, Rupp, Lundy, and Bert Brosmith.

== Legacy ==
Between 1960 and 1990, most of the mid-century modern structures in Sarasota fell into disrepair and were demolished. However, with the restoration of the historically-significant Healy Guest House and Revere Quality House, there was a resurgence in efforts to preserve Sarasota School architecture. The Umbrella House and Hiss Studio on Lido Shores have been restored. Portions of the Rudolph Sarasota High School addition have been preserved. Dozens of other historic structures have been rehabilitated.

Riverview High School was considered for the list of America's Most Endangered Places by the National Trust for Historic Preservation, but was demolished in 2009.

The Sarasota Architectural Foundation was created in 2003 to increase public education about the "Sarasota School" and actively advocate for and celebrate such structures. Similarly, the Center for Architecture Sarasota, located in the Scott Commercial Building, is a non-profit organization with the goal of heightening the awareness of Sarasota’s innovative architecture.

The Sarasota School has continued to influence a number of contemporary architects (such as Jonathan Parks, Max Strang and Guy Peterson) who embrace the movement's original principles of clarity of construction, honesty in details, clear geometry, and environmental sensitivity.

== Representative architecture ==
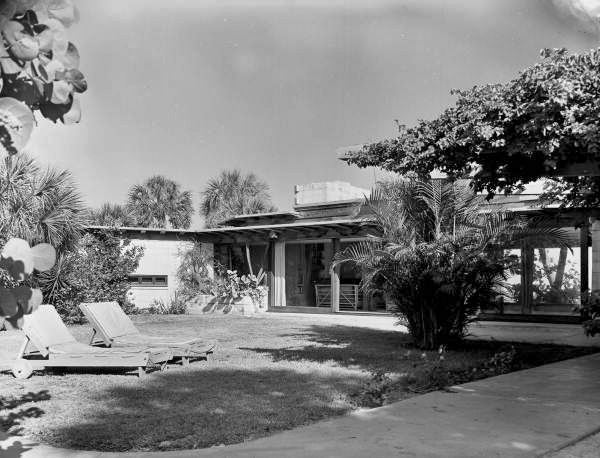
Twitchell House (Twitchell and Rudolph)

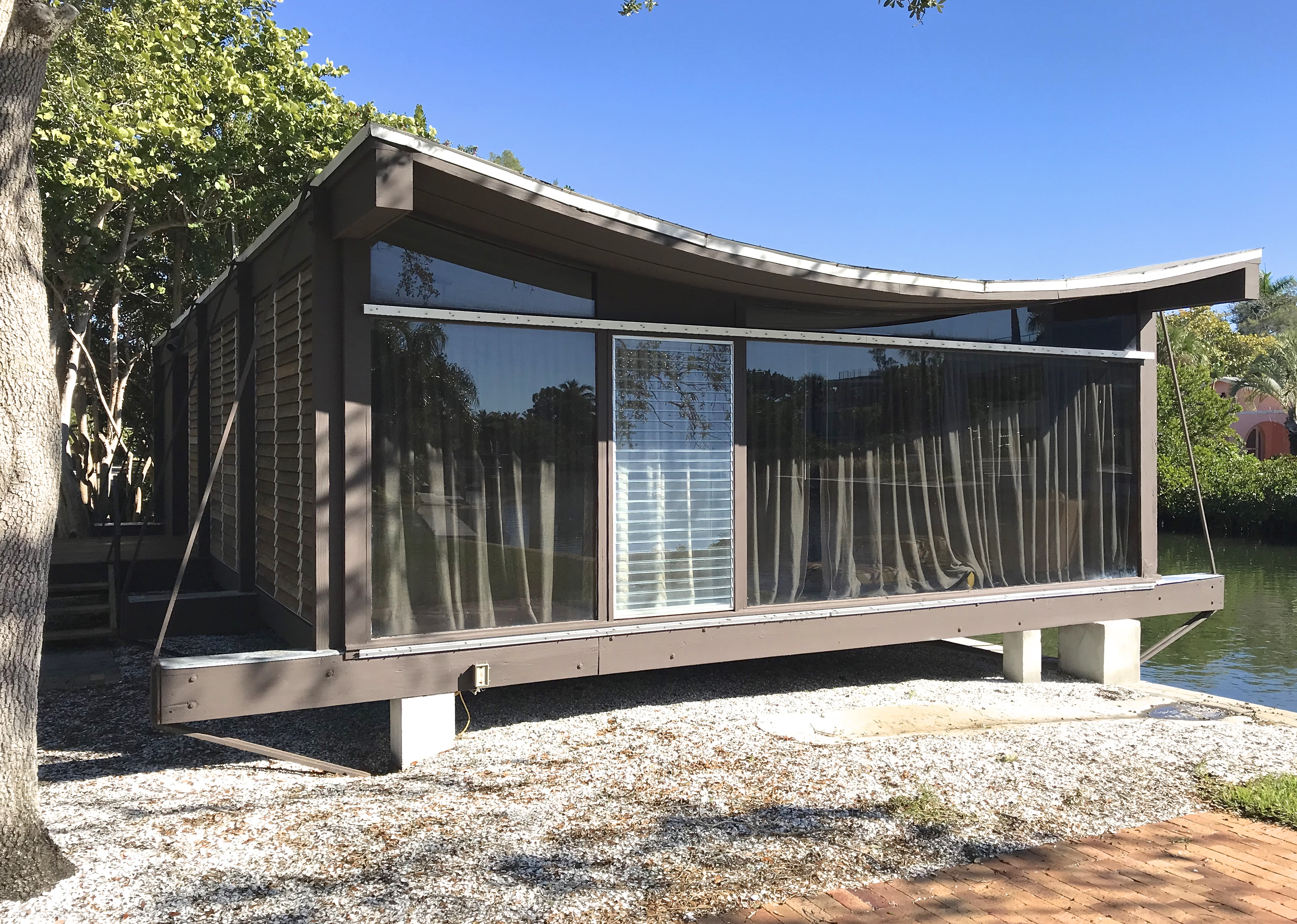
Healy Guest House (Twitchell and Rudolph)

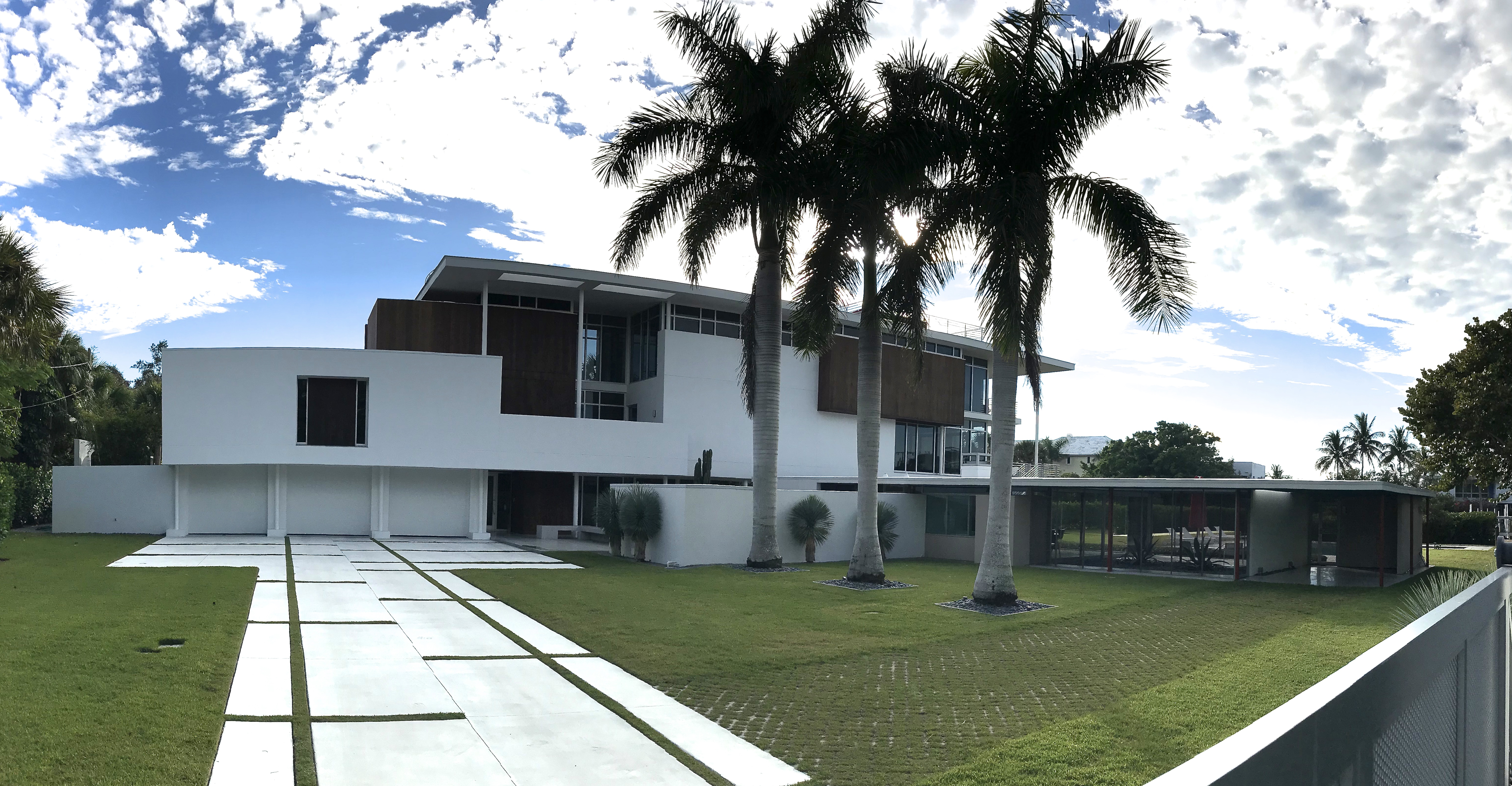
Revere Quality House (Original house - Twitchell and Rudolph. Companion House - Peterson)

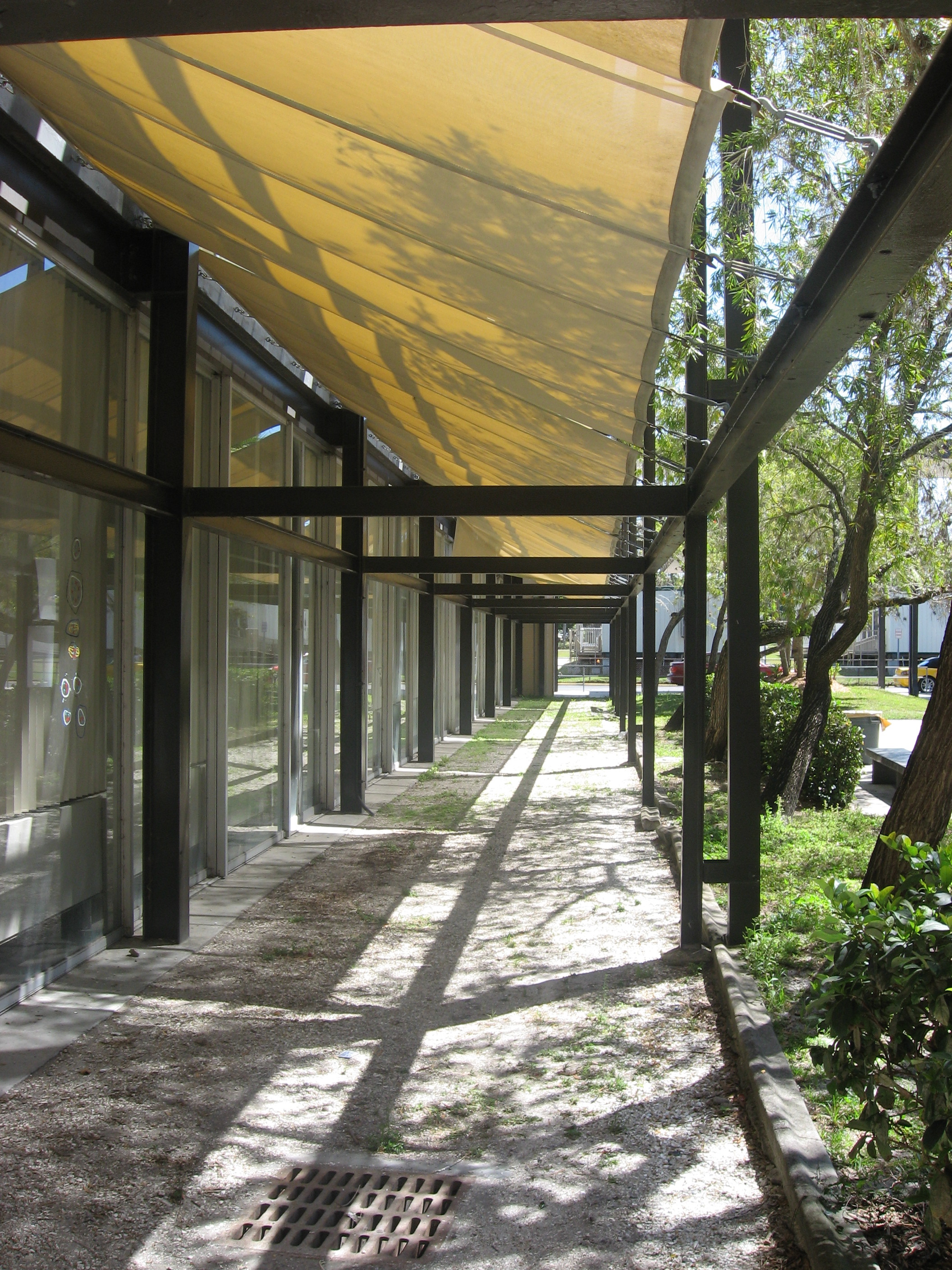
Riverview High School (Rudolph)

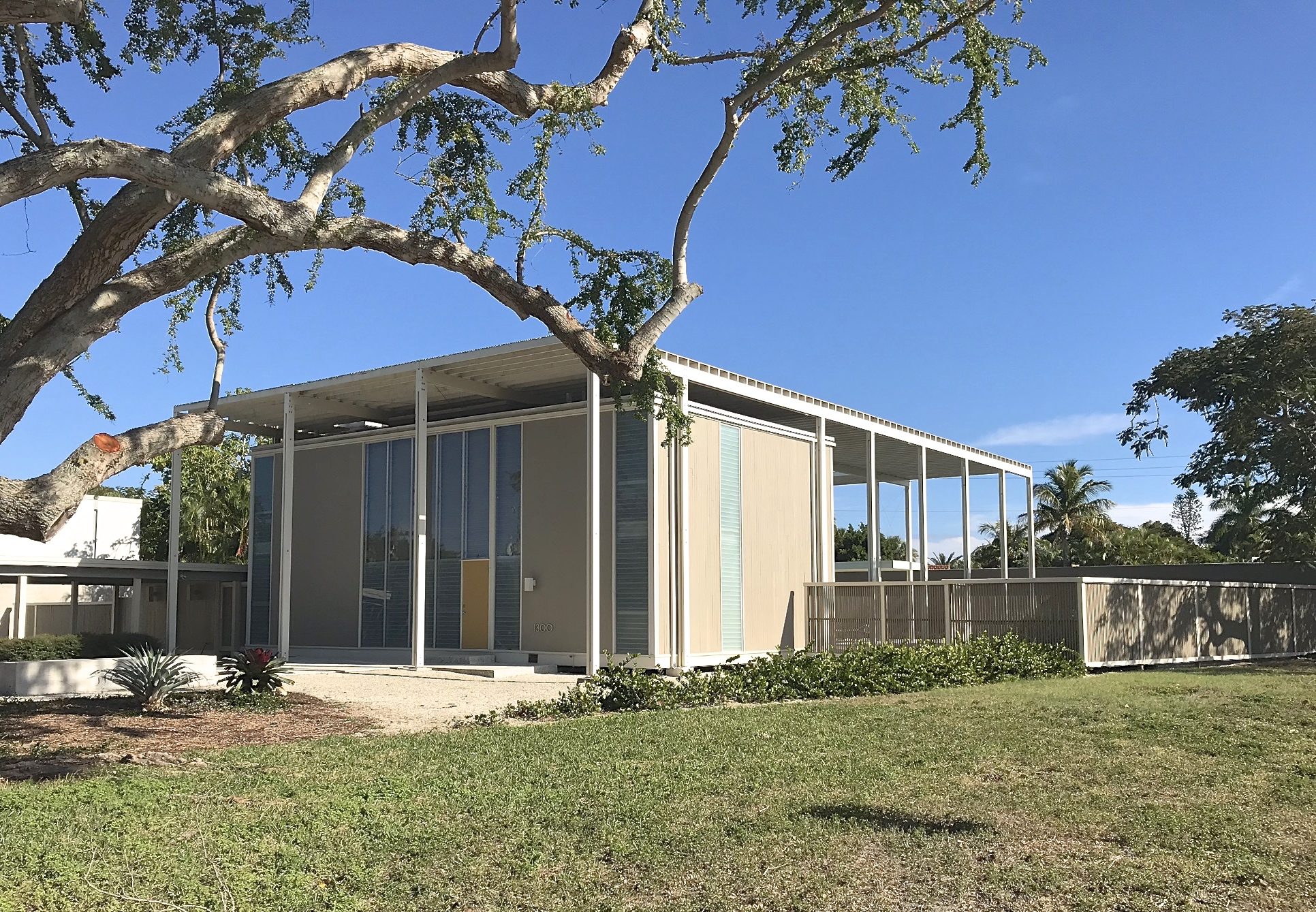
Umbrella House (Rudolph)

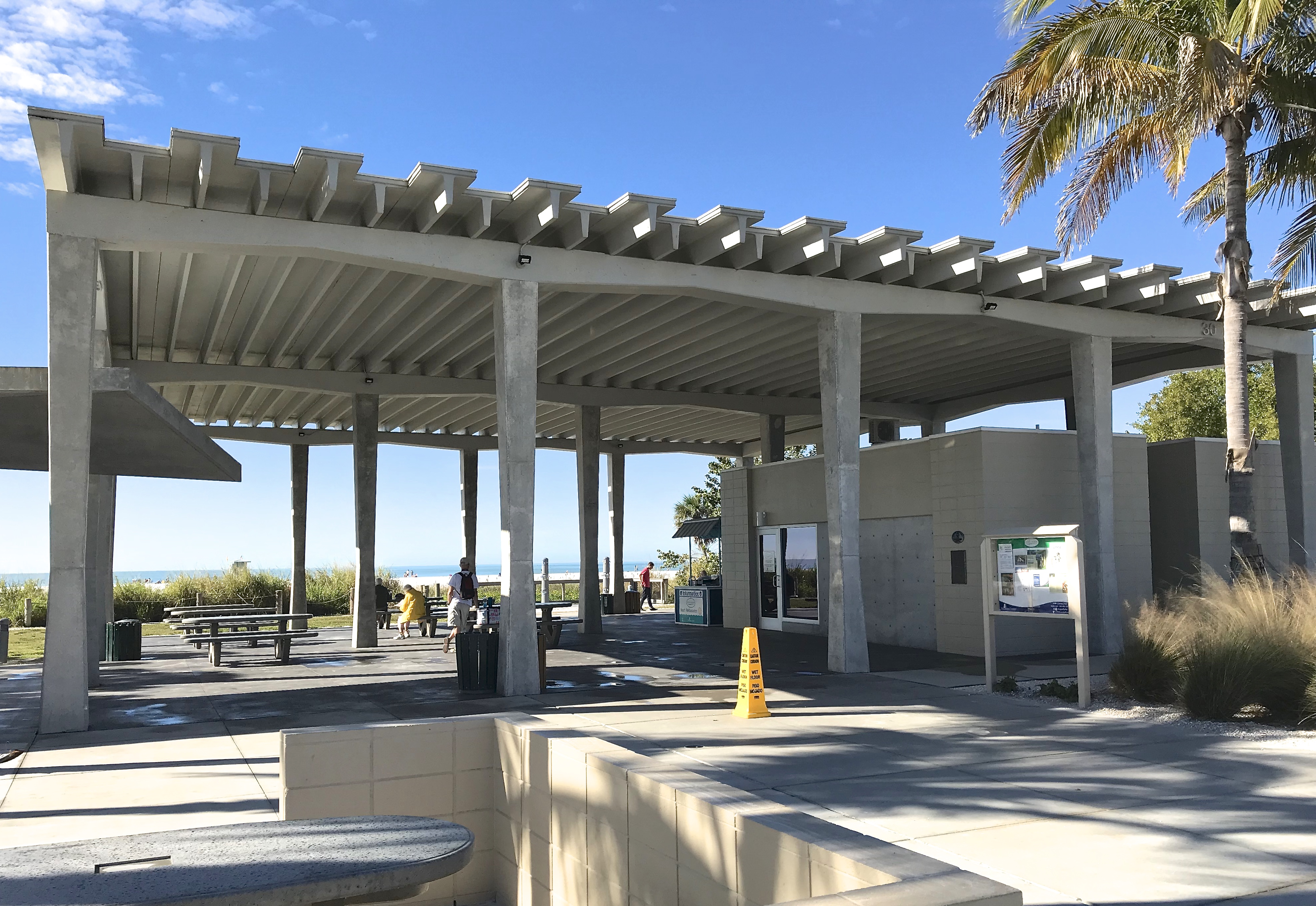
Siesta Key Beach Pavilion (Seibert)

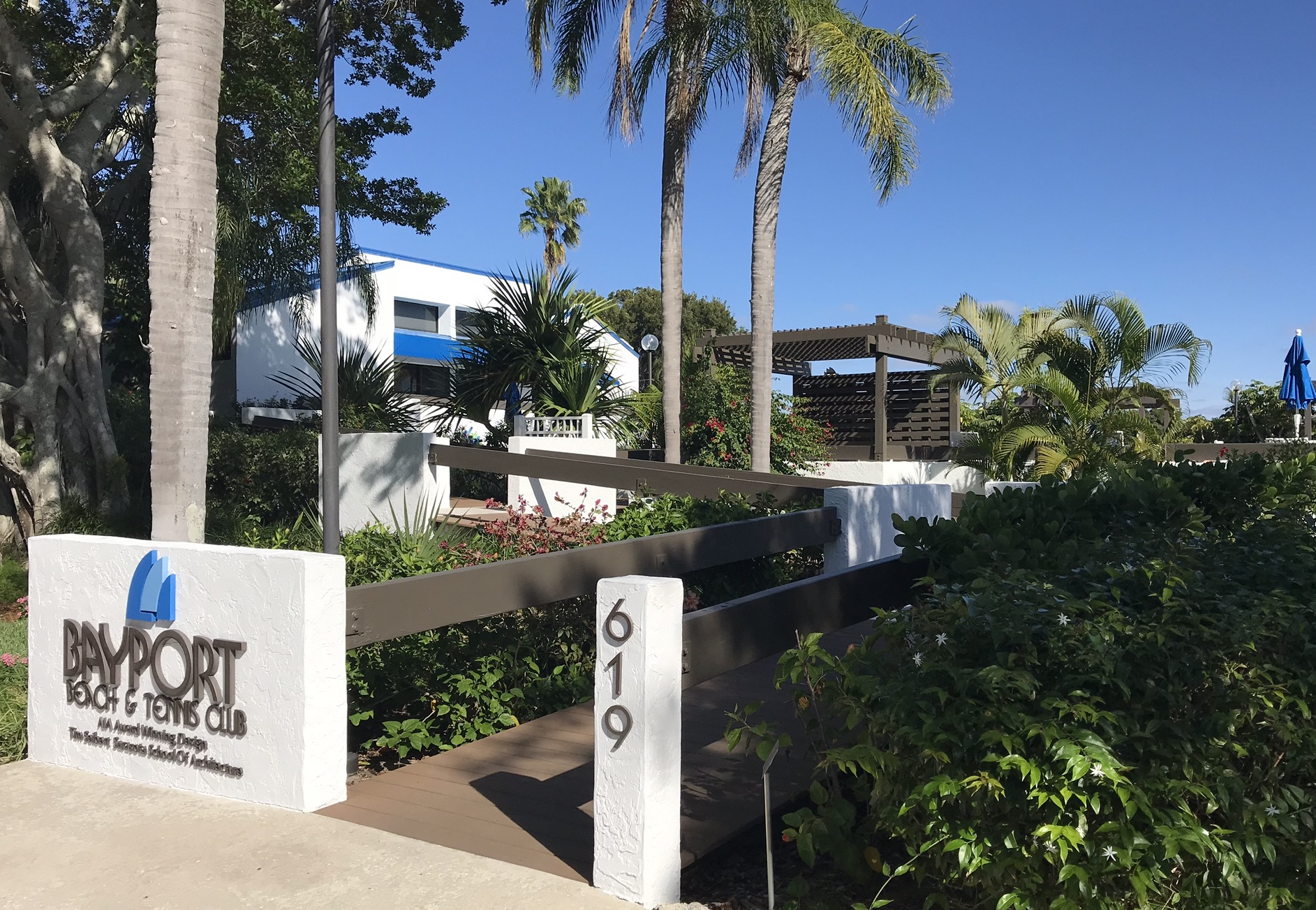
Bayport Beach and Tennis Club (Seibert)

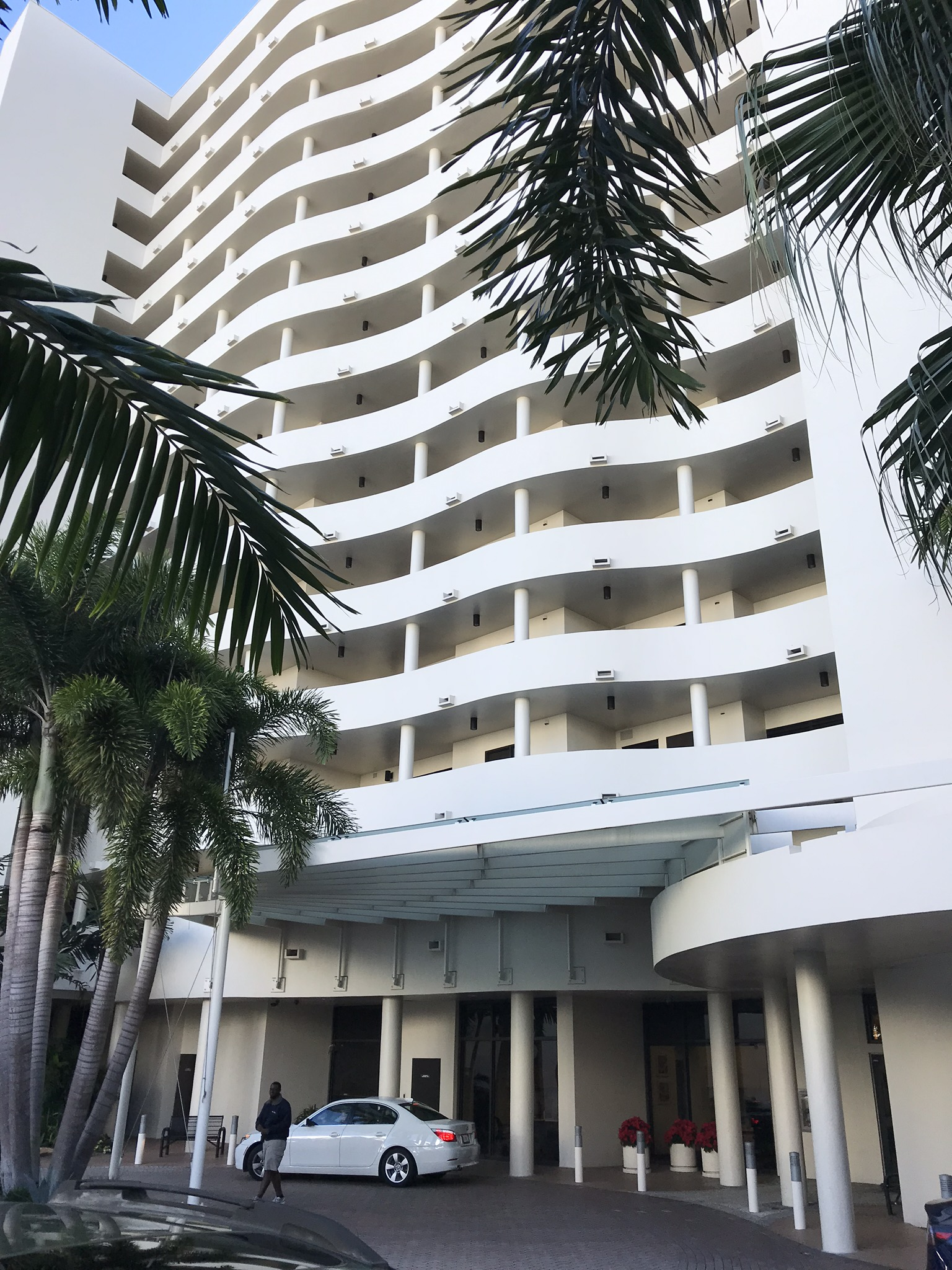
Bay Plaza (Seibert)

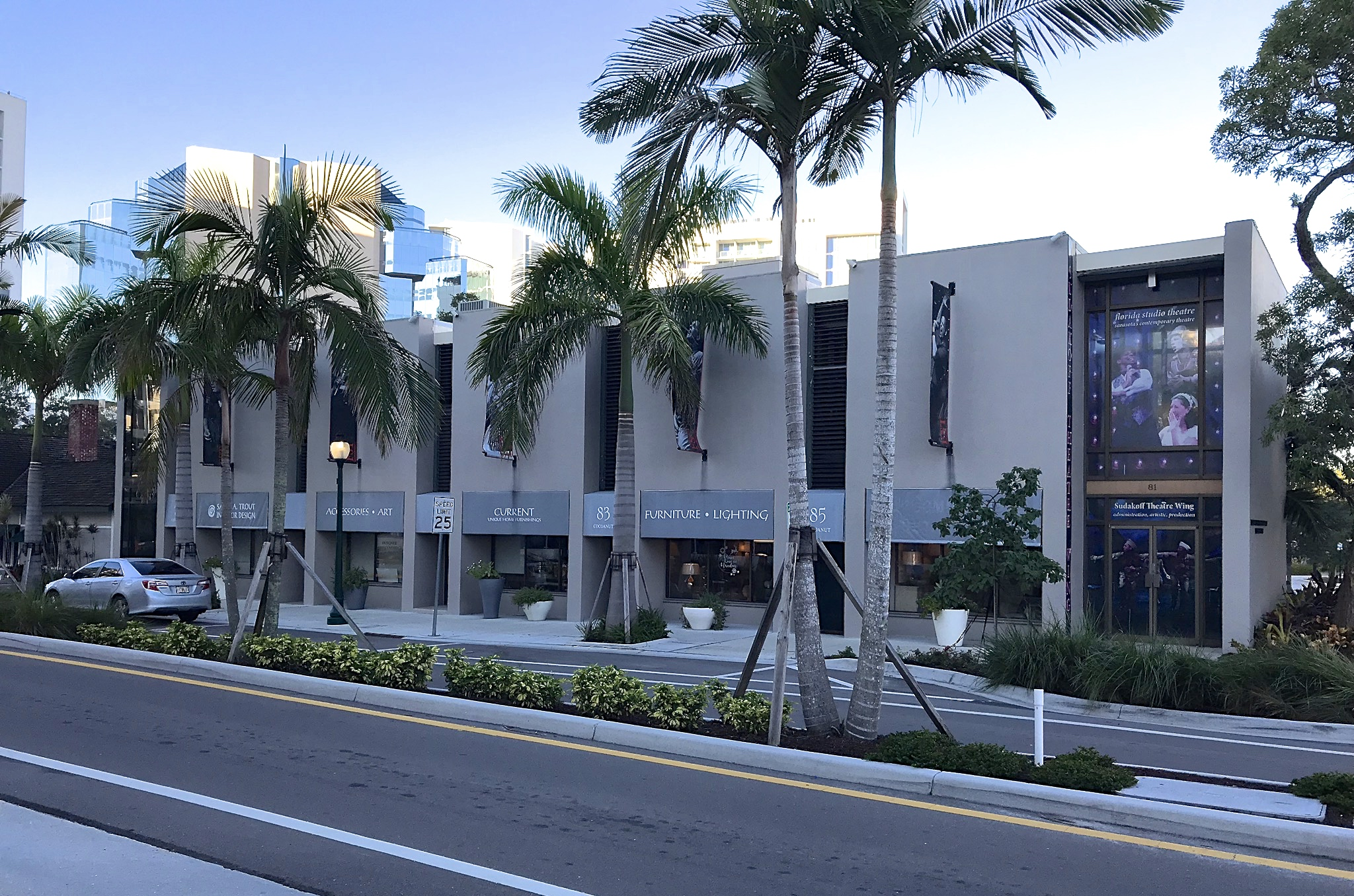
81 Cocoanut (Seibert)

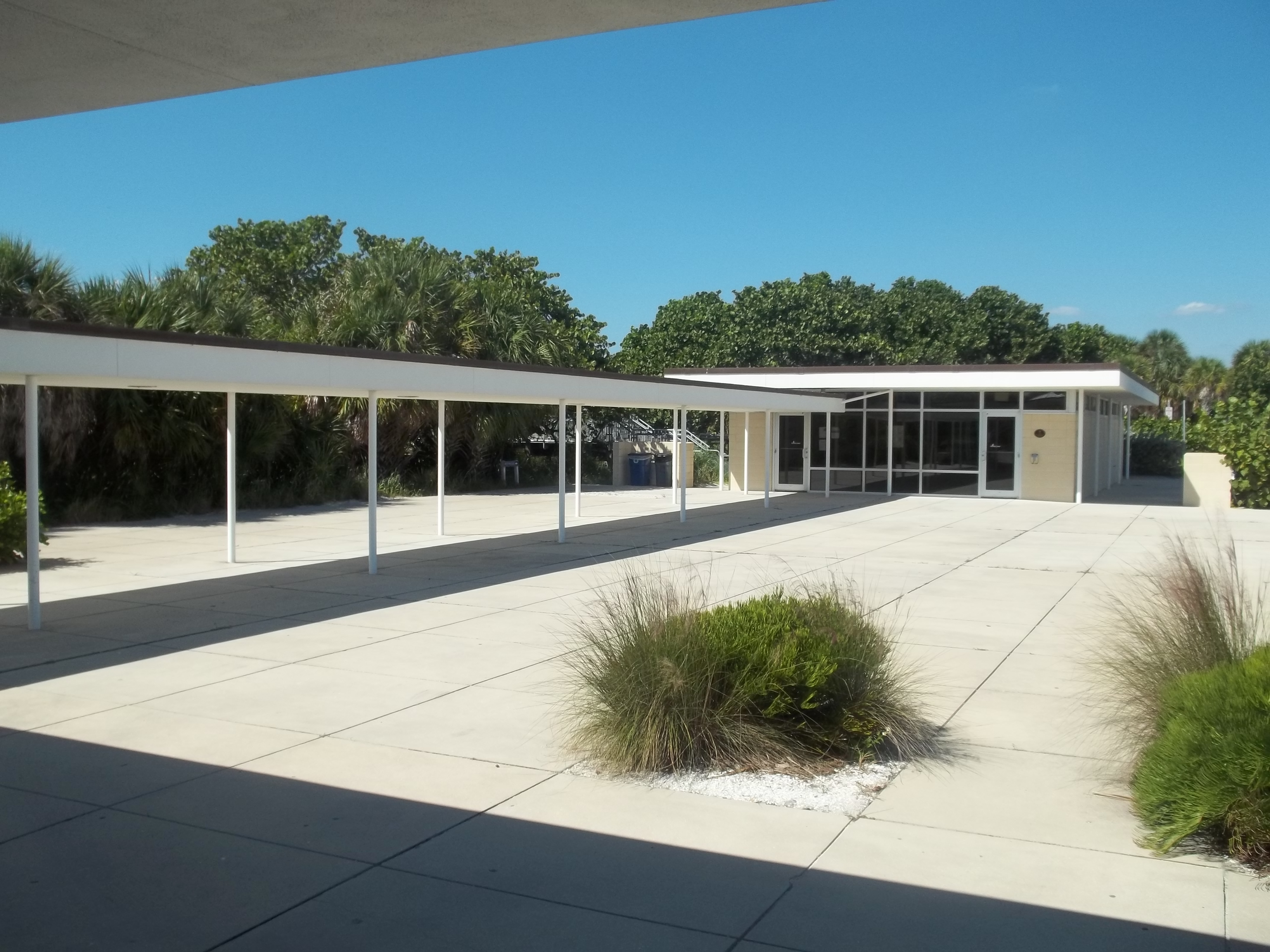
Nokomis Beach Pavilion (West)

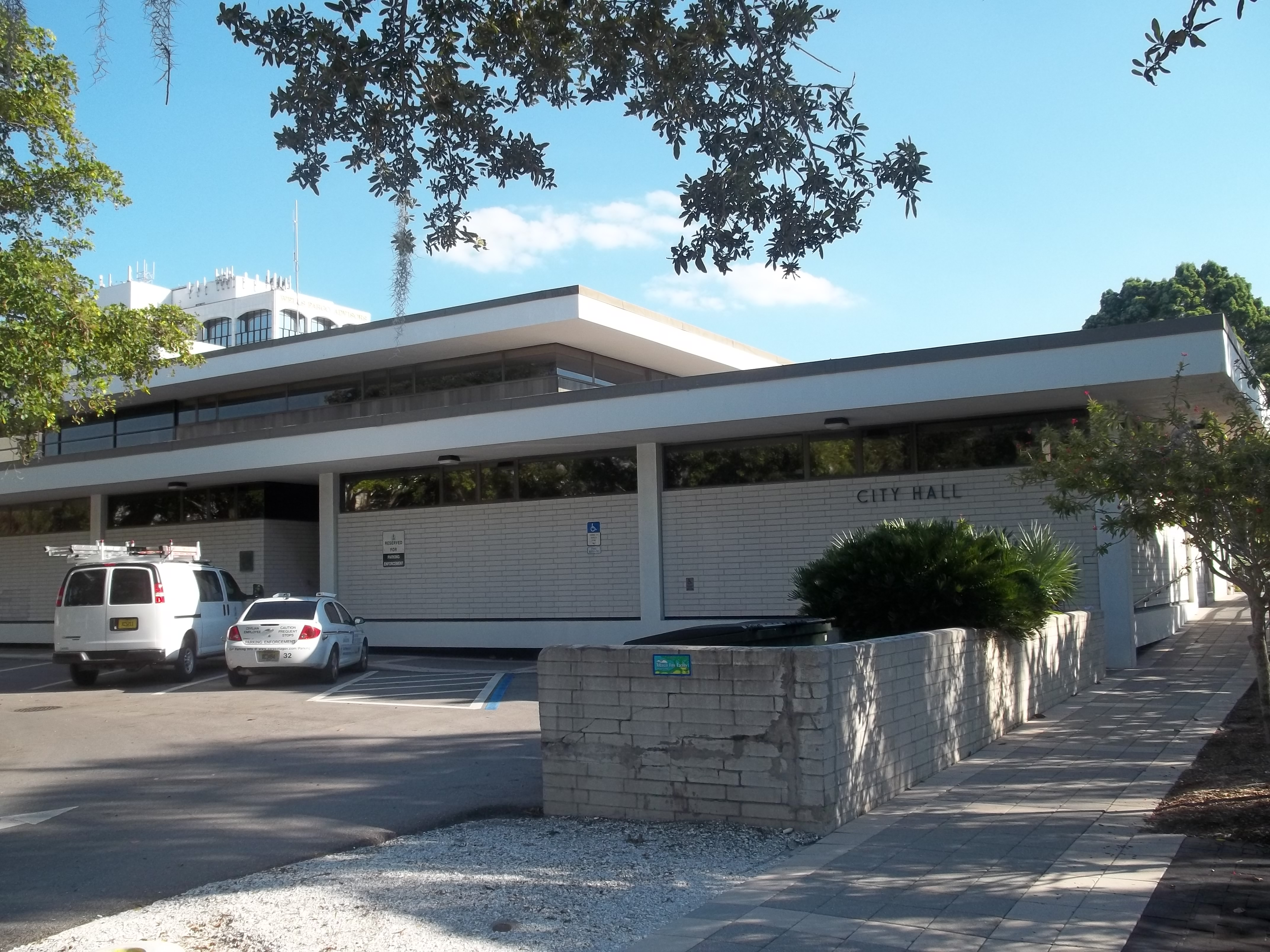
Sarasota City Hall (West)

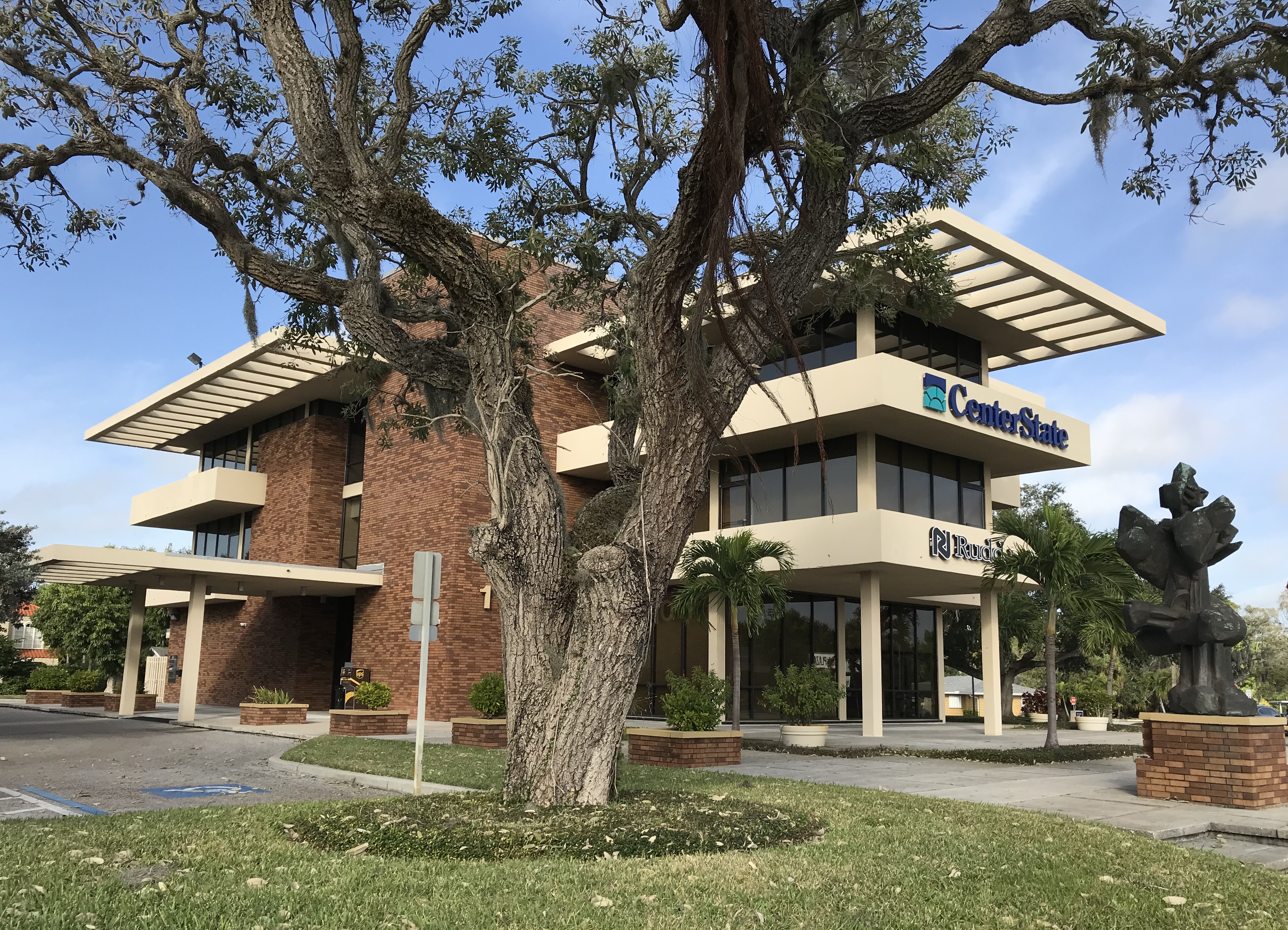
First Federal Savings and Loan Association of Manatee County (West)

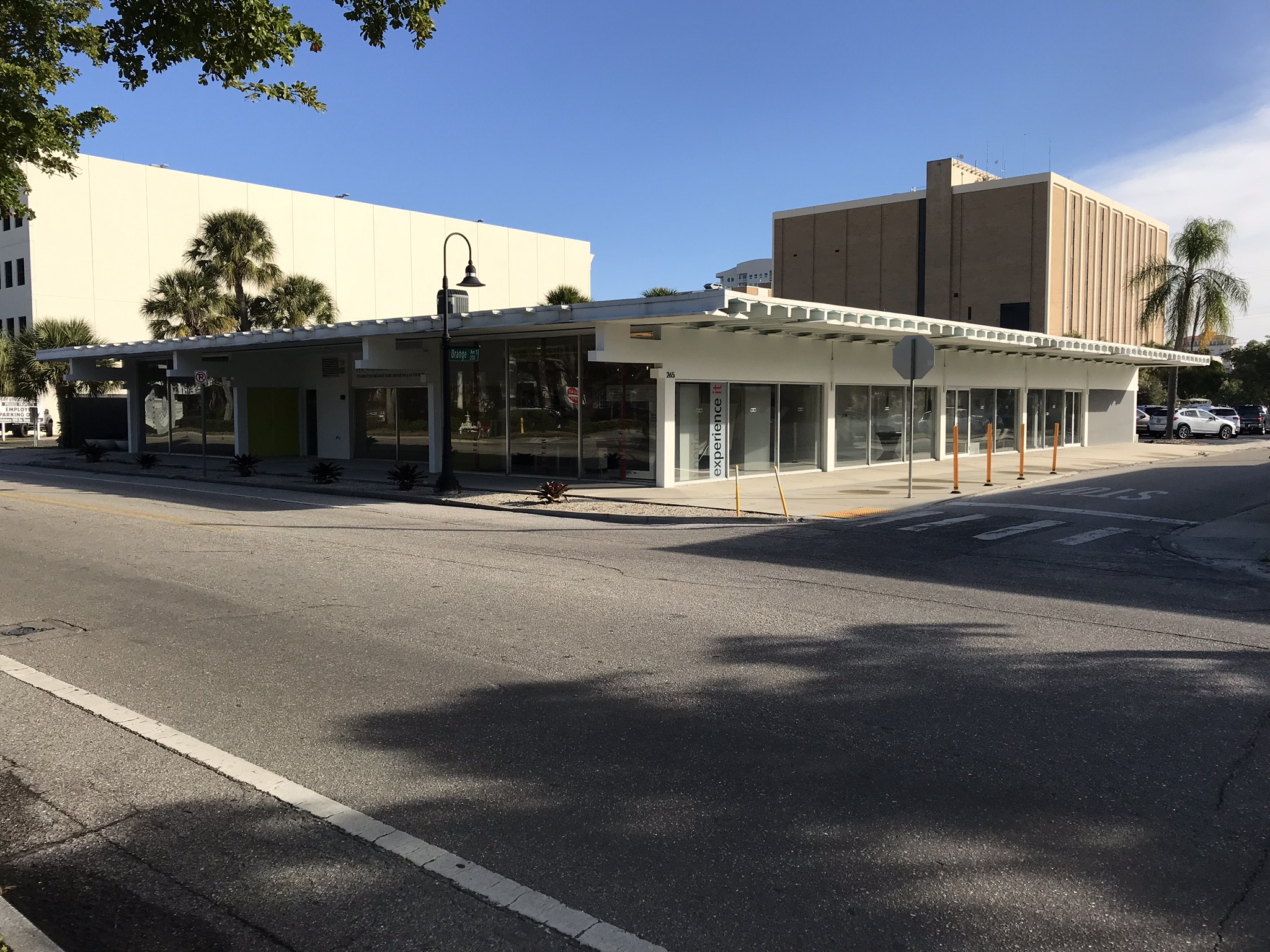
McCulloch Pavilion (Center For Architecture Sarasota, Rupp and Farrell)

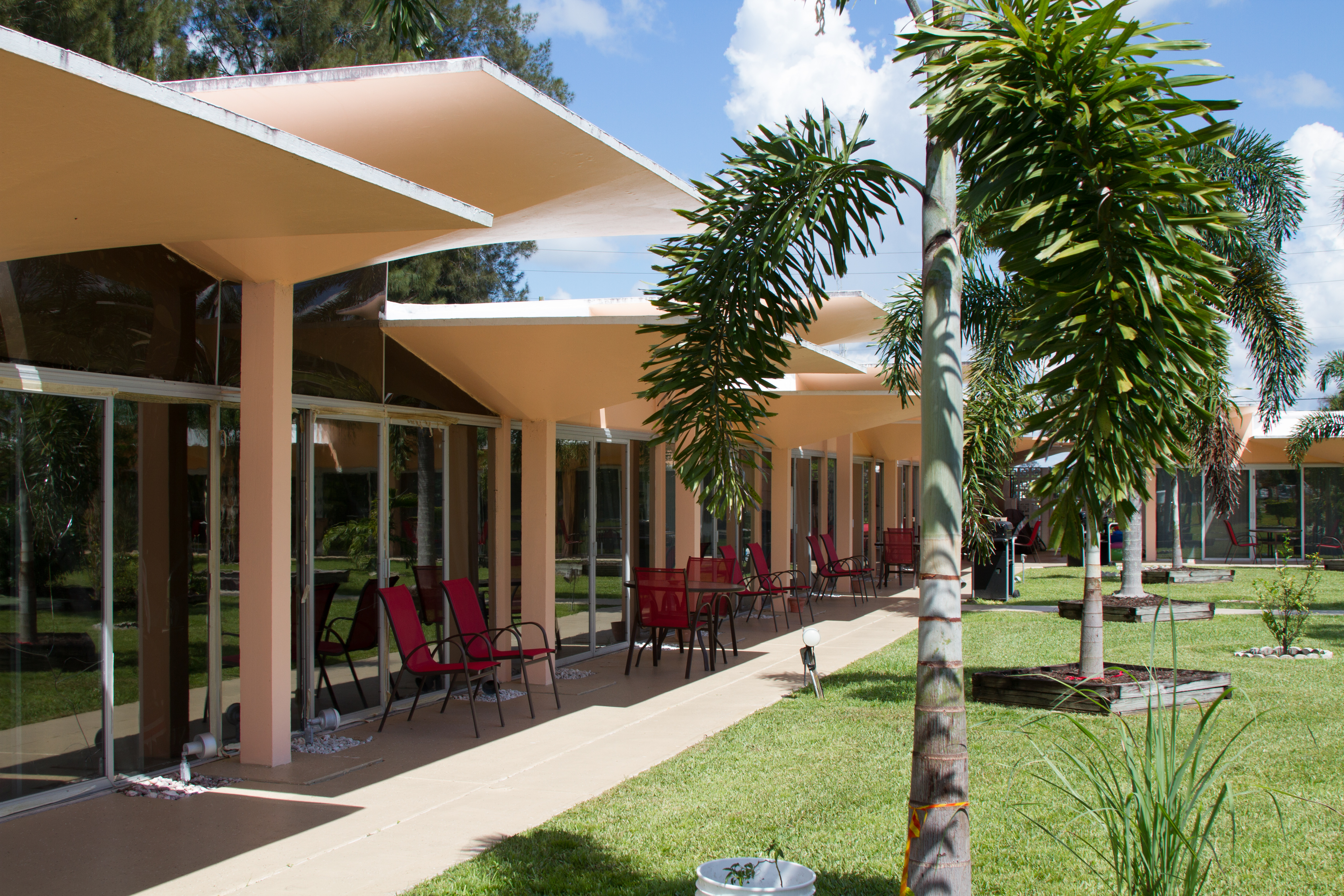
Warm Mineral Springs Motel Wing (Lundy)

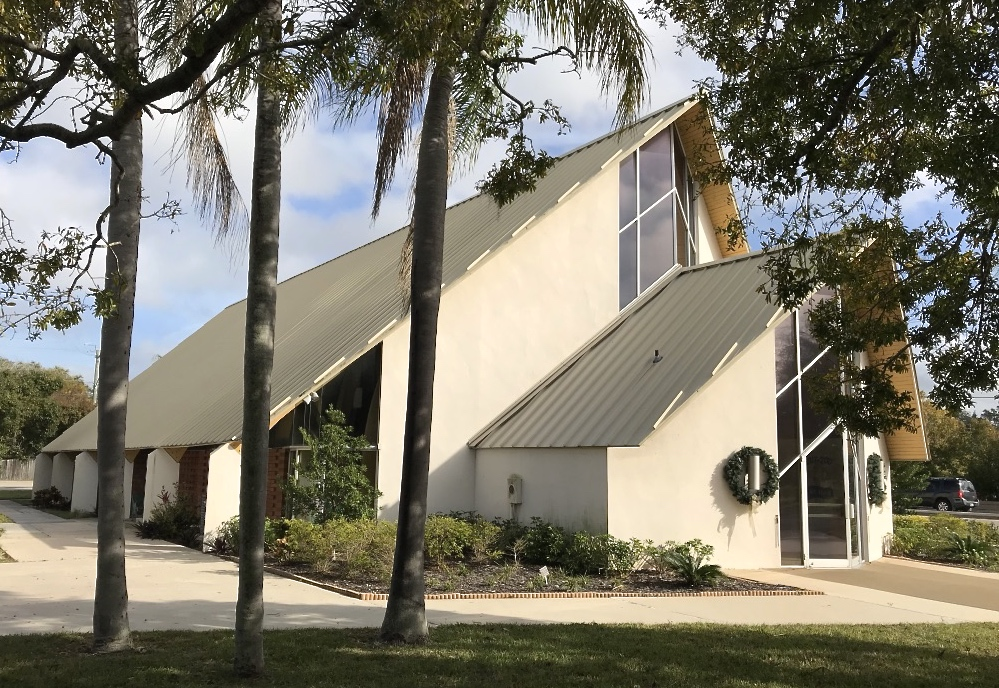
Bee Ridge Presbyterian Church (Lundy)

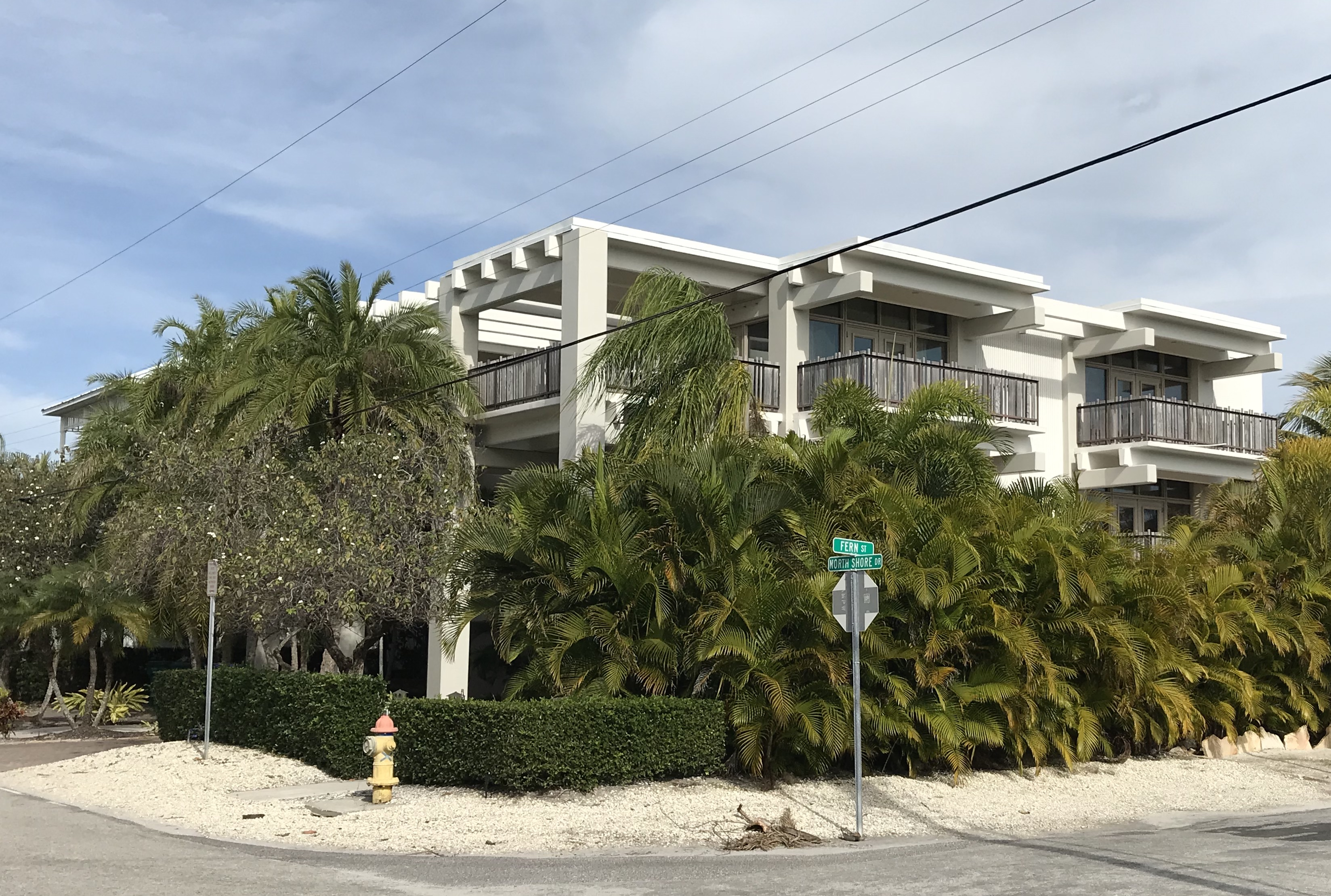
Garcia Residence (Leedy)

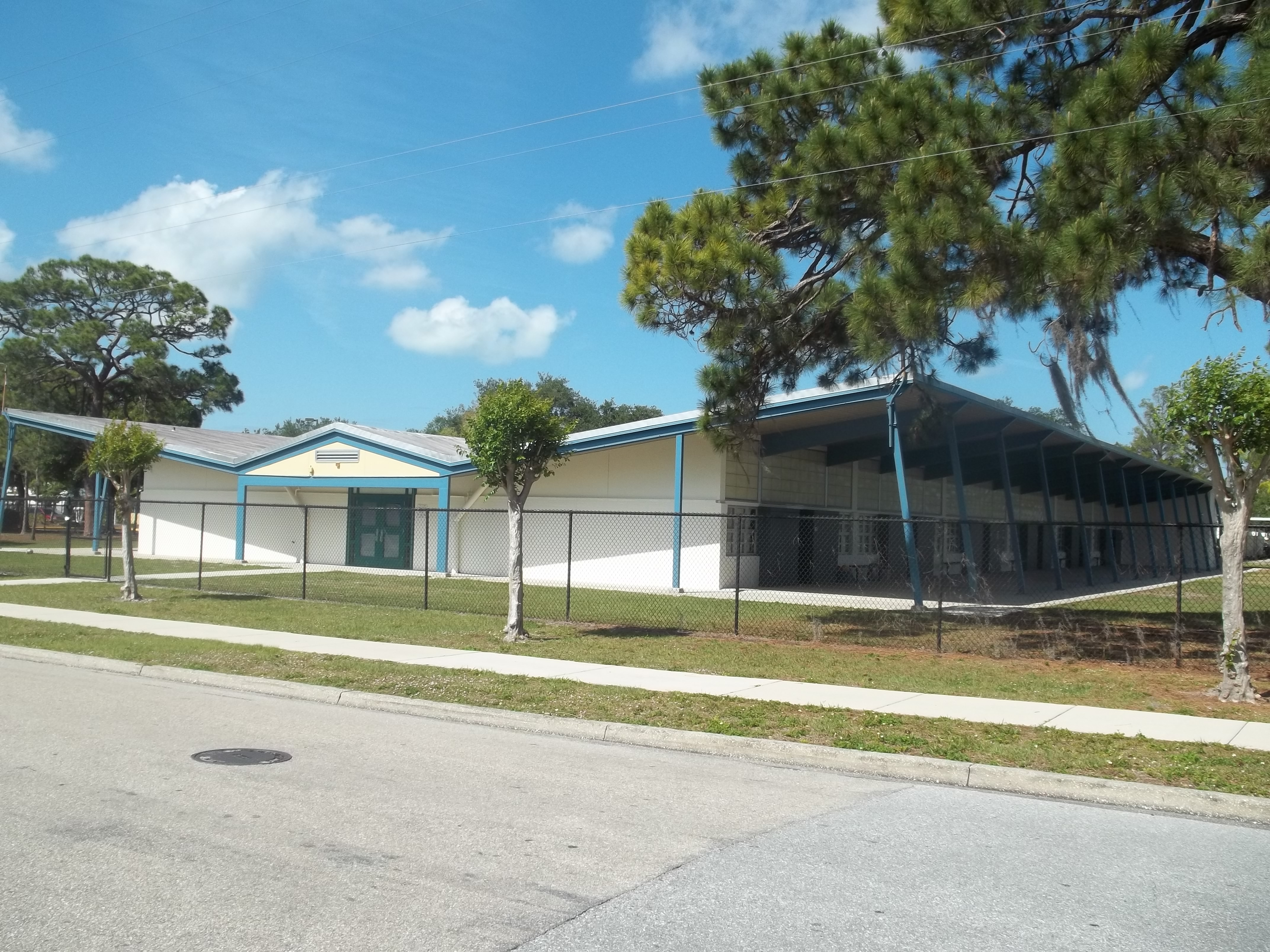
Butterfly Wing addition at the Alta Vista Elementary School

== See also ==
- John Howey (1932–2019)

== Bibliography ==
- Bradbury, Dominic (2017). The Iconic House: Architectural Masterworks Since 1900. Thames and Hudson Press. ISBN 978-0-50029-394-2.
- Cantacuzino, Sherban (1964). Modern Houses of the World. New York, New York: Dutton Publishing. ISBN 978-0-28927-970-0. Archived from the original on January 3, 2019.
- Hochstim, Jan (2005). Florida Modern : Residential Architecture 1945-1970. Rizzoli New York. pp. 170–179. ISBN 978-0-84782-603-2.
- Howey, John (1995). The Sarasota School of Architecture: 1941 - 1966. Cambridge, MA: MIT Press. ISBN 978-0-26208-240-2.
- King, Joseph; Domin, Christopher (February 1, 2002). Paul Rudolph: The Florida Houses. Princeton Architectural Press. ISBN 978-1-56898-266-3.
- Museum of Modern Art (1952). Hitchcock, Henry-Russell; Drexler, Arthur (eds.). Built in USA; post-war architecture (PDF). New York, NY: Simon & Schuster. pp. 112–113. ISBN 978-1-25849-069-0 – via MoMA.org.
- McCallum, Ian (1959). Architecture USA. New York, New York: Reinhold Publishing. ASIN B000GU4G9K.
- Peter, John (1958). Masters of Modern Architecture. Bonanza Books. ISBN 978-1-49938-616-5.
- Rice, Patty Jo (1992). Interpreting Moods In Sticks, Stones, and Sunshine: The Life and Architecture of Ralph Twitchell. University of South Florida – via Google Books.
- Rudolph, Paul (1970). The Architecture of Paul Rudolph. New York, New York: Praeger Publishing. ASIN B000MRIKOY.
- Rudolph, Paul (2009). Writings on Architecture. Yale University Press. ISBN 978-0-30015-092-6.
- Weaving, Andrew (2005). The Home Modernized. London: Jacqui Small LLP. ISBN 978-1-90322-135-8.
- Weaving, Andrew (2006). Sarasota Modern. Rizzoli New York. ISBN 978-0-84782-872-2.
