= Nokomis Beach Pavilion =

- U.S. National Register of Historic Places
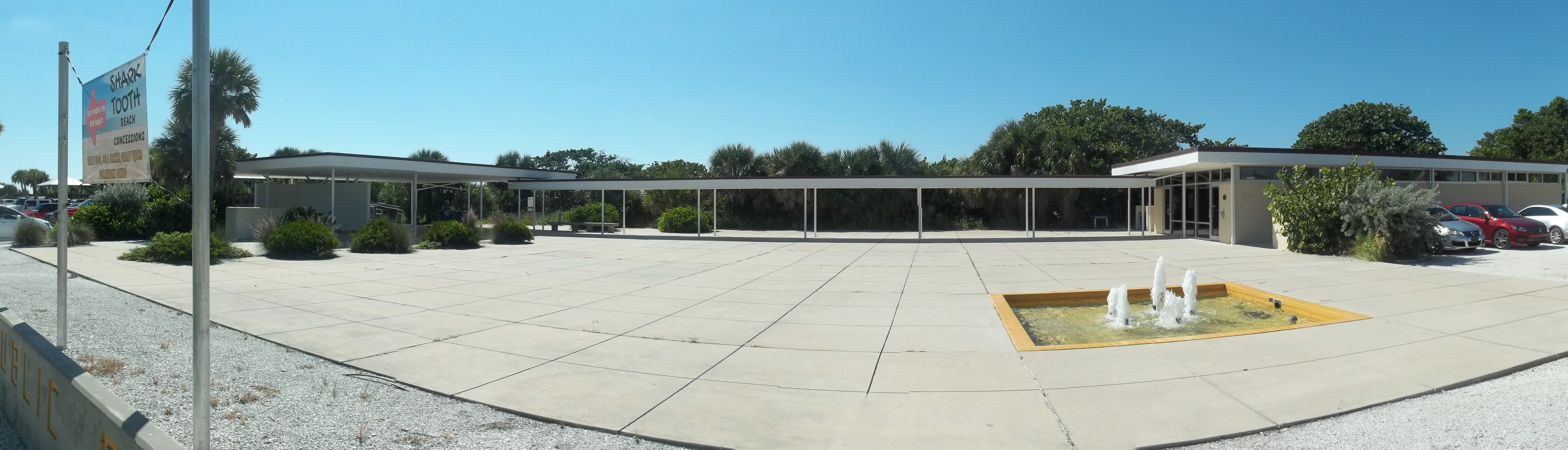

- Location within Florida
- Location: Nokomis, Florida
- Coordinates: 27°07′28″N 82°28′13″W
- Architect: Jack West
- NRHP reference No.: 13000320
- Added to NRHP: May 28, 2013

Nokomis Beach Pavilion is a historic site located in Nokomis, Florida. The pavilion is Sarasota County's first beach pavilion.

== History ==
The pavilion was designed by architect Jack West, a member of the Sarasota School of Architecture, and is an example of minimalist architecture associated with mid-century modern architecture. It was constructed in 1954 and includes an open pavilion connected by a covered walkway to a building for restrooms, changing rooms, and showers. There was also paved plaza, fountain, and landscaped area. Design elements include flat thin roofs on multiple planes, ribbon windows, and a blending of interior and exterior spaces. The bathhouse is made of Ocala block.

During renovation the thin posts were enclosed in concrete and stuccoed. It also suffered a ceiling collapse and underwent restoration.

== Gallery ==
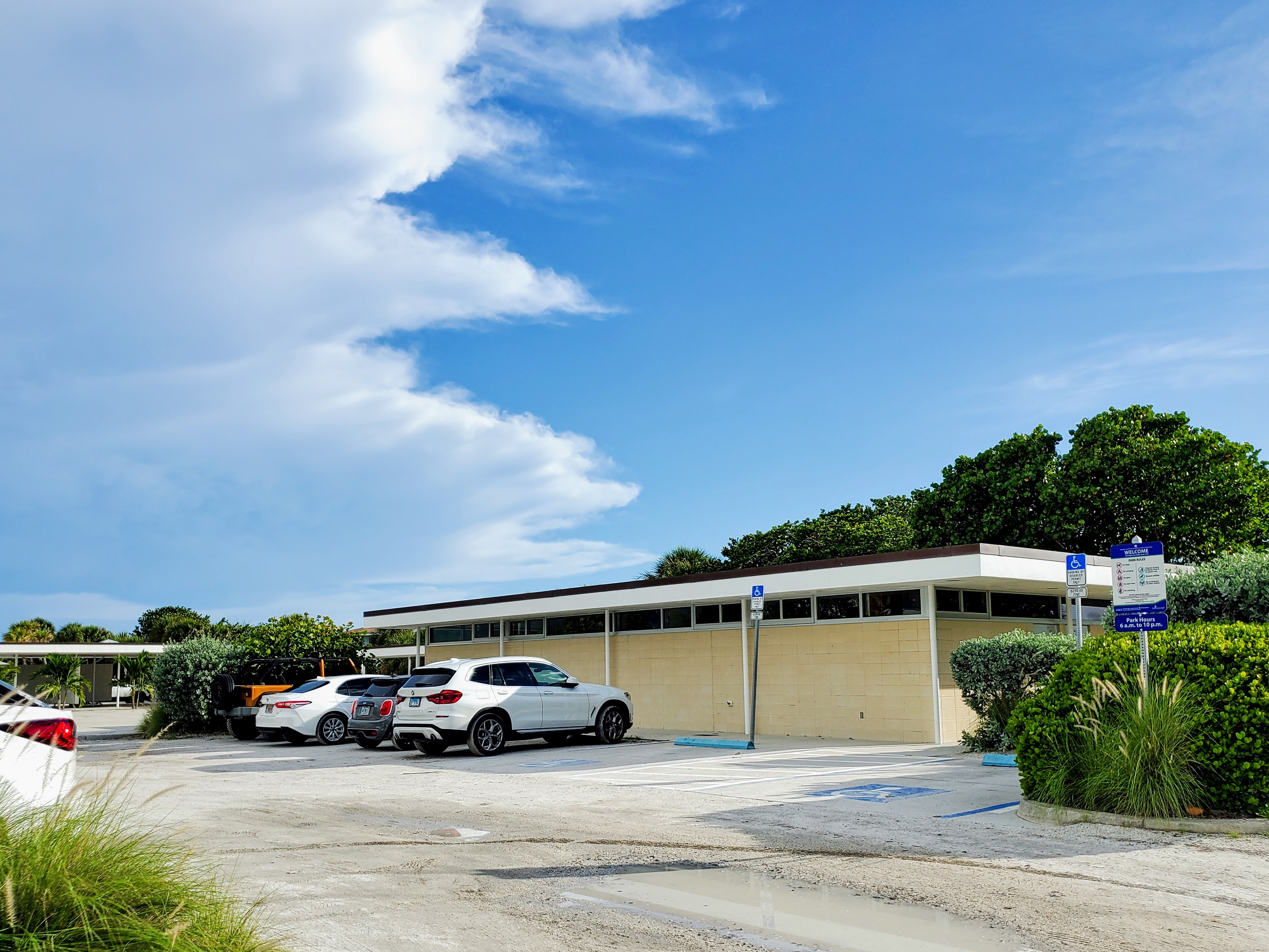
2022

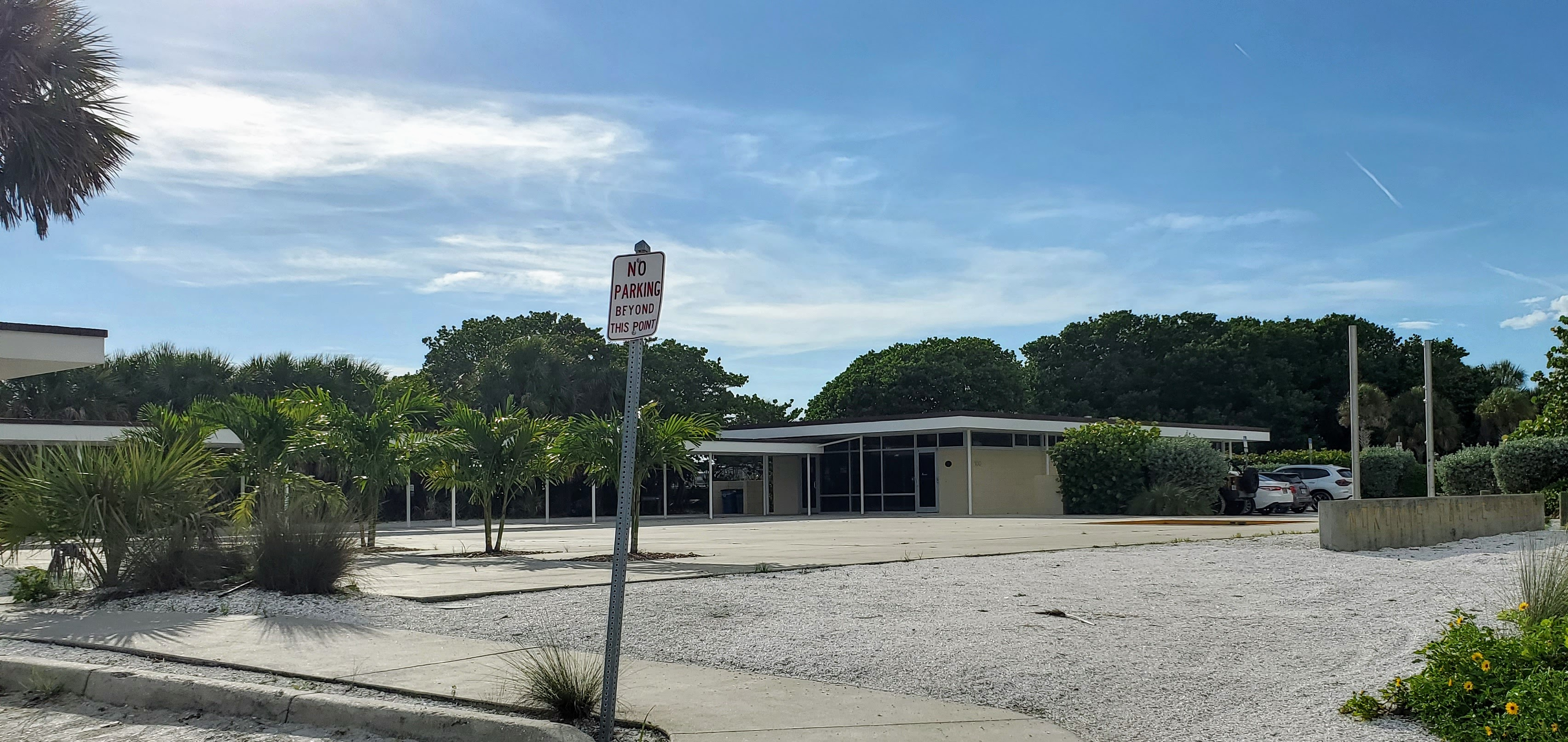
2022
