= Max Strang =

American architect (born 1970)

- Born: Max Wilson Strang; November 18, 1970 (age 55); Winter Haven, Florida, U.S.
- Education: University of Florida, Columbia University
- Occupation: Architect
- Practice: Strang Design
- Buildings: Rock House, Rain Garden, Schokman Education Center, Tarpon Bend Residence, Bolsterli Residence, Strang Residence, Latterner Residence

Max Wilson Strang (born November 18, 1970) is an American architect based in Miami, Florida. Strang is the founding principal of Strang Design (founded in 1998), a South Florida-based architecture firm with offices in Miami, Sarasota, and Winter Haven, Florida. Strang's firm is known for its focus on Regional Modernism (primarily in Florida) and designing with the consideration of the future impact climate change will have on residential and urban development in the coming decades. Strang's architecture is designed to be integrated within South Florida's subtropical climate and is known for fusing build materials like wood, concrete, glass, and metal elements.

== Personal life, career and influences ==
Strang's grandfather, Charles Walton Adams, left Detroit in 1911 and moved to Lake Alfred, Florida, where he grew citrus and was president of Adams Packing Association – one of the first and largest concentrate plants in Florida. He later married Emmie Renyolds Adams and had two children, Mary Reynolds Adams (Strang's biological mother) and Charles Walton Adams Jr. Mary Adams would later marry Carl J. Strang Jr. (Strang's biological father) in Winter Haven, Florida.

Strang (a Florida native) grew up in Winter Haven, Florida, where his parents commissioned a home by Gene Leedy, a recognized member of the Sarasota School of Architecture (SSOA). Strang's personal (and later professional) relationship with Gene Leedy introduced him to the architecture of Paul Rudolph and other SSOA leaders – further influencing Strang's dedication and focus on Regional Modernism, perpetuated through his firm. Strang is a graduate of the University of Florida and Columbia University. Before establishing his firm, he worked in the architecture offices of Gene Leedy, SHoP Architects, and Zaha Hadid Architects.

=== Notable honors and awards ===
- 2022: AIA Miami Firm of the Year
- 2022: AIA Miami Architect of the Year (Max Strang, FAIA)
- 2022: AIA Florida Award of Excellence in Historic Preservation and Restoration (The Gene Leedy House)
- 2021: AIA Miami Award of Excellence: Renovation and Restoration (The Gene Leedy House)
- 2021: AIA Florida Award of Excellence: New Work (Tarpon Bend Residence)
- 2020: AIA Florida Award of Excellence: New Work (Shelter Residence)
- 2020: AIA Florida Unbuilt Award (Leedy Replica – M Series)
- 2019: AIA Florida Medal of Honor for Design (Max Strang, FAIA)
- 2018: AIA Miami Award of Excellence (Mountain Lake Residence)
- 2016: AIA Florida Honor Award for Unbuilt Work (Mola)
- 2016: Induction into AIA College of Fellows (Max Strang, FAIA)
- 2014: AIA Florida Award of Excellence (Biscayne Bay Residence)
- 2013: AIA Miami Silver Medal for Design (Max Strang, AIA)
- 2010: AIA Miami Firm of the Year
- 2007: AIA Miami Young Architect of the Year (Max Strang, AIA)
- 2003: AIA Miami Young Architect of the Year (Max Strang, AIA)

== Approach to sustainability ==
Strang's adoption and adaptation of Regional Modernism (see also Critical Regionalism) is what he calls Environmental Modernism – focusing on the core tenets of the SSOA movement to connect architecture and environment. Strang prioritizes the use of local materials, such as Florida Keystone and Oolitic limestone for South Florida projects, as well as non-local, sustainably focused products. Strang has lectured about Florida's environmental concerns and ‘sea-level rise’, and its associated issues of inland migration while calling attention to the need for sustainable architectural materials and strategies. Strang has openly participated in the dialogue of reducing ‘embodied energy’ in buildings.

Strang's 2016 project, the Net-Zero House, in Miami Beach features 112 photovoltaic panels that feed batteries that is estimated to power the 5,500 square foot building for several months. When discussing the designs of newly built concrete homes on Florida's coastlines, Strang says: "there’s no denying that homes of this size and complexity contain lots of embodied energy. But, to try not to offset embodied energy would just be sitting idly by."

In 2017 Strang partnered with architect Gene Leedy FAIA on a project they called the "reissues" in which Leedy's 1,100-square-foot courtyard home designs were re-envisioned as an alternative to today's larger residences. The project received an award for design excellence from AIA Florida.
