= John Howey =

American architect (1932–2019)

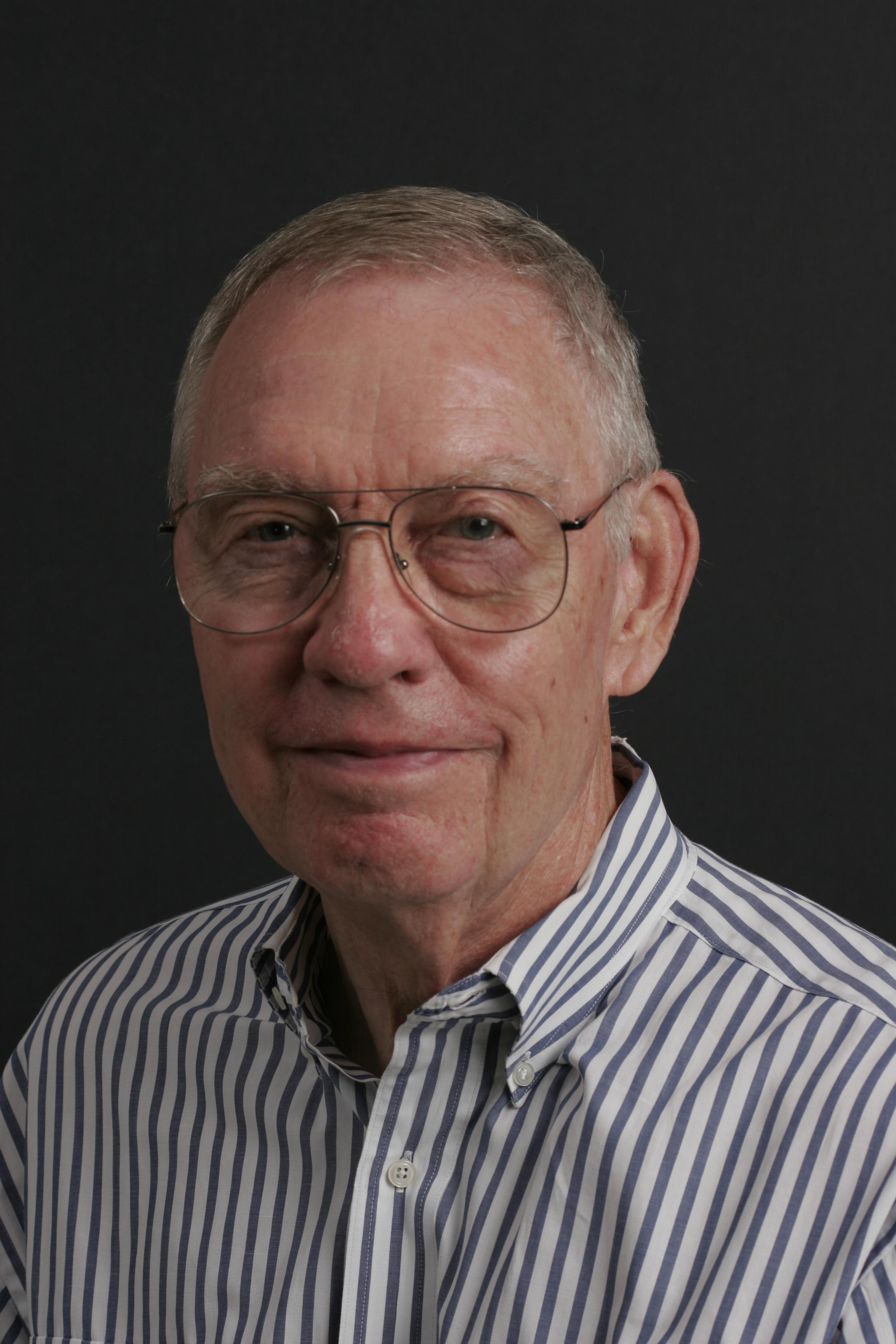
- Occupation: Architect
- Practice: [www.johnhoweyarchitect.com John Howey + Associates]
- Buildings: Tampa City Hall Plaza; Williers Residence; Kennedy Residence; Village Presbyterian Church; CBA Building, University of South Florida; Medical Offices; 101 South Franklin Street

John Howey (1932 – October 26, 2019) was a Florida architect known as part of the group of architects at work since 1965 that followed the Sarasota School of Architects led by Paul Rudolph. John Howey Associates is his Tampa Bay architectural firm formed in 1973. Some of his projects include Tampa City Hall Plaza, Village Presbyterian Church, and the Williers Residence in Tampa. John Howey died on Saturday, October 26, 2019.

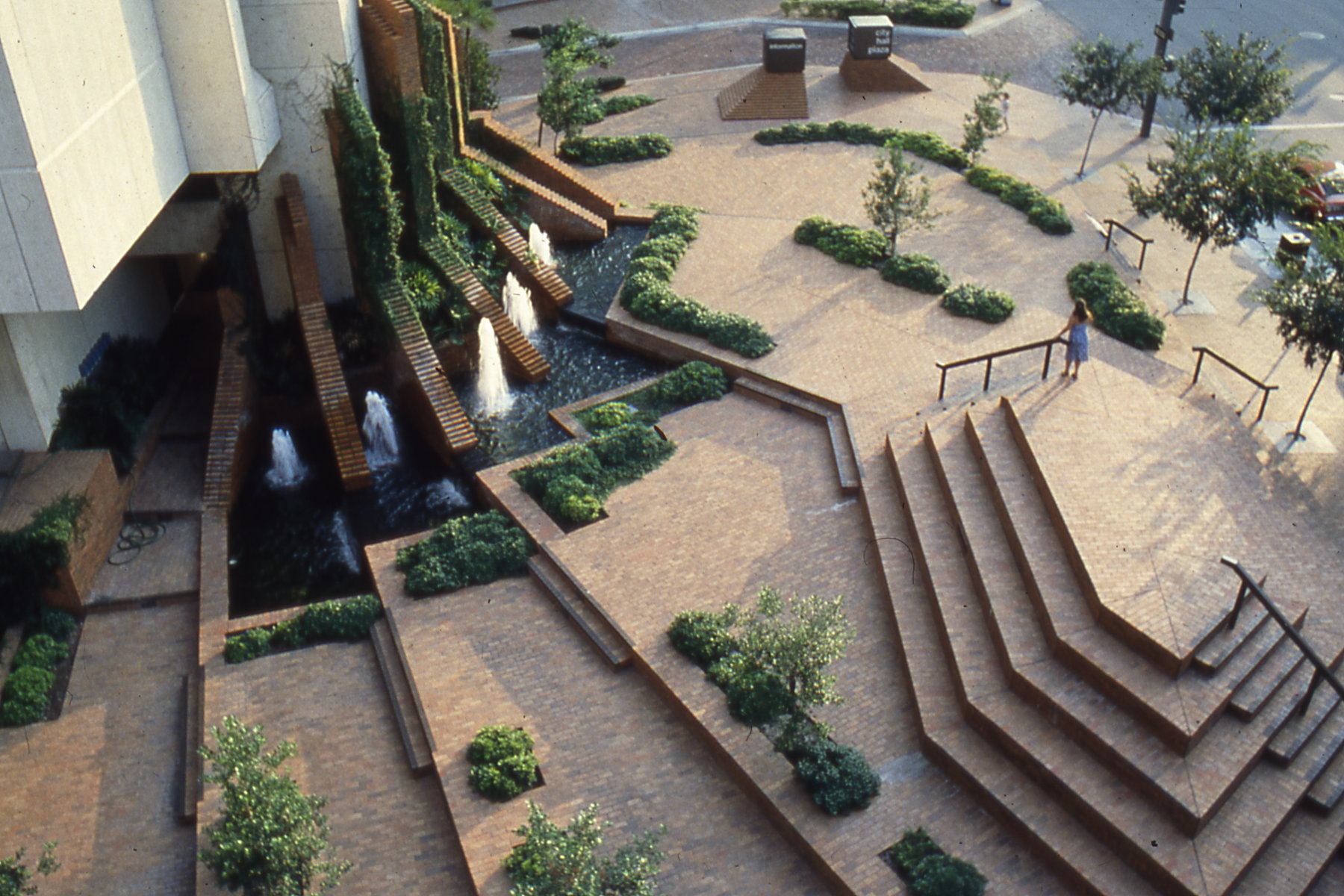
City Hall Plaza, Tampa, FL

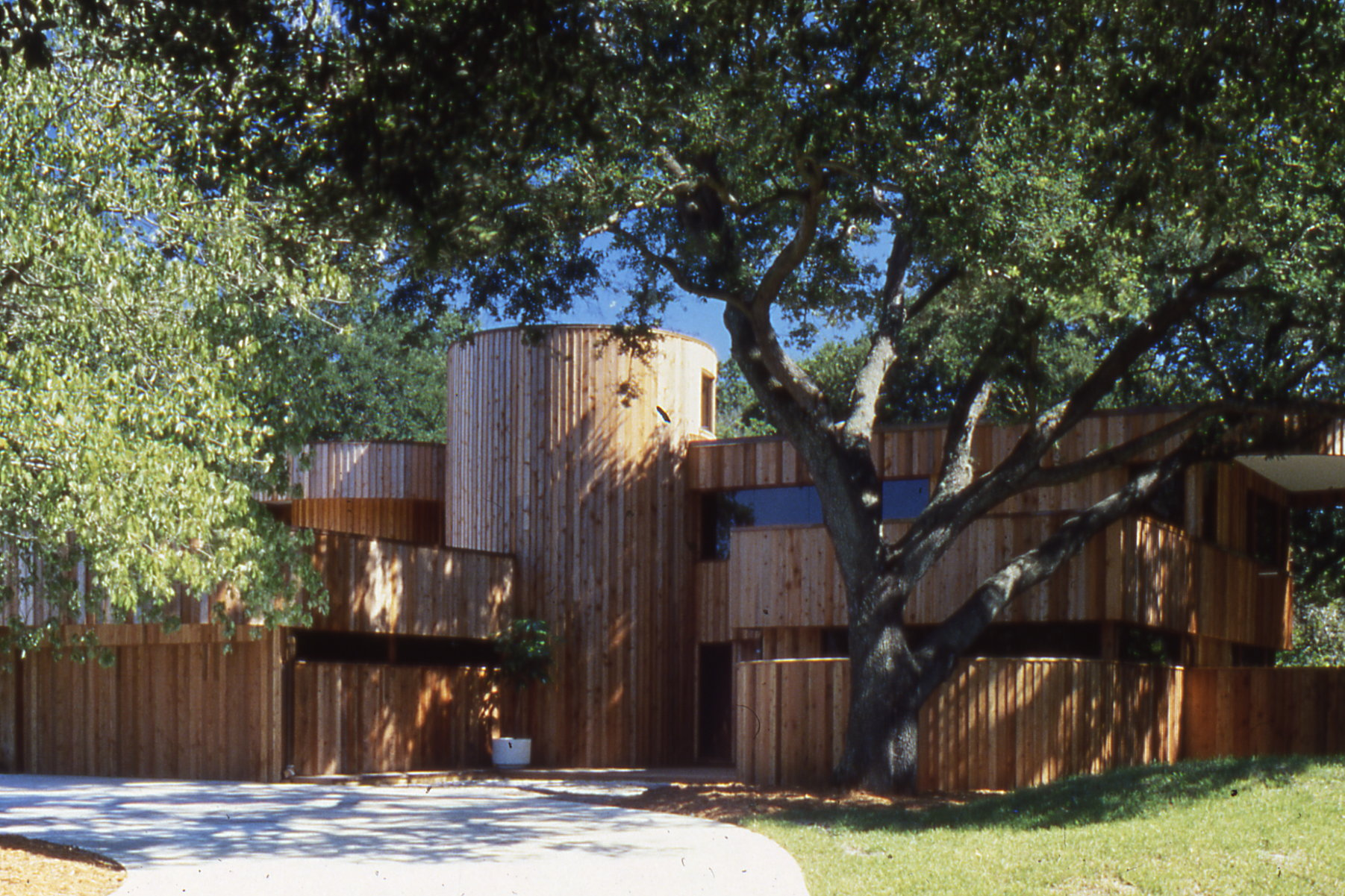
Williers Residence, Tampa, FL

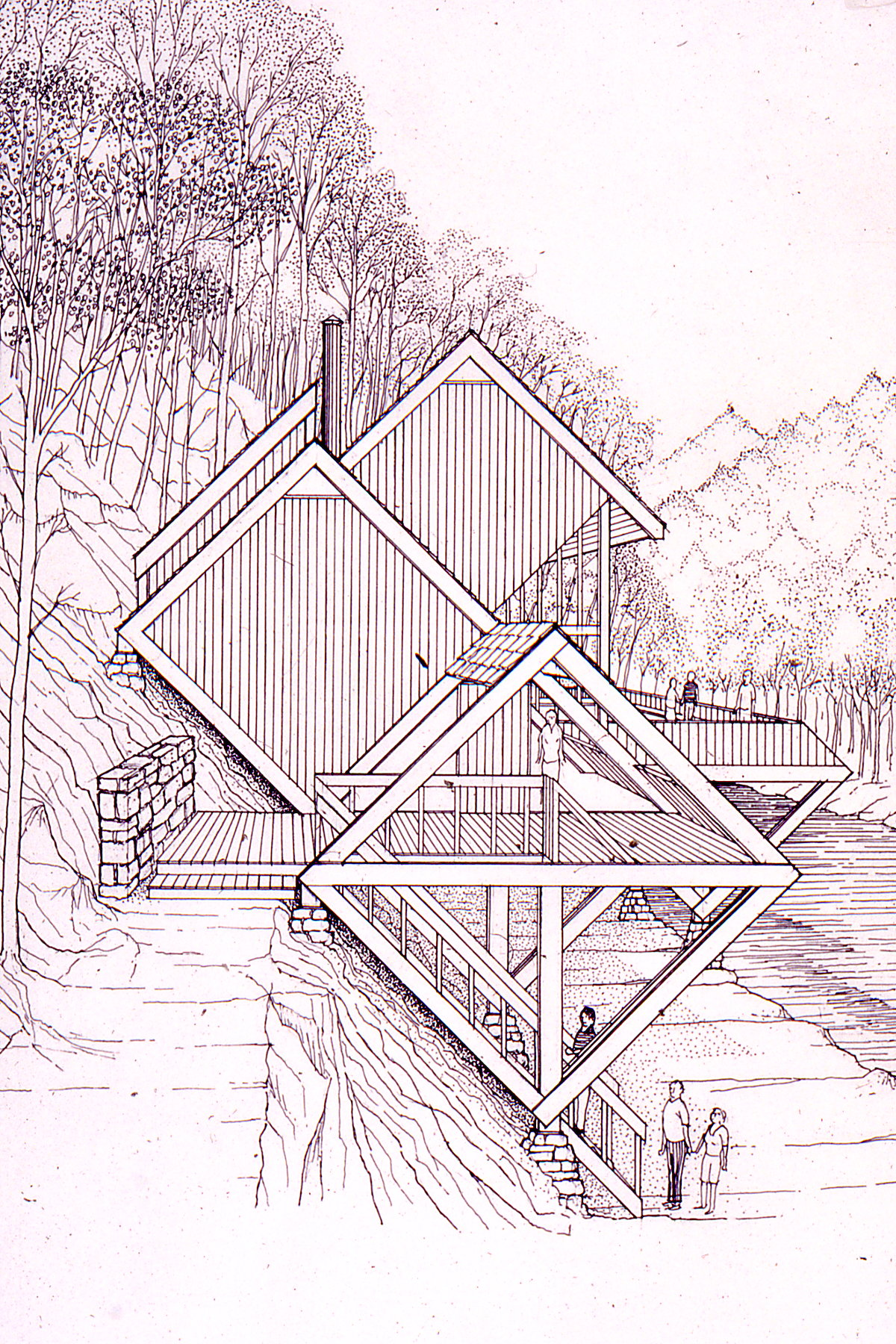
Kennedy Residence, Wesser, NC

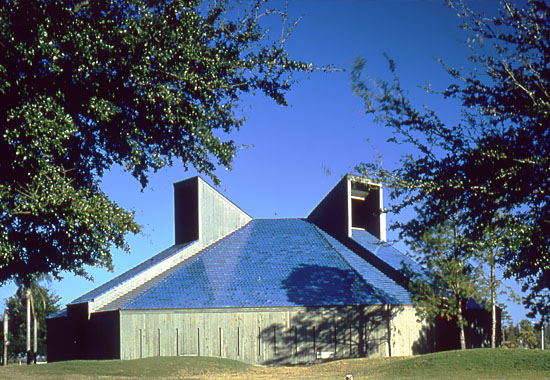
Presbyterian Church, Tampa, FL

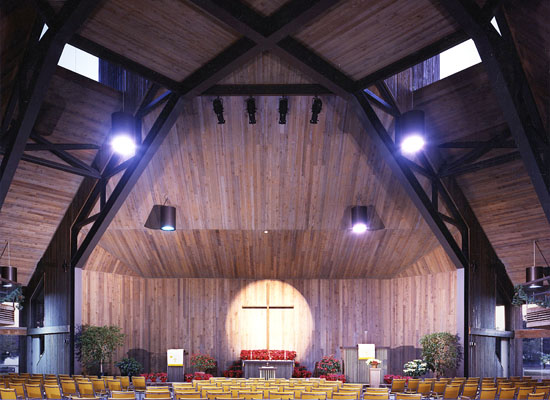
Presbyterian Church Sanctuary, Tampa, FL

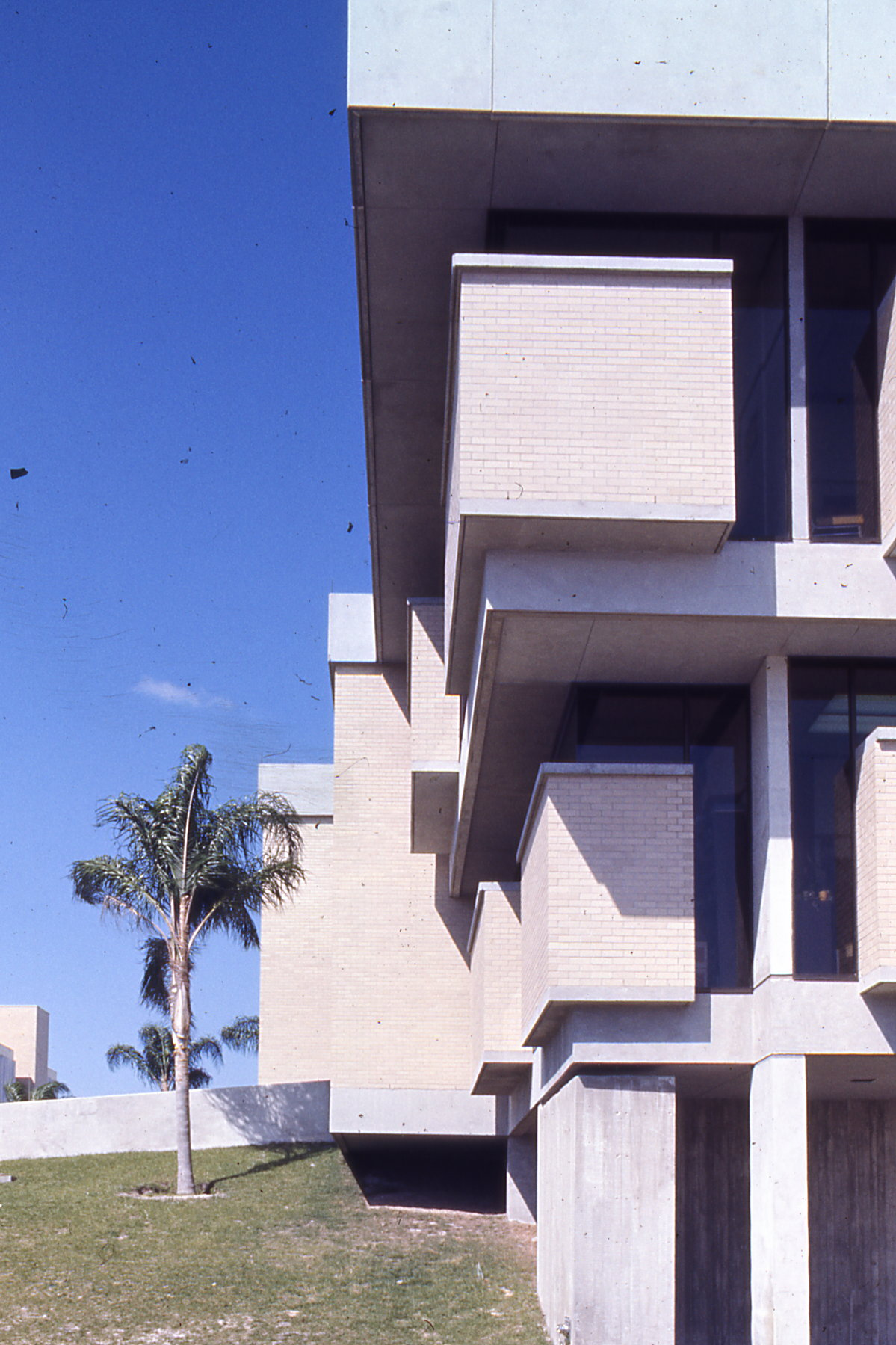
CBA, University of South Florida

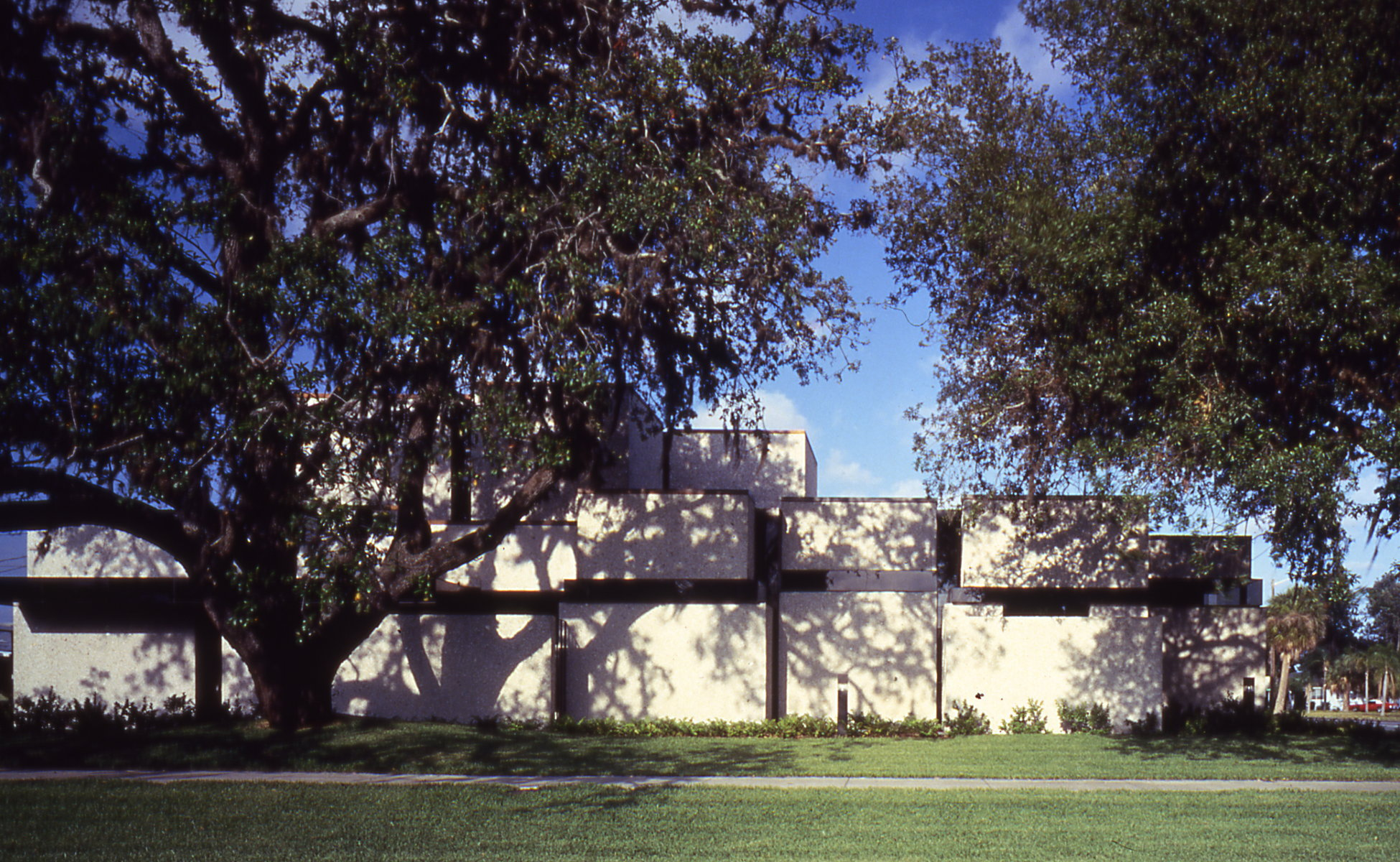
Medical Offices, St. Petersburg, FL

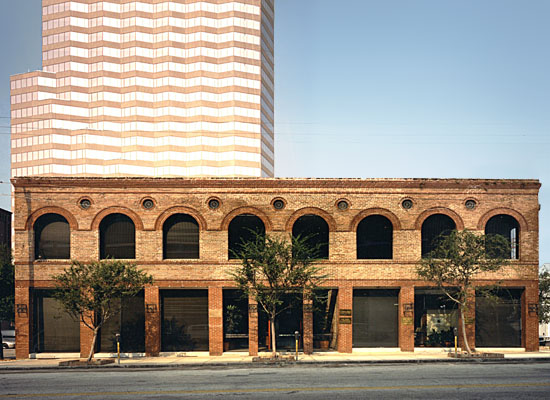
101 South Franklin St. (John Howey + Associates' current office), Tampa, FL

== Notable career achievements ==
=== Honors and awards ===
John Howey Associates has received numerous local, state and American Institute of Architects Design Awards for the Florida/Caribbean Region. In 2000, they received the AIA Award of Honor for Design as one of Florida top design firms of the 20th century. Their work has been exhibited at Selby Gallery and New College, Sarasota; Tampa Bay AIA Gallery; and at the AIA National Convention, Orlando, as well as the AIA Regional Convention Tour of Homes, Tampa. John Howey was selected for AIA’s most prestigious honor, the designation as a Fellow of the American Institute of Architects.

== Publications ==
Howey has published numerous articles and two books: The Sarasota School of Architecture (M.I.T. Press, 1995) and Florida Architecture, A Celebration (A.I.A. Florida, 2000). Recognition of his work has been widespread, from the New York Times and the Architectural Review (London) to the Images Publishing Group in Australia.

== Significant works ==
Howey began his practice in Tampa, Florida, in 1965 after winning a design competition for a waterfront residence on Tampa Bay. His work includes public and private architecture, historic preservation, interior design, and planning.

- Tampa City Hall Plaza, Tampa, Florida – The brick topography was designed to be a welcoming and gathering point for Tampa's outdoor events.
- Williers Residence, Tampa, Florida – This residence is made up of two zones connected by a bridge with continuous bands of glass for views of the mature oak trees and other natural landscaping.
- Kennedy Residence, Wesser, North Carolina – The residence sits on a 45 degree slope of rock outcroppings which function as part of the walls and floors.
- Presbyterian Church, Tampa, Florida – The octagonal sanctuary has a focal design element made from four skylights that provide indirect daylight inside.
- CBA Building, University of South Florida, Tampa, Florida – A 34,000 square feet multi-use college building to hold classrooms as well as faculty offices.
- Medical Offices, St. Petersburg, Florida – High horizontal bands of glass window boxes intersect with the ceiling grid, which also features continuous strips of glass.
- 101 South Franklin Street, Tampa, Florida – The 13,700 square feet existing 100+ year old brick building was restored and renovated into office and retail space.
