= Gene Leedy =

American architect (1928–2018)

- Born: February 6, 1928; Isaban, West Virginia
- Died: November 24, 2018 (aged 90); Winter Haven, Florida
- Occupation: Architect
- Practice: Gene Leedy Architect FAIA
- Buildings: University of South Florida President's Home, Winter Haven City Hall, Syd Solomon Residence & Studio, Strang Residence, American National Bank
- Website: geneleedy.com

Gene Leedy (February 6, 1928 – November 24, 2018) was an American architect based in Winter Haven, Florida. He was a pioneer of the modern movement in Florida and later a founder of the Sarasota School of Architecture, whose members included Paul Rudolph, Victor Lundy, and others. After beginning his career in Sarasota, Leedy moved his practice to Winter Haven in 1954. He is best known for his bold use of exposed structural systems of precast concrete, especially in long-span, "double-tee" structural elements, as well as enclosed courtyards, flat roofs, and floor-to-ceiling sliding glass doors.

== Personal life ==
Gene Leedy was born on February 6, 1928, in Isaban, West Virginia to Cecil Hudgins Leedy and Ethyl Ferguson Leedy. Leedy's Father was a supervisor for a coal mining company, and Ethyl was a teacher in a one-room schoolhouse. The family moved to Gainesville, Florida, and Leedy's father opened a small restaurant. At 16 years old, Leedy attended the University of Florida in Gainesville, graduating in 1950 with a Bachelor of Architecture degree. Shortly after graduating, he married Kathryn "Bebe" Hoge, (who was from Tampa, Florida). After their wedding in Arlington, Virginia, the couple settled in Florida, first in Sarasota, where Leedy was employed by Ralph and William Zimmerman and later by Paul Rudolph, before being called to military service. In 1954, Leedy and his wife relocated back to Sarasota where he opened his own architectural office and then later moved his practice and family to Winter Haven, Florida.

Leedy's first son, Robert Hoge Leedy, was born in Winter Haven on October 17, 1956. In 1958, Leedy and Kathryn "Bebe" Hoge divorced. On March 6, 1960, Leedy later marries Marjorie Frances Ingram, still residing in Winter Haven along with Marjorie's daughter (from her prior marriage), Helen Isabel King (born August 27, 1954). Leedy's daughter, Marjorie "Saffie" Leedy, was born on October 25, 1962, and Leedy's second son, Gene Ingram Leedy, was born on November 1, 1969. Leedy's wife, Marjorie, died on Christmas Day 2010 in Winter Haven. Leedy eventually died November 24, 2018, at the age of 90, in Winter Haven, Florida and was survived by his four children.

Leedy was good friends with Robert Parsons, Gram Parsons' adoptive father. Leedy is quoted multiple times discussing his friendship with the Parsons' in the novel about Gram Parsons life titled Twenty Thousand Roads: The Ballad of Gram Parsons and His Cosmic American Music. In the novel, Leedy tells a story in which Robert Parsons' approached Leedy with the opportunity to buy his silver Jaguar sports car for twenty-five thousand dollars to pay for Gram Parsons' tuition to Harvard.

== Notable career achievements ==
Leedy was selected as one of Architectural Record's successful young architects in 1965 with a published portfolio of his work. In 1988, he was awarded the lifetime design achievement award from the Florida Association of Architects. He was inducted into the College of Fellows of the American Institute of Architects in 1992, and received the outstanding alumni award from the College of Architecture of the University of Florida in 1993. His work has been extensively published in the U.S. and Europe and has received more than 50 architectural awards both nationally and statewide.

In addition to projects throughout the U.S., including Hawaii, he designed a large housing complex for the government of Malaysia. He was also a design consultant for Alfred A. Yee and Associates, Architects and Engineers, Honolulu, Hawaii for more than 25 years. Among Leedy's notable former employees and "award winning protégées" are architects Lawrence Scarpa and Max Strang, whose firm (Strang Design), collaborated with Alive Coverage on The Gene Leedy Influence. This short film is about a house designed by Gene Leedy (now called the Gene Leedy House) in 1956 in Winter Haven, Florida, which was his own family residence.

The Gene Leedy House was one of twelve homes part of the Craney Spec Homes development — a 1956 residential grouping of twelve small homes manifested through a collaboration between Gene Leedy and a local Winter Haven developer, Dick Craney. One of the homes was purchased by Leedy and his family, where they lived for the remainder of their lives. Leedy's goal for these spec homes was to prove that an inexpensive home can have charm and dignity akin to what expensive custom-designed homes provide. The Craney Spec Homes are now recognized as a National Historic District. The Gene Leedy House was recently restored and is managed by Double T (a non-profit organization) — providing public access through tours, events and a residency.

=== Honors and awards ===
1988 - Medal of Honor for Design - Florida Chapter of the American Institute of Architects

1993 - Outstanding Alumni Award, School of Architecture, University of Florida Gainesville, Florida

1992 - Installed into the College of Fellows, American Institute of Architects (AIA)

== Significant works ==
=== Commercial projects ===
- Cypress Gardens Bank, Winter Haven, Florida, 1965
- City Hall, Winter Haven, Florida, 1960
- Gene Leedy Architectural Office, Winter Haven, Florida, 1961
- Keiltronix Office Building, Charlotte, North Carolina, 1987
- Taxdal Medical Center, Winter Haven, Florida, 1986
- Flagship Bank, Orlando, Florida, 1975
- Chamber of Commerce, Winter Haven, Florida, 1990
- Walden Lake Country Club, Plant City, Florida 1985
- Commerce Bank of Central Florida, Winter Haven, Florida 1990
- American National Bank, Winter Haven, Florida, 1962
- Brentwood Elementary School, Sarasota, Florida, 1958
- First National Bank of Cape Canaveral, Cape Canaveral, FL 1963

=== Residential projects ===
- House for Contemporary Builders, Sarasota, Florida, 1950
- Craney Homes, Inc, Winter Haven, Florida, 1956
- Weaving/Thomasson house, Winter Haven, Florida, 1956
- Navickas Residence, Winter Haven, Florida, 1957
- Dormon Residence, Winter Haven, Florida, 1963
- Builder's House for Levitt & Sons Inc, Rockledge, Florida, 1964
- Libby Residence, Winter Park, Florida, 1957
- Sands Residence, Winter Haven, Florida, 1965
- S.A.E. Fraternity House, University of Florida, Gainesville, Florida, 1963
- Sparrow Residence, Winter Haven, Florida, 1954
- Azalea Place Townhouses, Winter Park, Florida, 1982
- Brogden Residence, Winter Haven, Florida, 1979
- Miller Residence, Plant City, Florida, 1985
- Carlton Beach House, Boca Grande, Florida, 1985
- Dean Residence, Winter Haven, Florida 1983
- De Pree Residence, Marco Island, Florida 1979
- Garcia Residence, Anna Maria Island, Florida, 1995
- Keilhack Residence, Charlotte, North Carolina, 1979
- Leedy Residence, Winter Haven, Florida, 1956 (Addition in 1998)
- Leedy Beach House, Casey Key, Florida, 1985 (Renovation)
- Lifsey President's House, University of South Florida, Tampa, Florida 1994
- Smith Beach House, Boca Grande, Florida, 1985
- Solomon Residence & Studio, Siesta Key, Florida, 1970
- Strang Residence, Winter Haven, Florida, 1970
- Strasberg Residence, Longwood, Florida, 1982
