= Syd Solomon =

American artist (1917–2004)

- Born: July 12, 1917; Uniontown, Pennsylvania, U.S.
- Died: January 28, 2004 (age 86); Sarasota, Florida
- Education: Art Institute of Chicago, L’Ecole des Beaux-Arts
- Known for: Painter
- Movement: Abstract expressionism

Syd Solomon (July 12, 1917 – January 28, 2004) was an American abstract artist. He spent most of his time in his homes in both East Hampton, NY and Sarasota, Florida, both of which influenced many of his paintings. His works have been presented at The Guggenheim, The Whitney, Corcoran Gallery of Art, The Wadsworth Athenaeum and several others.

== Early life ==
Solomon was born in Uniontown, Pennsylvania, to a Jewish family. He started painting in high school. After high school, he studied art at the Art Institute of Chicago from 1935 to 1938. In 1940, he enlisted in the Engineer Aviation Regiment, First Camouflage Battalion of the military. During this time, Solomon helped design camouflage for the California coast near the San Francisco area. Later he was assigned to the Royal Engineer Camouflage Corps in London, where he designed camouflage to be used against the Germans in World War II. He went on to earn the Bronze star for his contributions during the Battle of the Bulge. During his time in London, he mostly performed aerial reconnaissance, which inspired his ideas on abstract art. After leaving the military, he went on to attend classes at the French art school L’Ecole des Beaux-Arts in 1945.

== Late life ==
Solomon and his wife Annie moved to Sarasota, Florida, in 1946. Sarasota is home to the Ringling Museum of Art where Solomon first began displaying his work. His was the first work by a contemporary artist to be displayed in the museum. His work was quickly noticed by other artists and curators.

Solomon's art was included in several national exhibitions throughout the 1950s. In 1955, the couple first visited East Hampton, New York, which soon after became their second home. By 1959, the Solomons had developed the ritual of spending winter and spring in Sarasota and then autumn in the Hamptons. Solomon continued this dual lifestyle for the next 30 years. The environmental settings of his two homes worked as inspiration for his paintings. By this point, the Solomon family had grown to include a daughter, Michele, and later a son, Michael. By 1959 the artist had begun regular showings at the Saidenberg Gallery in New York while also doing shows in both the Hamptons and Miami.

In the 1960s, Solomon's reputation reached a high point and he was being shown at many of the finest museums in the world. In 1961 he received several awards and accolades including the 13th New England Annual and the Painting of the Year from the Whitney Museum of American Art. This popularity made him an influential personality in both his Hamptons and Sarasota communities. He helped bring many well-established artists down to Florida after he started his Institute of Fine Art at New College. These artists included James Brooks, Larry Rivers, and Conrad Marca-Relli. The Solomon home in the Hamptons had become a sort of cultural gathering spot for many famous artist and writers.

In 1970, Solomon, with the help of architect Gene Leedy, built his award-winning home and studio on Siesta Key in Sarasota. In 1975 the New York Cultural Center and the Ringling Museum held retrospective exhibitions of the artist's works.

Around 1990, Solomon began to display symptoms of Alzheimer's disease. After a long battle with the disease, Solomon died on January 24, 2004, at 86 years old. He died at Sarasota, Florida.

== Style ==
After the 1950s, Solomon's style became heavily influenced by nature. His works illustrate his fascination with the climatic and overall environmental conditions of land, sea, and sky. In the 1960s he started using polymer tempera as a base and would then combine it with various colored inks and oils. Solomon was also one of the premier artists to use acrylic paint. He became a fan of a specific resist technique that used a lactic caseing solution to mask the painting. His painting gestures usually consisted of circles, squares, and curves. Solomon was not concerned with perfection in his art strokes as much as rough edges that left for unpredictability. Although he used a range of colors in his paintings, the color black has always played a big part in his work.

== Career/achievements ==
Throughout his life Solomon taught at many different institutions, including the Pittsburgh Art Institute, the Ringling Museum of Art, the Famous Artists School, New College in Sarasota, and the Sarasota School of Art. He was also a visiting instructor at University of Illinois in Urbana, Robertson Center for the Arts, and the Tampa Bay Art Center.

He also received many awards in his lifetime including the State Department U.S. Cultural Exchange program to Israel and the Ford Foundation Special Purchase Grant for the Guggenheim Museum. Also he received the Painting of the year from the Whitney as well as the 13th New England Annual.

== Exhibitions/collections ==
Museums	Galleries	Other	
Clearwater Museum of Art	Museum of Fine Arts Saint Petersburg, Florida	Lowe Art Gallery	Brevard College
Fifty Ninth Annual Exhibition at the National Collection of Fine Arts1956	Associated American Artists Galleries	Paintings of the Circus at Sarasota Art Association	
Whitney Museum of American Art	Saidenberg Gallery	Annual Exhibition at the American Water Color Society 1955	
Ringling Museum of Art	Trend House Gallery	Colorado Springs Fine Arts Center	

Collections
Adelphi University
Baltimore Museum of Art
Chrysler Art Museum
Guggenheim Museum
High Museum of Art
New Orleans Museum of Art
Wadsworth Museum
Whitney Museum of American Art
Witte Memorial Museum
