= Sanderling Beach Club =

- U.S. National Register of Historic Places
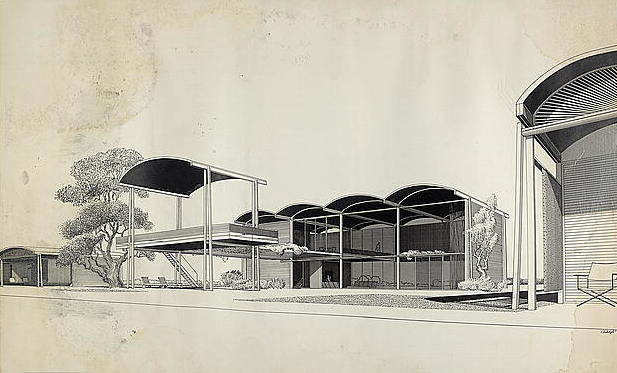

- Location within Florida Location within the United States
- Location: Sarasota, Sarasota County, Florida
- Coordinates: 27°14′26″N 82°31′55″W
- Built: 1952
- Architect: Paul Rudolph
- Architectural style: Sarasota School of Architecture
- NRHP reference No.: 94000618
- Added to NRHP: June 29, 1994

The Sanderling Beach Club is a historic Sarasota School of Architecture building in Sarasota, Florida, United States. It was designed in 1952 by architect Paul Rudolph.

The club is located at 7400 Sanderling Road, Sarasota. On June 29, 1994, it was added to the U.S. National Register of Historic Places.

== Construction ==
The roof of each structure consists of a series of low vaulted ceilings, constructed of two thin layers of plywood sheathing. The general contractor for Sanderling was James Stroud, who built other Rudolph projects such as the 1957 Harkavy Residence and the 1953 Davis Residence.

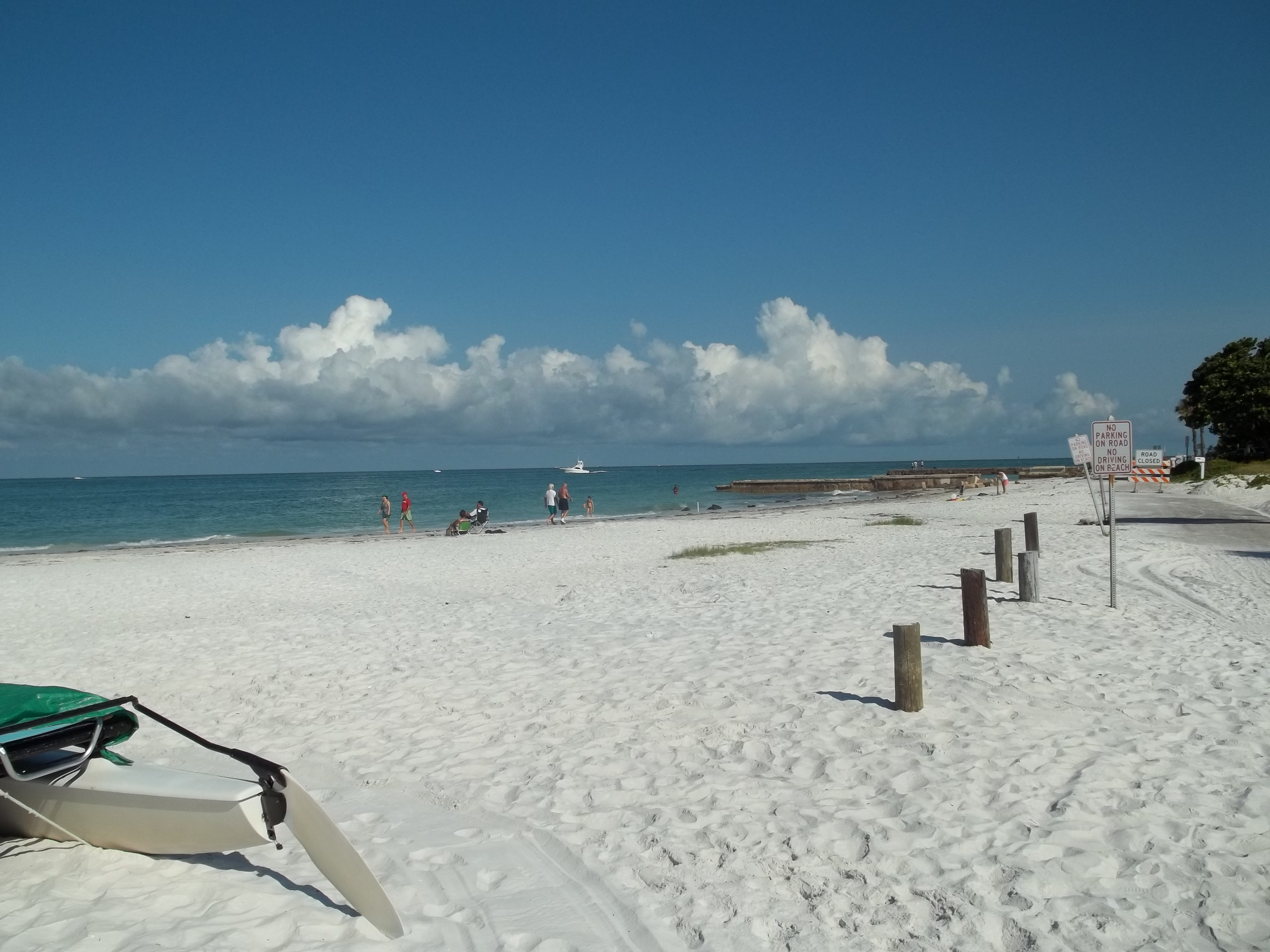
Sanderling Beach
