= Revere Quality House =

- Revere Quality Institute House
- U.S. National Register of Historic Places
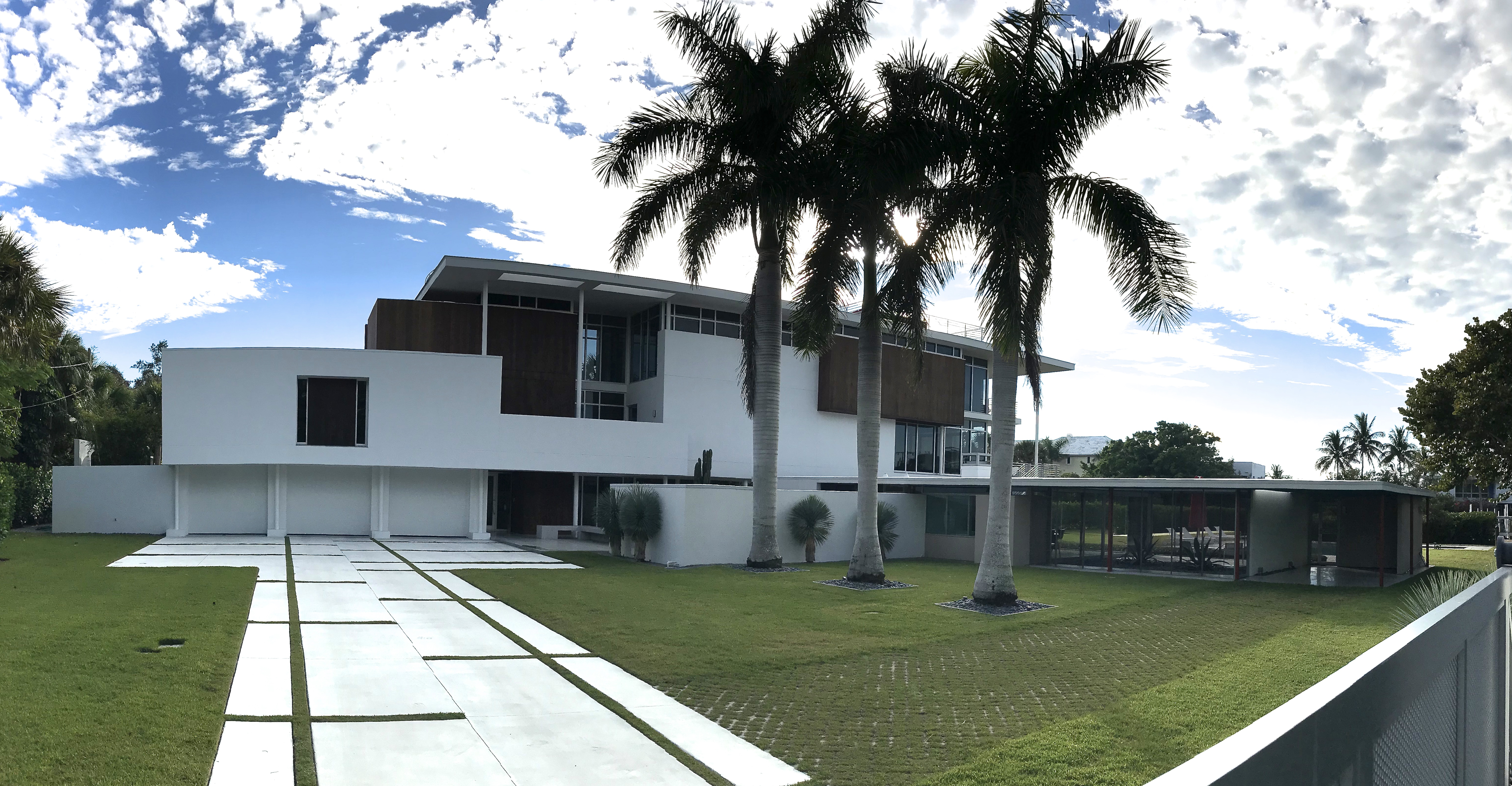
- Revere Quality House (1948) and Companion House (2007)

- Location within Florida Location within the United States
- Nearest city: Sarasota, Florida
- Coordinates: 27°18′3″N 82°33′32″W
- Built: 1948
- Architect: Paul Rudolph (architect) and Ralph Twitchell (addition by Guy Peterson)
- Architectural style: Modern, Sarasota School
- Restored: 2007
- MPS: Sarasota School of Architecture MPS
- NRHP reference No.: 07001200

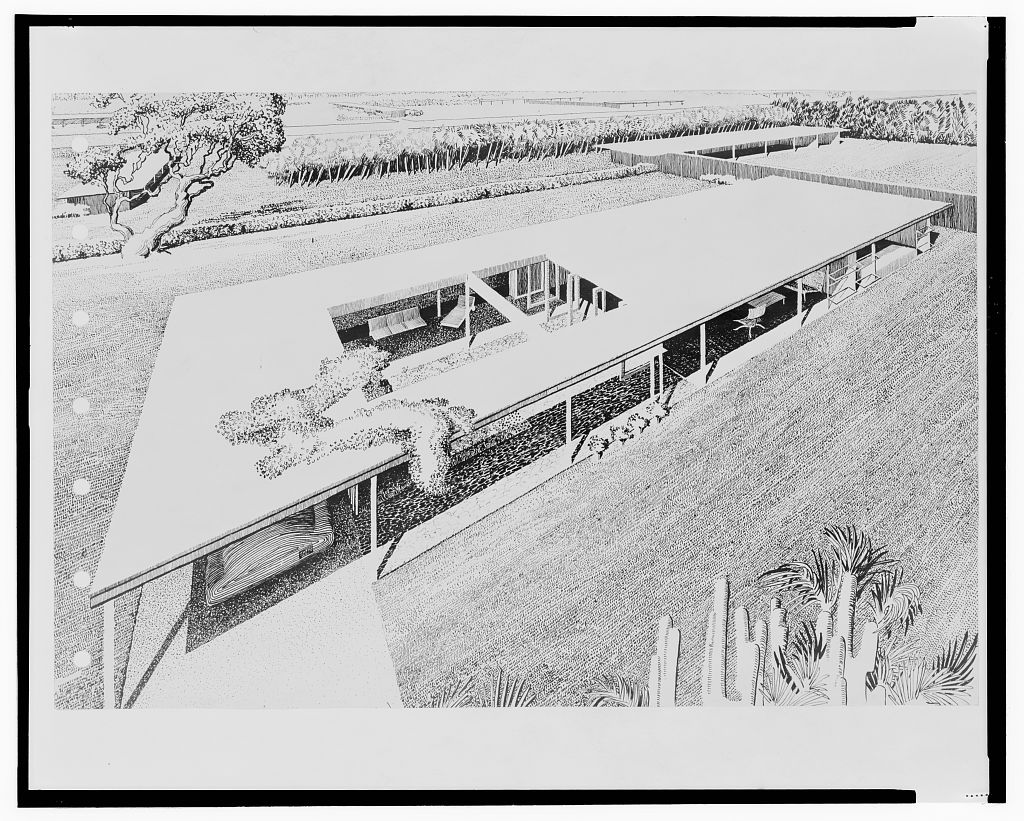
Revere Quality House - Aerial Paul Rudolph, Architect.

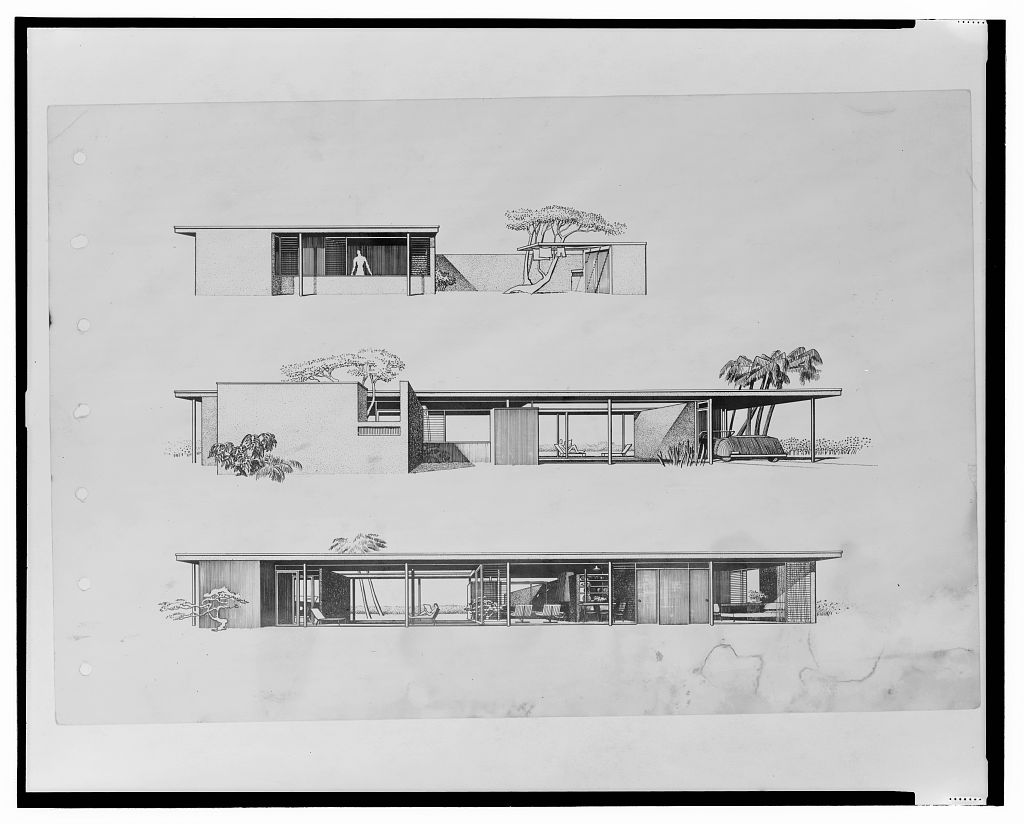
Revere Quality House - Elevations Paul Rudolph, Architect.

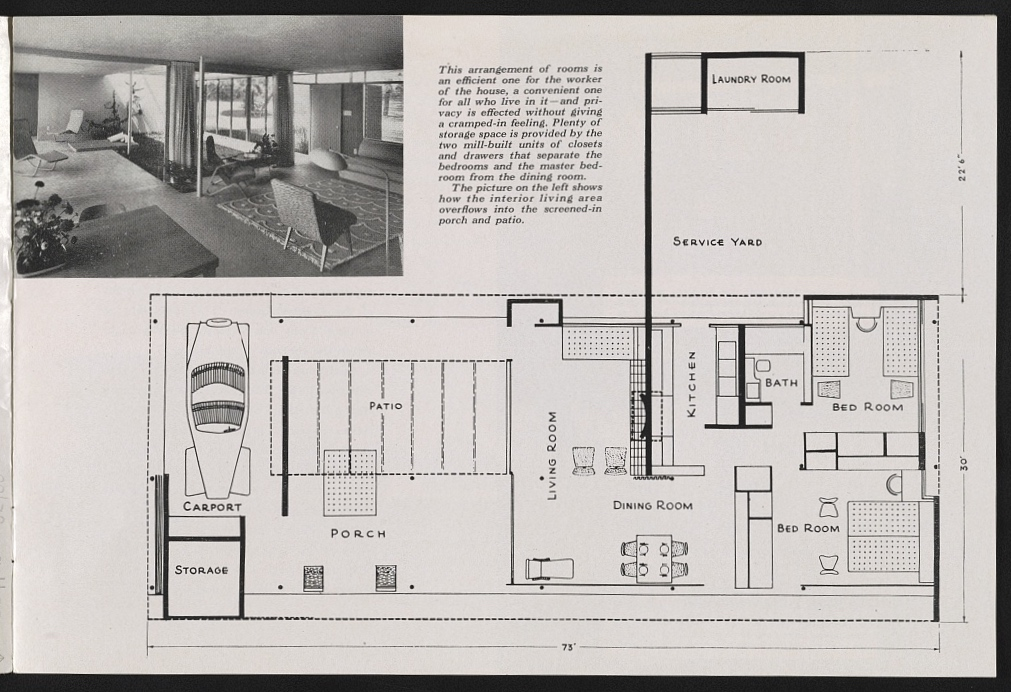
Revere Quality House - Floor Plan Paul Rudolph, Architect.

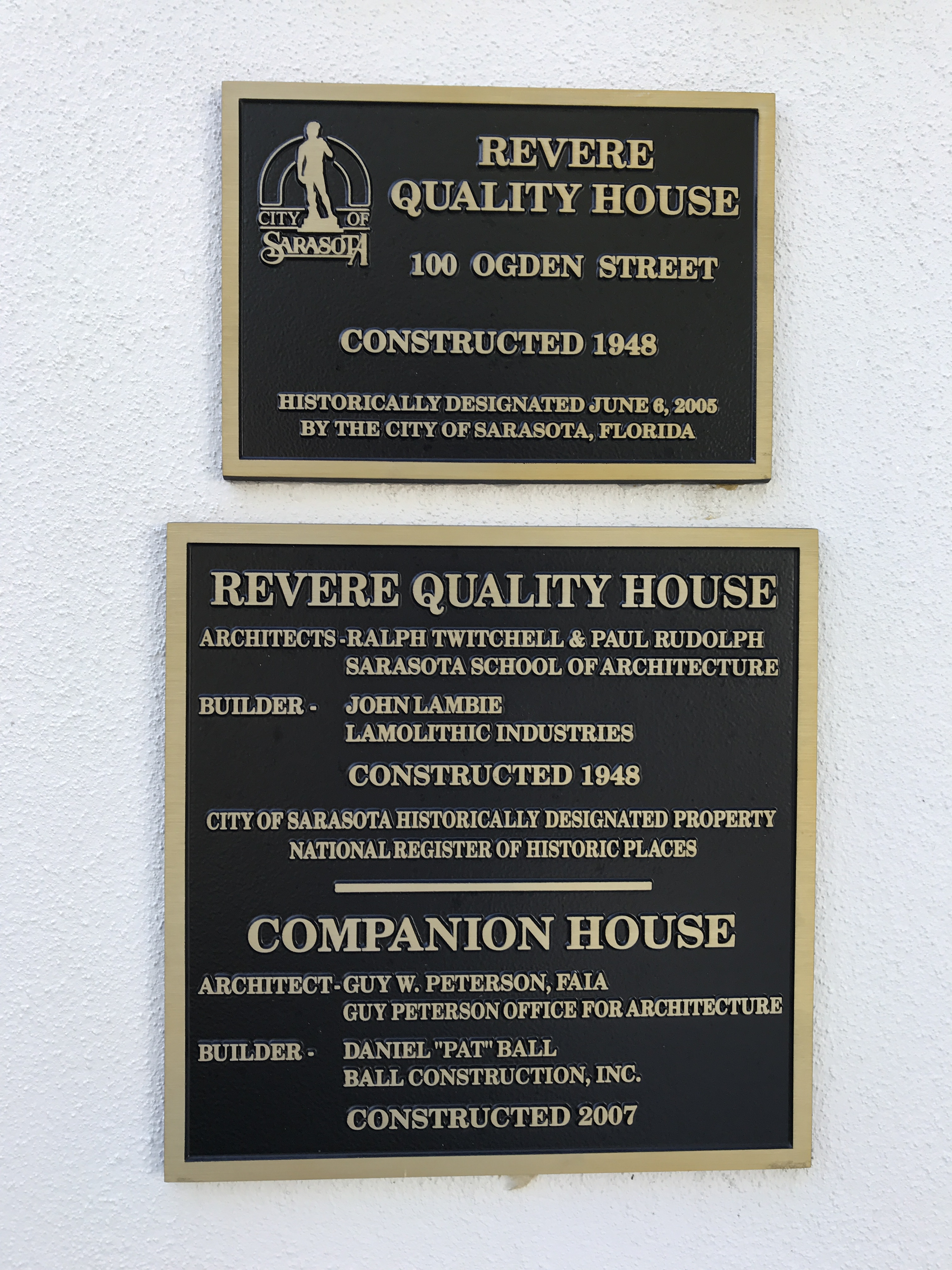

The Revere Quality House is a house located in Siesta Key, Florida that was designed by architects Paul Rudolph and Ralph Twitchell. It is a breakthrough in twentieth-century residential architecture which blends elements of the International Style with site-sensitive design that is considered one of the notable examples of the Sarasota School of Architecture. The house represents a substantial advancement in how people should live within their environment, and established a new paradigm in tropical home construction.

== The Revere Quality Institute ==
The Revere Quality Institute was a consortium of the Revere Copper Company, Architectural Forum magazine, and select architects and builders across the country. It was established during the post-war building boom of the late 1940s, with the goal of promoting the development of bold, new, creative, and affordable approaches to residential living. This would be accomplished by building prototype homes in select cities across the country. These designs would promote the use of new, lower-cost, synthetic and re-engineered materials. Paul Rudolph was encouraged by a publisher in New York City to participate, and was offered one of the projects for the firm of Twitchell and Rudolph of Sarasota, Florida. Their project would be the third of eight homes planned for 1948.

== Developing the concept ==
Roberta Finney was a local patron and friend of Ralph Twitchell. She provided a large flat plot of land on Siesta Key, near a bayou that spilled out onto the Gulf of Mexico. This location would facilitate any number of design approaches.

Although both Twitchell and Rudolph were architects, the two had established a unique relationship where Rudolph generally produced conceptual designs, while Twitchell translated them into buildable plans and managed construction. For most of the project, Rudolph worked out of his office in New York City and sent them to Sarasota for review.

In 1948, Rudolph traveled to Europe as part of a Harvard architecture fellowship. He was struck by the scale and construction of European urban design. He became particularly interested in the transposition of structures and integration of inner and outer space. This was reflected in his first (and most grand) concept for the Revere project, a large open plan covering the entire lot, with six detached but intertwined homes. It featured a shared public space and parking area, all surrounded by a six foot high wall. This initial idea was dismissed in favor of a traditional single-house suburban plan. A variation of this urban concept was redeveloped into the Lamolithic Houses of Siesta Key, completed by Twitchell and Rudolph later that year.

Going back to the drawing board, Rudolph produced a new plan, loosely based on the Mies van der Rohe (Barcelona Pavilion); a scaled-down (1,000 square foot), linear, flat-roof, single-story structure, to be constructed almost entirely of concrete and glass. The low roof (less than eight and a half feet off the ground) would be supported by steel perimeter poles, and extend beyond the frame of the house to create overhangs for shade. At one end, the roof overhang would extend several feet to serve as a carport. The exterior walls were to be made of lamolithic panels, as well as floor-to-ceiling sliding glass doors that would open onto large exterior patio areas. Jalousie windows were strategically positioned to promote natural ventilation and cooling. A hole would be cut into the roof to bring light into an incorporated screened-in porch (with grass inside) to further intermingle interior and exterior space.

The floor plan was simple and functional, highlighting a single space that conceptually consolidated living, dining, and patio areas. One of the walls would incorporate a large copper-hooded fireplace (provided by Revere Copper and Brass Company). This ‘great room’ would constitute more than half of the interior capacity of the house. A small galley kitchen was positioned behind a partition wall, along with a narrow hallway that led to two corner bedrooms and shared bath.

It was a radical plan at the time, and to create it would require new building applications and methods.

== Implementing new construction techniques ==
Twitchell had been experimenting with reinforced concrete construction since the late 1930s. His friend and associate, John Lambie, was a local concrete supplier who was developing a method steel-reinforced cast-in-place concrete, called lamolithic construction. For the Revere House roof, Lambie used mobile concrete mixing machines and pumping equipment to pour the material into reusable steel forms set on lally steel poles. Slender steel reinforcement rods were used to hold the elevated slab together. Lambie ingeniously poured the roof with cavities on its upper surface to lighten its weight. He filled the cavities with crushed shell that would collect moisture and create a permeating cooling effect into the home. It represented a milestone in passive environmental engineering.

The use of reinforced concrete as a viable substrate proved to be very expensive. Jack West, who was working as a draftsman for Twitchell during the project, acknowledged that the original $14,000 budget for the Revere House doubled to $28,000 by the time the house was completed.

The floors were poured terrazzo. Interior wall dividers were fabricated of meticulously sanded plywood, some of which featured built-in cabinets and drawers (with leather pulls). Wood-framed sliding glass doors were hand-fabricated on site. Ceilings in the great room were painted a bright 'peacock blue', to represent the sky, while the bedroom and kitchen walls were painted 'lemon yellow'. A small service building was built at a ninety-degree angle, protruding from the front of the house, connected by a six-foot high privacy wall.

== Establishing a new paradigm ==
When the Revere Quality House was opened to visitors, more than 16,000 people toured the building in its first year. It was prominently-featured in Revere's advertising campaign nationwide, and received tremendous coverage in the press; Architectural Forum (October 1948), Architectural Review (November 1948), and House and Garden (August 1949). It was advertised regularly in the Saturday Evening Post. The American Institute of Architects recognized the Revere Quality House with its National Honor Award in 1949.

Twitchell and Rudolph's Revere Quality House created a new paradigm for tropical architecture. Its minimalism and the incorporation of environment into its design represented a new, more integrated, and simpler way of life for middle-class America. Millions of homes incorporating aspects of its design have been built across the southern United States.

== Preservation, addition, and recognition ==
Twitchell and his client would eventually marry and live in the house. He built another significant modern home for Finney's parents on the other side of the bayou; the Cocoon House. He lived in the Revere House until his death in 1978. The home fell into disrepair, and was slated for demolition, until 2005, when local conservators restored the original structure. Part of that preservation project included the construction of a new 'companion house' designed by architect Guy Peterson.

In 2005, the Revere Quality House was designated as a historic site by the City of Sarasota. In 2008, it was placed on the U.S. National Register of Historic Places.

Both the original Revere House and Revere Addition received the American Institute of Architects (Florida) Award of Excellence for Historic Restoration in 2011.

== Bibliography ==
- Howey, John (1995). The Sarasota School of Architecture: 1941 - 1966. Cambridge, MA: MIT Press. ISBN 978-0-26208-240-2.
- King, Joseph and Domin, Christopher (February 1, 2002). Paul Rudolph: The Florida Houses. Princeton Architectural Press. ISBN 978-1-56898-266-3.
- Rudolph, Paul (January 13, 2009). Writings on Architecture. Yale University Press. ISBN 978-0-30015-092-6.
- Rice, Patty Jo (1992). Interpreting Moods In Sticks, Stones, and Sunshine: The Life and Architecture of Ralph Twitchell. University of South Florida.
- Berger, Christopher (2010). Historic Preservation and the Sarasota School of Architecture: Three Case Studies (Masters Thesis). Gainesville, FL: University of Florida.
- Hochstim, Jan (2005-08-07). Florida Modern : Residential Architecture 1945-1970. Rizzoli New York. pp. 170–179. ISBN 978-0-84782-603-2.
- Weaving, Andrew (2006). Sarasota Modern. Rizzoli New York. ISBN 978-08478-2872-2.
- McClintock, Mike (January 1989). Alternative Housebuilding. Sterling Publishing. ISBN 978-0-80696-995-4.
