= Lamolithic house =

House built with reinforced concrete

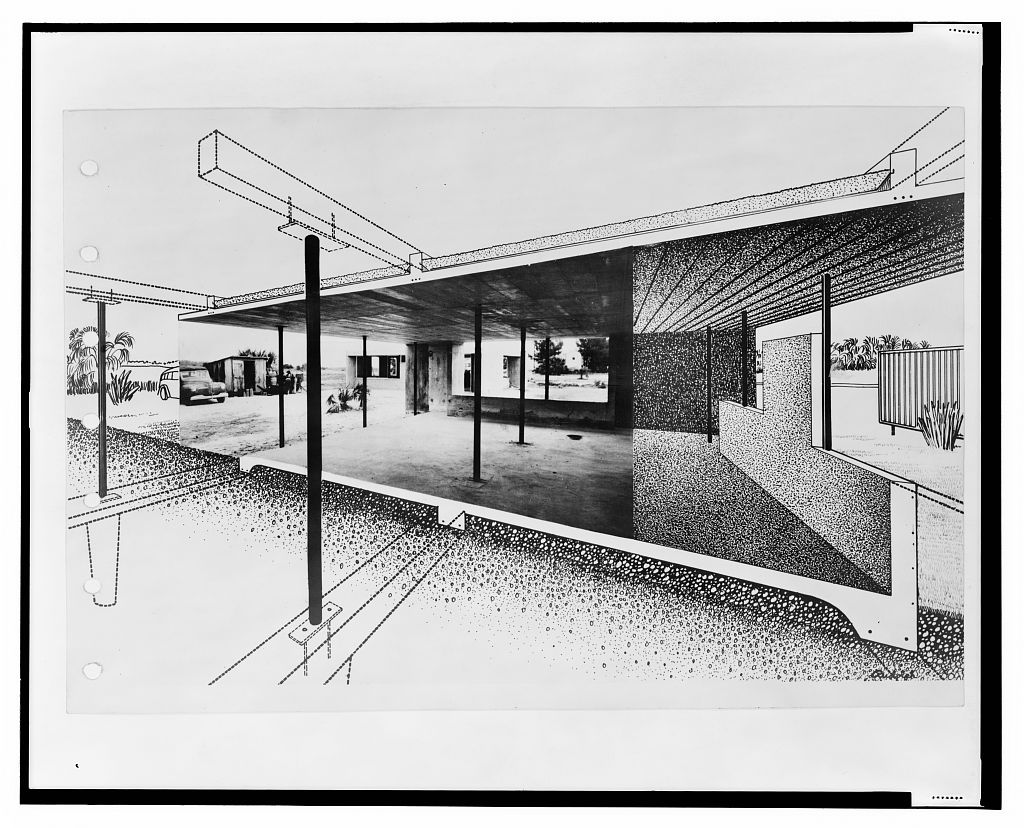
- Lamolithic House Construction View; Paul Rudolph, Architect.

- Location within Florida Location within the United States
- 27°16′09″N 82°33′18″W
- Type: Experimental design: Modern homes with cast-in-place lightweight reinforced concrete roof and wall structure
- Location: Siesta Key, Florida

History
- Built: 1939-1960

Site notes
- Architectural styles: Modern architecture Sarasota School of Architecture

Lamolithic house was the term given by Sarasota concrete businessman John Lambie to describe his unique method of building modern reinforced concrete residential structures. This building technique enabled the fabrication of thin ceiling and wall planes, thus enabling architects to draft efficient and lightweight designs. Several historic lamolithic houses were constructed by renowned architects Paul Rudolph and Ralph Twitchell (among others) on Siesta Key, Florida using this technique. These homes were among the earliest examples of reinforced concrete residential construction.

== New architectural concepts in Sarasota ==
Beginning in the 1940s, the modern movement known as the Sarasota School of Architecture was challenging pre-conceived notions of residential design. It proposed a radical new approach to the concept of the home; minimalist geometry, virtually no interior and few exterior walls, razor-thin flat roof. Extensive use of glass. Although this ‘open-plan’ idea had initially been realized by Mies van der Rohe with his Barcelona Pavilion and by Frank Lloyd Wright with his concrete-work at Florida Southern College and Fallingwater, architects Rudolph and Twitchell were developing conceptual plans for entire neighborhoods consisting of flat concrete roof and wall planes to be built as a speculative development on Siesta Key.

Concrete had the potential to be a viable, economic solution to new construction; resistant to moisture, termites and hurricanes. It permitted virtually unlimited freedom in spatial configuration. It represented the future of modern architectural design.

== The first lamolithic houses ==
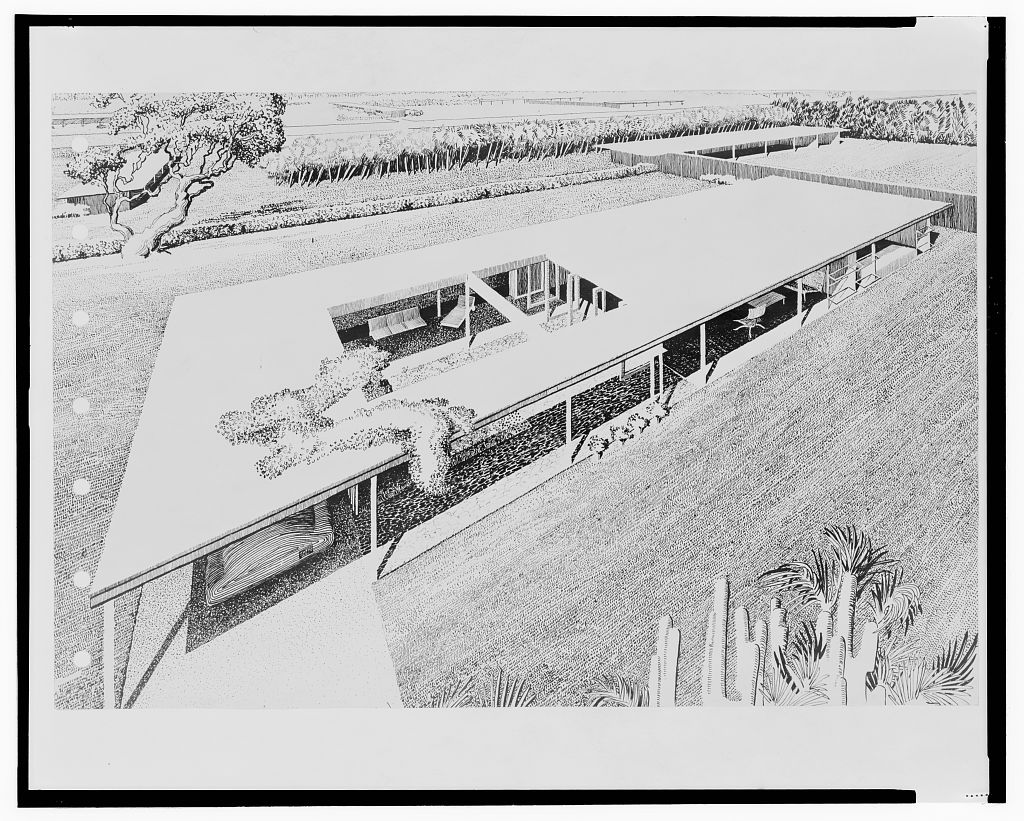
Revere Quality Institute House Paul Rudolph, Architect

Twitchell had known and worked with local concrete supplier, John E. Lambie for many years. Lambie, having worked with the progressive architects in the area, was somewhat experienced in developing new ways to utilize concrete in construction. In fact, Lambie had constructed homes with reinforced concrete for Twitchell before, dating as far back as 1939, for the Andrews House (Twitchell's secretary), as well as the Twitchell Residence.

The notion of forming a complete roof in place on a series of thin, steel perimeter poles was put to the test in a prototype building. The Revere Quality House was an experimental joint venture of Lambie's new Lamolithic Industries, Revere Copper Company, Architectural Forum magazine, and Twitchell / Rudolph Architects. Its mission was to promote the construction of quality, affordable houses that featured bold designs.

Utilizing reusable steel forms and mobile concrete mixing machines, Lambie successfully built the house entirely of concrete. To achieve the thin ceiling profile, narrow steel beams were incorporated to provide tensile strength. Lambie also pioneered an innovative passive environmental design into the roof, incorporating a thin crushed layer of shells to hold moisture. As the water evaporated, a cooling effect permeated into the home below.

When the Revere House was opened for tours in 1948, more than 16,000 people visited it in the first year. It was featured in Architectural Forum (October 1948), Architectural Review (November 1948), and House and Garden (August 1949). It was advertised regularly in the Saturday Evening Post.

The Revere Quality Institute House is listed on the U.S. National Register of Historic Places.

== Lamolithic houses of Siesta Key ==
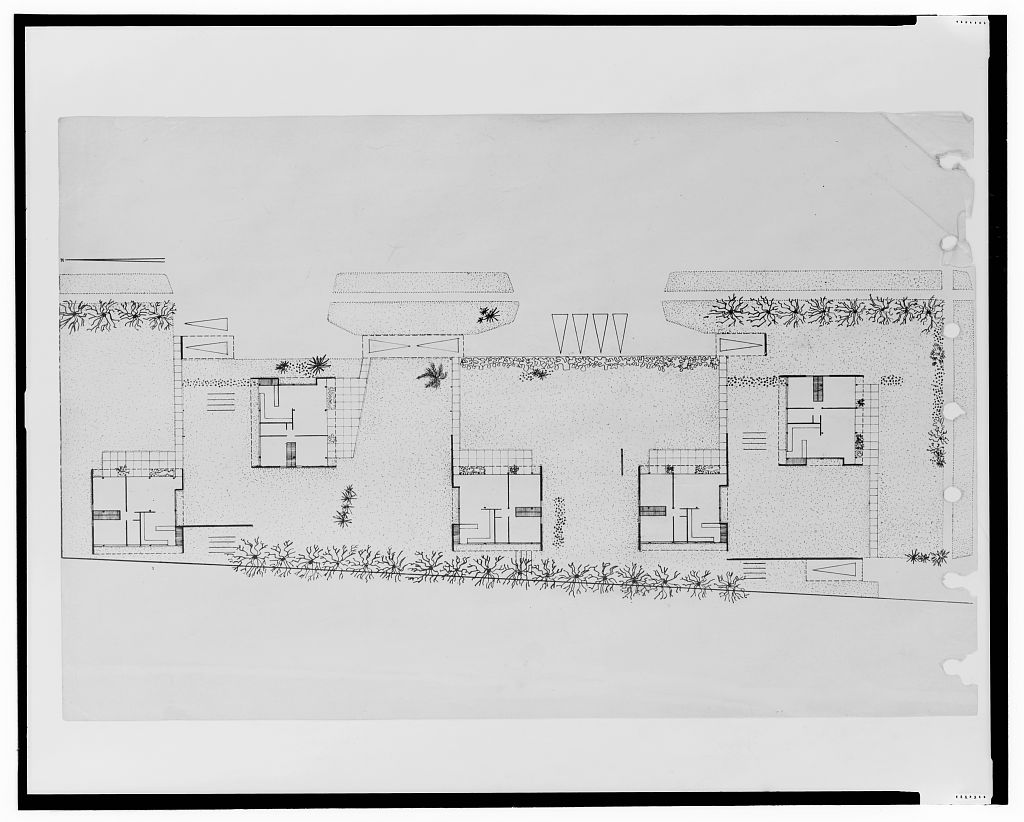
Lamolithic House Site Plan Paul Rudolph, Architect.

Simultaneously, Rudolph, Twitchell, and Lambie were already underway with the construction of a complex consisting of several lamolithic houses on the other side of Siesta Key, across the street from the famed Siesta Beach. This was Rudolph's first opportunity to experiment with a more urban design approach. The compact site encompassed four housing units with shared lamolithic privacy walls, defining inner and outer space, as well as private and public space. Despite its small footprint, Rudolph was able to create the illusion of expanded volume by staggering the open-plan structures on the site.

The original Rudolph design incorporated five units, but only four were completed.

Reinforced concrete construction proved to be very expensive to build. When architect and former employee of Twitchell, Jack West, was interviewed in 1994, he said that the original $14,000 budget for the Revere House doubled to $28,000 by the time the house was completed. From that point forward, large-scale poured-in-place structural concrete construction was no longer used for the vast majority of homes in Florida.

== Lamolithic house design and construction ==
Sources: U.S. Library of Congress and State Library and Archive of Florida

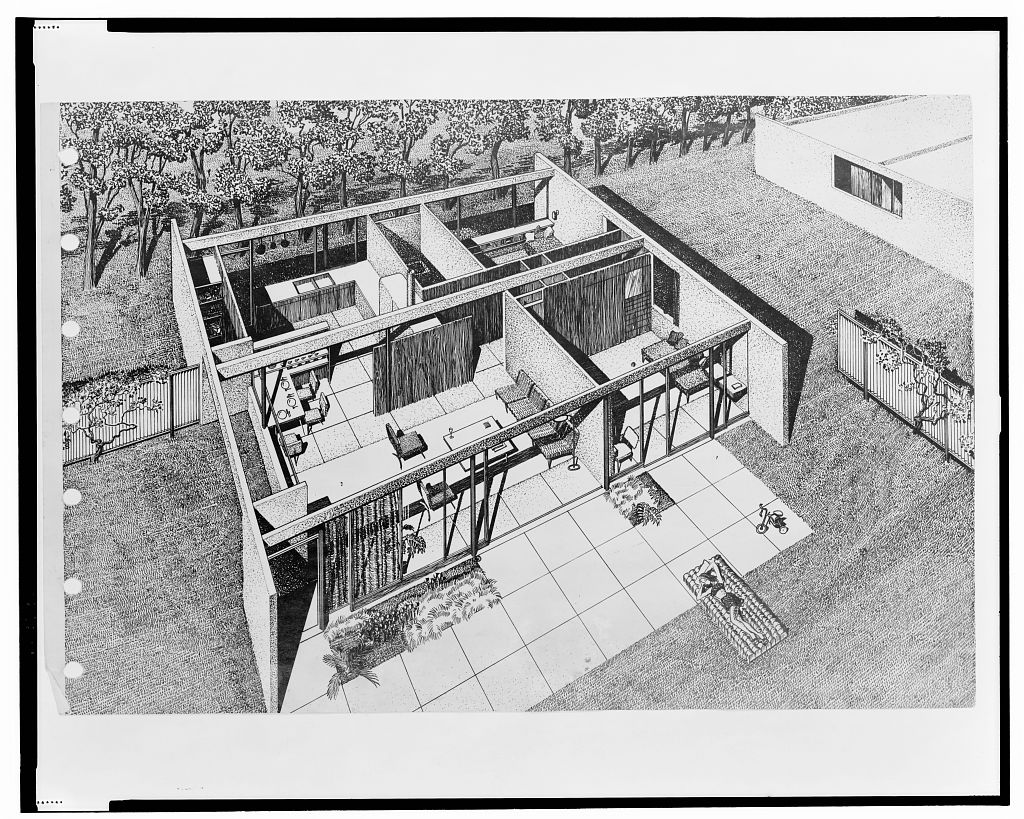
Lamolithic House Aerial Perspective (Paul Rudolph, Architect)

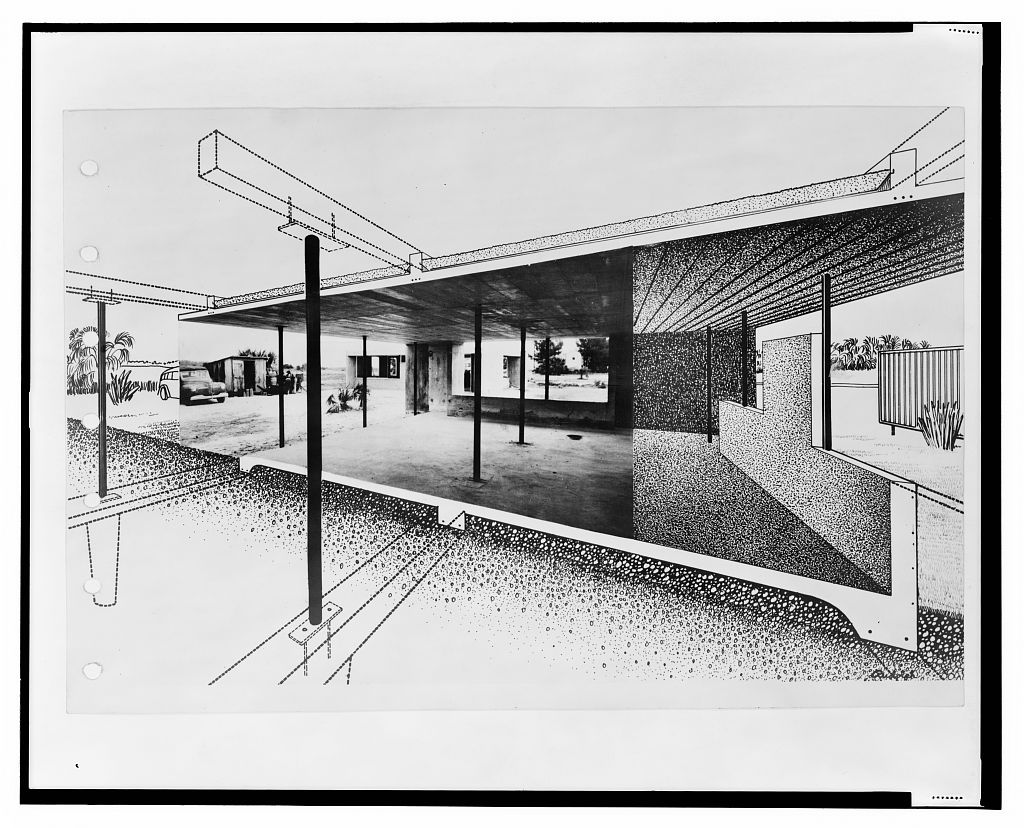
Lamolithic House Construction View (Paul Rudolph, Architect)

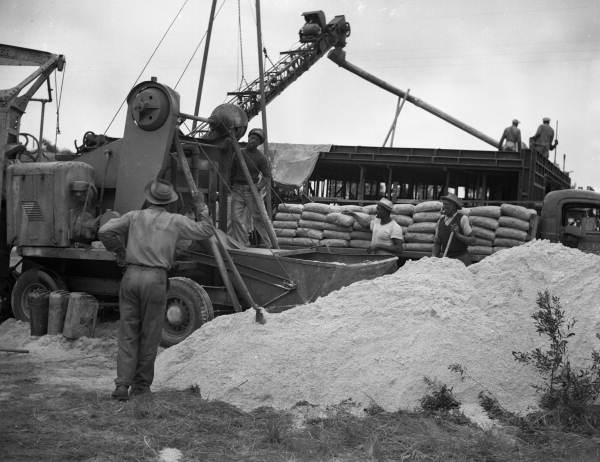
Lamolithic House Construction Site (1948)

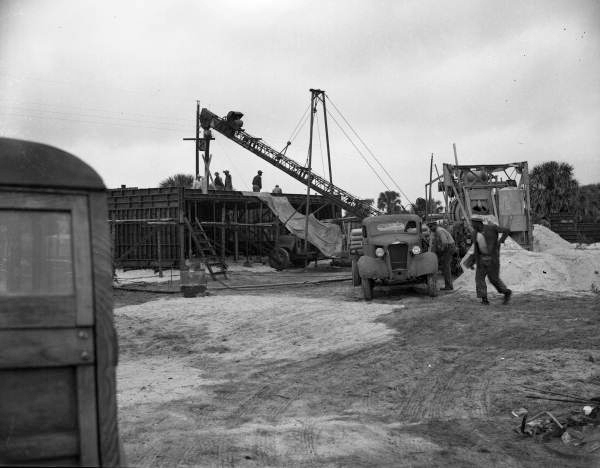
Lamolithic House On-Site Concrete Work (1948)

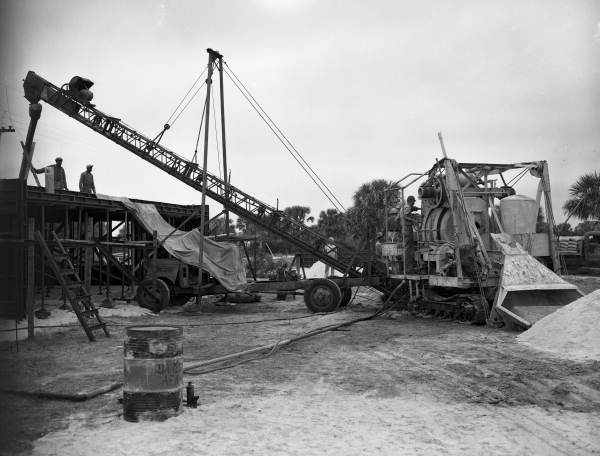
Lamolithic House Concrete Pumping (1948)

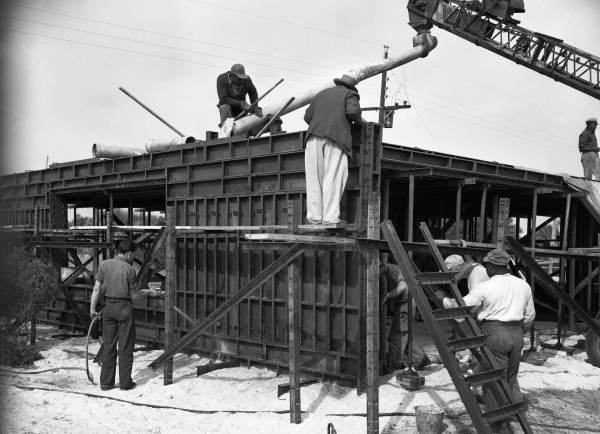
Lamolithic House Construction (1948)

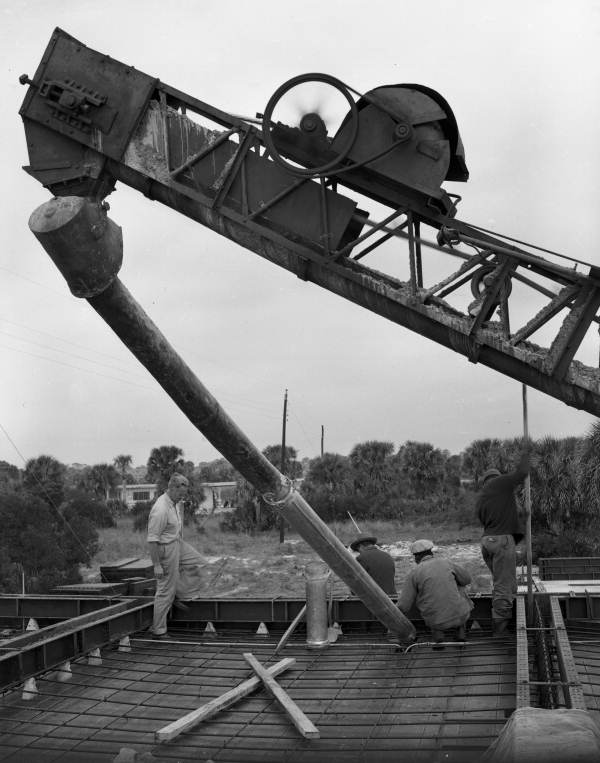
Lamolithic House Roof Construction (1948)

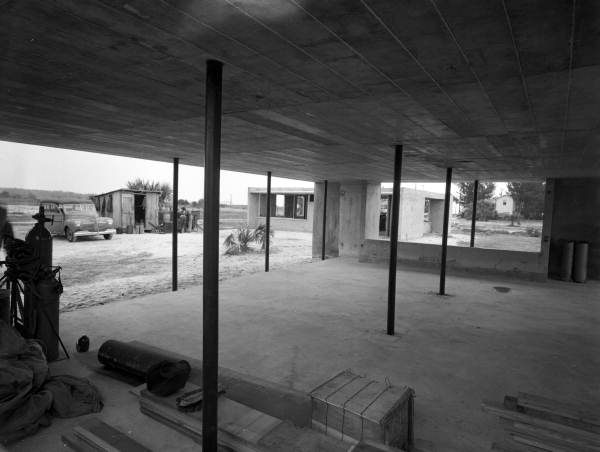
Lamolithic House Finished Concrete (1948)

== Bibliography ==
- Howey, John (1995). The Sarasota School of Architecture: 1941 - 1966. Cambridge, MA: MIT Press. p. 209. ISBN 978-0262082402.
- King, Joseph and Domin, Christopher (February 1, 2002). Paul Rudolph: The Florida Houses. Princeton Architectural Press. p. 248. ISBN 9781568982663.
- Rudolph, Paul (January 13, 2009). Writings on Architecture. Yale University Press. p. 164. ISBN 9780300150926.
- Rice, Patty Jo (1992). Interpreting Moods In Sticks, Stones, and Sunshine: The Life and Architecture of Ralph Twitchell. University of South Florida. p. 324.
- Berger, Christopher (2010). Historic Preservation and the Sarasota School of Architecture: Three Case Studies (Masters Thesis). Gainesville, FL: University of Florida.
- Hochstim, Jan (2005-08-07). Florida Modern : Residential Architecture 1945-1970. Rizzoli New York. pp. 170–179. ISBN 978-0847826032.
- Weaving, Andrew (2006). Sarasota Modern. Rizzoli New York. ISBN 9780847828722.
- McClintock, Mike (January 1989). Alternative Housebuilding. Sterling Publishing. p. 384. ISBN 978-0806969954.
