= Ralph Twitchell =

American architect (1890–1978)

Ralph Spencer Twitchell
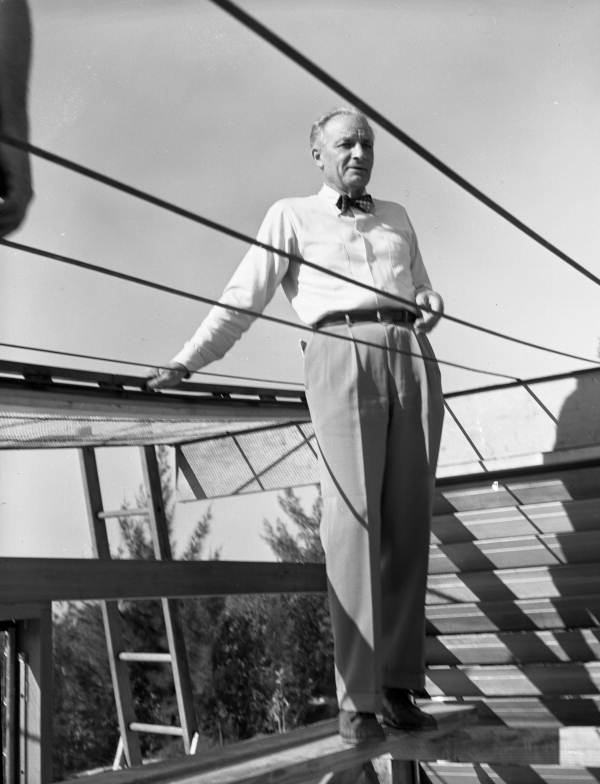
- Ralph Twitchell at the construction of the Healy Guest House (aka "Cocoon House"), 1950
- Born: July 27, 1890; Mansfield, Ohio
- Died: January 30, 1978 (aged 87); Sarasota, Florida
- Education: Rollins College; McGill University; Columbia University; B.A. Design (Architecture); M.A. Architecture
- Occupation: Architect
- Children: Sylva Hutchins, Tollyn Twitchell, Terry Twitchell, Debbie, Aaron Twitchell
- Practice: Associated Builders; Twitchell and Rudolph
- Buildings: Cà d'Zan; Twitchell House; Hodge House; Healy Guest House; Revere Quality House; Lamolithic Houses; Sarasota County Courthouse; Miller House and Guest Cottage; MacKinlay Kantor Residence; Leavengood Residence

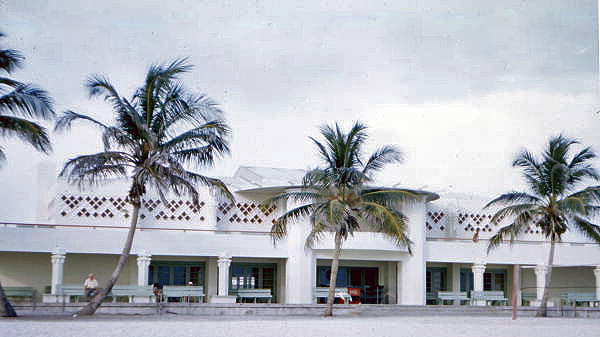
Lido Beach Casino (Ralph Twitchell, Architect) 1939

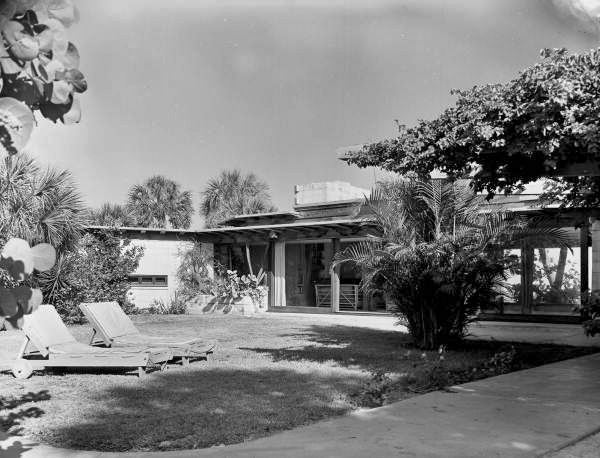
Twitchell House (Ralph Twitchell and Paul Rudolph, Architects) 1941

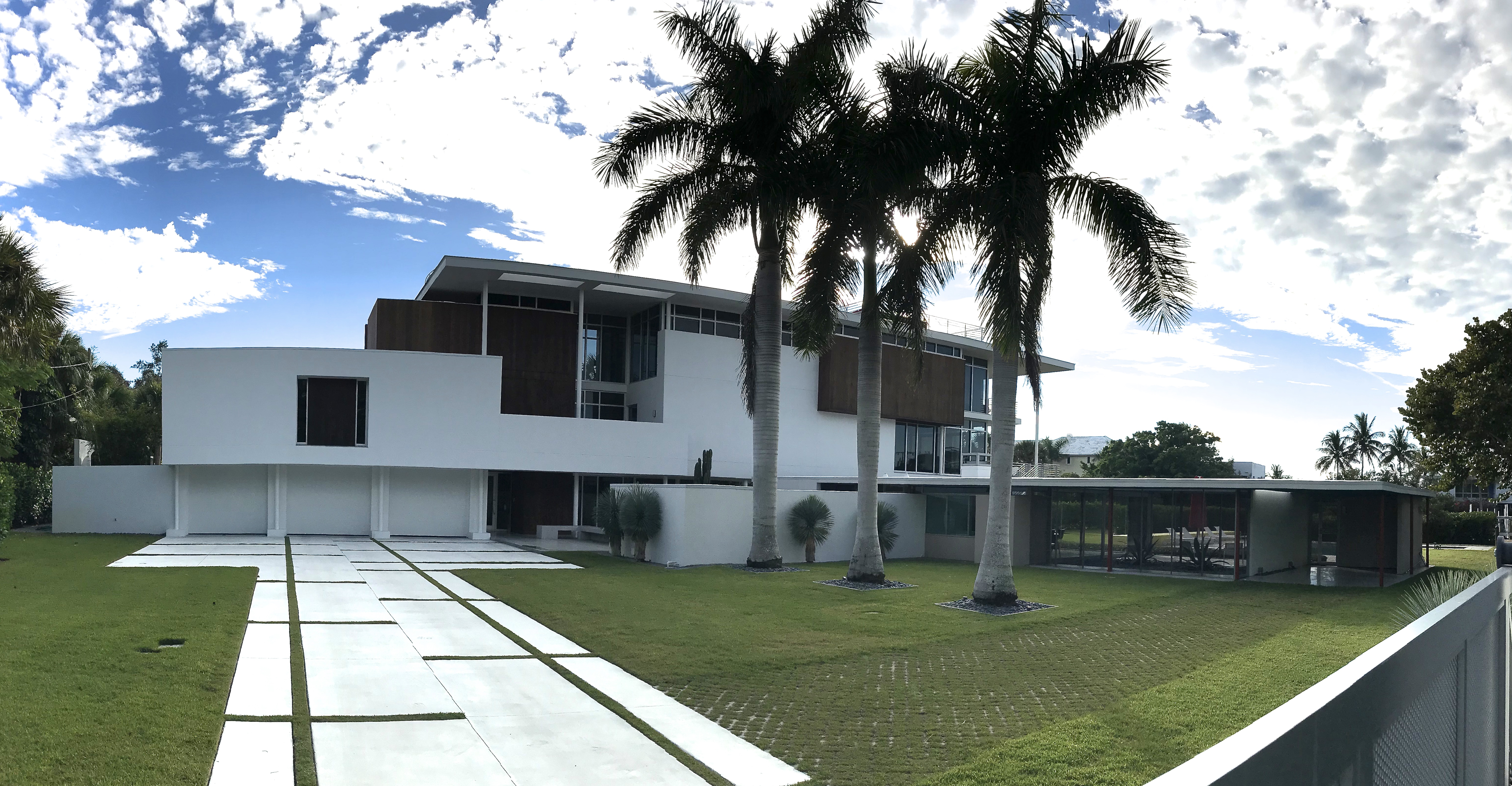
Revere Quality House (1948) - Ralph Twitchell and Paul Rudolph Companion House (2007) - Guy Peterson)

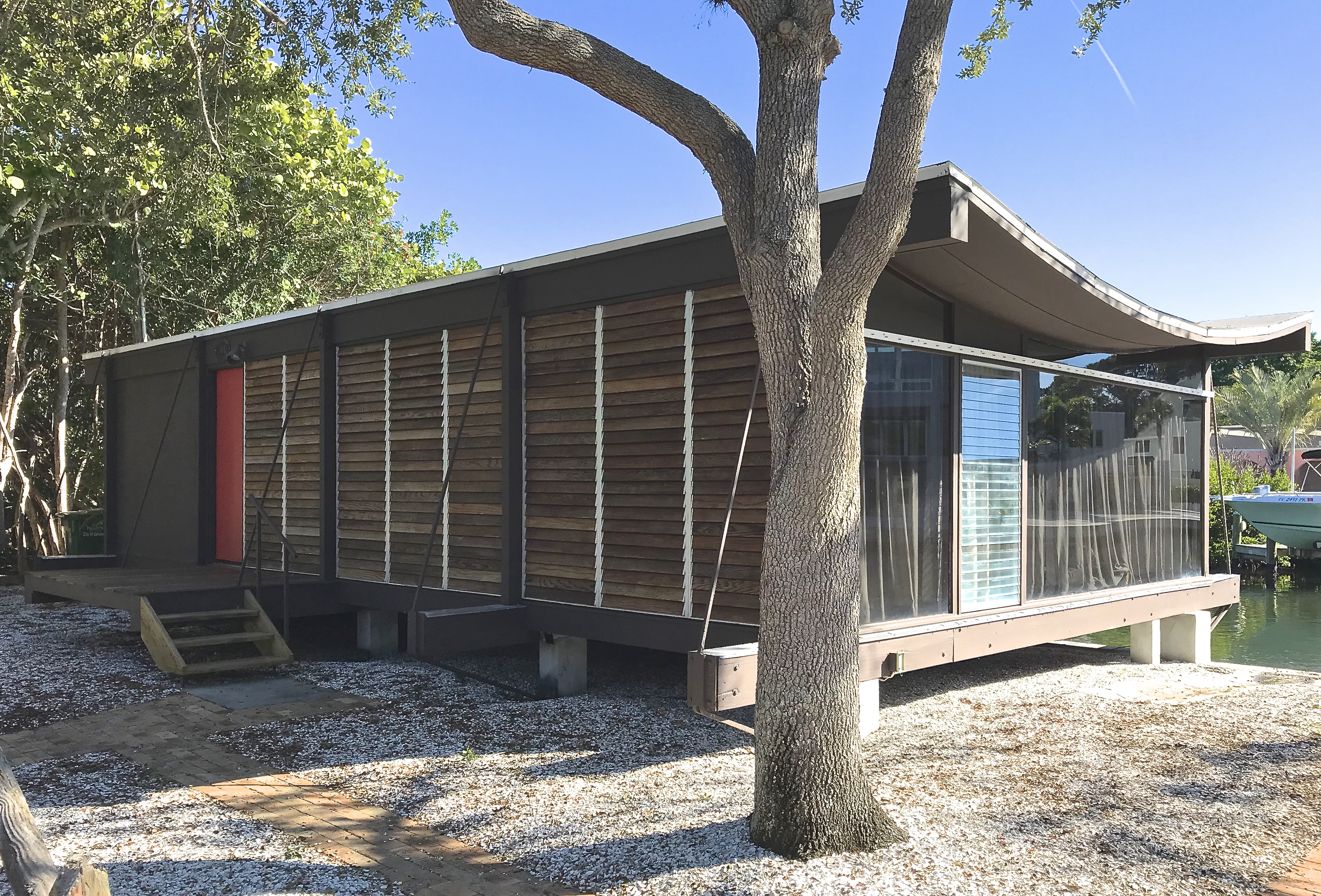
Cocoon House (Ralph Twitchell and Paul Rudolph, Architects) 1950

Ralph Spencer Twitchell (July 27, 1890 – January 30, 1978) was one of the founding members of the Sarasota School of Architecture. He is considered the father of the group of modernist architecture practitioners, including Paul Rudolph, Jack West, and other modernist architects active in the Sarasota area in the 1950s and 1960s like Ralph and William Zimmerman, Gene Leedy, Mark Hampton, Edward “Tim” Seibert, Victor Lundy, William Rupp, Bert Brosmith, Frank Folsom Smith, James Holiday, Joseph Farrell, and Carl Abbott. He bridged the more traditional architecture of his early work in Florida during the 1920s with his modernist designs that began in the 1940s.

== Education and early career ==
Twitchell was born to Albert John and Ella Callista (Downs) Twitchell in Mansfield, Ohio. After the untimely death of his father in 1906, his mother moved the family to Winter Park, Florida. Twitchell enrolled in Rollins College, but transferred to McGill University, Montreal, in 1910 to study architecture. In 1912, Twitchell transferred schools again, to Columbia University. After his 1917-19 World War I military service, Twitchell graduated from Columbia with a Bachelor of Arts degree in architecture in 1920 and a Masters in Architecture in 1921.

Twitchell first came to Sarasota in 1925 as the representative of New York architect Dwight James Baum to manage the final stages of the construction of John Ringling's Cà d'Zan, a Venetian-style mansion on the Sarasota Bay. Florida was in the midst of a land boom. Twitchell purchased thirteen lots in the Ravellan Gardens bayside neighborhood of Sarasota and designed Mediterranean architecture homes on these lots. Lauded in the press, the promise of the project evaporated when the Florida real estate bubble collapsed in 1926 (some surviving homes have been included on the National Register of Historic Places). Twitchell retreated to the Northeast and more favorable economic climate.

== Sarasota School of Architecture ==
In 1936, Twitchell moved permanently to Sarasota to open his own architectural and construction company, Associated Builders. Among his earliest commissions were a Siesta Key residence for author MacKinlay Kantor and the Lido Beach Casino. In the following years, Twitchell (influenced by the innovative architecture of Frank Lloyd Wright and LeCorbusier) began experimenting with reinforced concrete and glass structures, facilitating a more modernist approach.

In 1938, the American Institute of Architects revoked Twitchell's membership, primarily due to Twitchell's ownership of a construction company. At that time, the profession took a dim view of architects engaged in construction. Twitchell believed, however, that the Florida landscape required a unique understanding of building site planning that could be only be accomplished by merging design and construction. The revocation had no bearing on his ability to work. In 1976, two years before his death, the AIA reversed its decision and recognized Twitchell for his career achievements by naming him "Architect Emeritus."

In the summer of 1941, Twitchell hired Paul Rudolph, 28 years his younger, after Rudolph completed his studies at the Alabama Polytechnic Institute (today, Auburn University) and before he began attending Harvard University's Graduate School of Design. Rudolph, like Twitchell, was fixated on vanguard architecture, and the two collaborated on a number of projects (including Twitchell's own residence) in the months prior to Rudolph's departure for graduate studies.

Rudolph returned to Twitchell's Siesta Key office in 1946 and partnered with him until 1951. Rudolph focused on the idea of the structure while Twitchell prioritized construction details. Typically, each project required three or four iterations, expressed sequentially, until the initial creative concept became rooted to the specifics of its site. During this time, Twitchell and Rudolph designed many ground-breaking private residences that are the foundation of the Sarasota School of Architecture, including the Miller House and Guest Cottage (1947), the Revere Quality House (1948), the Lamolithic Houses (1948), the Healy Guest House (Cocoon House 1950), and the Leavengood Residence in St. Petersburg, Florida (1951). The Revere Quality House, with rooms that opened out onto terraces and landscaped areas, was the first poured concrete house on Siesta Key. Such open design was reflective of the Sarasota School of Architecture philosophy: clarity of construction, maximum economy of means, clear geometry, and honesty in details.

Twitchell and Rudolph parted ways in 1951. Between 1953 and 1954, Twitchell partnered with another "Sarasota School" architect, Jack West, and between 1959 and 1965 with his son, Tollyn Jules Twitchell. Ralph Twitchell died in Sarasota, Florida, on January 30, 1978.

== Personal life ==
Twitchell married three times and had five children: Sylva, Tollyn and Terry from his first marriage, and Aaron and Debbie from his second marriage.

== Buildings ==
- The Hodge House, Sarasota, Florida, 1926
- MacKinlay Kantor Residence, Siesta Key, Sarasota, Florida, 1936
- Showboat House, Lake Louise, Florida, 1937
- Lido Beach Casino, Siesta Key, Sarasota, Florida, 1937-1940 (with Arthur Saxe, demolished in 1969)
- Riviera Apartments, Golden Gate Point, Sarasota, Florida, 1941 (demolished)
- Twitchell Residence at Big Pass, Siesta Key, Sarasota, Florida, 1941 (with Paul Rudolph) (dismantled - in storage)
- Miller Guest House, Casey Key, Sarasota, Florida, 1947 (with Paul Rudolph) (demolished)
- Revere Quality House, Sarasota, Florida, 1948 (with Paul Rudolph)
- Lamolithic Houses, Siesta Key, Sarasota, Florida, 1948 (with Paul Rudolph)
- Deeds Residence, Siesta Key, Florida, 1949 (with Paul Rudolph)
- Burnette Residence, Sarasota, Florida, 1950 (with Paul Rudolph) (demolished)
- Healy Guest House - "The Cocoon House" - Siesta Key, Sarasota, Florida, 1950 (with Paul Rudolph)
- Leavengood Residence, St. Petersburg, Florida, 1951 (with Paul Rudolph) (demolished)
- Hudson Beach House, Venice, Florida, 1953
- Knotts Residence, Yankeetown, Florida, 1953 (with Jack West)
- Andrews Residence #3, Sarasota, Florida, 1959
- Ogden Lane Spec Houses, Siesta Key, Sarasota, Florida, 1961
- Stuart Rae Residence, Siesta Key, Sarasota, Florida, 1962
- Merton Wilcox Residence, 1965, Twitchell's last house designed on Siesta Key

== Bibliography ==
- Hitchcock, Henry-Russell and Drexler, Arthur (1952). Built in USA; post-war architecture (PDF). New York, NY: Museum of Modern Art. pp. 111–113. ISBN 978-1258490690.
- Hochstim, Jan (2005). Florida Modern : Residential Architecture 1945-1970. Rizzoli New York. pp. 144–153. ISBN 978-0847826032.
- Howey, John (1995). The Sarasota School of Architecture: 1941 - 1966. Cambridge, MA: MIT Press. p. 209. ISBN 978-0262082402.
- King, Joseph and Domin, Christopher (February 1, 2002). Paul Rudolph: The Florida Houses. Princeton Architectural Press. p. 248. ISBN 9781568982663.
- Peter, John (1958). Masters of Modern Architecture. Bonanza Books. p. 230. ISBN 9781499386165.
- Weaving, Andrew (2005). The Home Modernized. London Jacqui Small LLP.
- Weaving, Andrew (2006). Sarasota Modern. Rizzoli New York. ISBN 9780847828722.
