= William Rupp =

American architect

William J. Rupp
- Born: August 25, 1927; Philadelphia, Pennsylvania
- Died: February 7, 2002 (aged 74); Montague, Massachusetts
- Education: University of Florida (Phi Kappa Phi Honors)
- Occupation: Architect
- Practice: Paul Rudolph Architect; Rupp and Farrell Architects; Rupp Architects
- Buildings: Scott Commercial Building; Davis House; Uhr Studio; Caladesi National Bank Denedin; The Pavilion House; Brentwood Elementary School; Rupp House

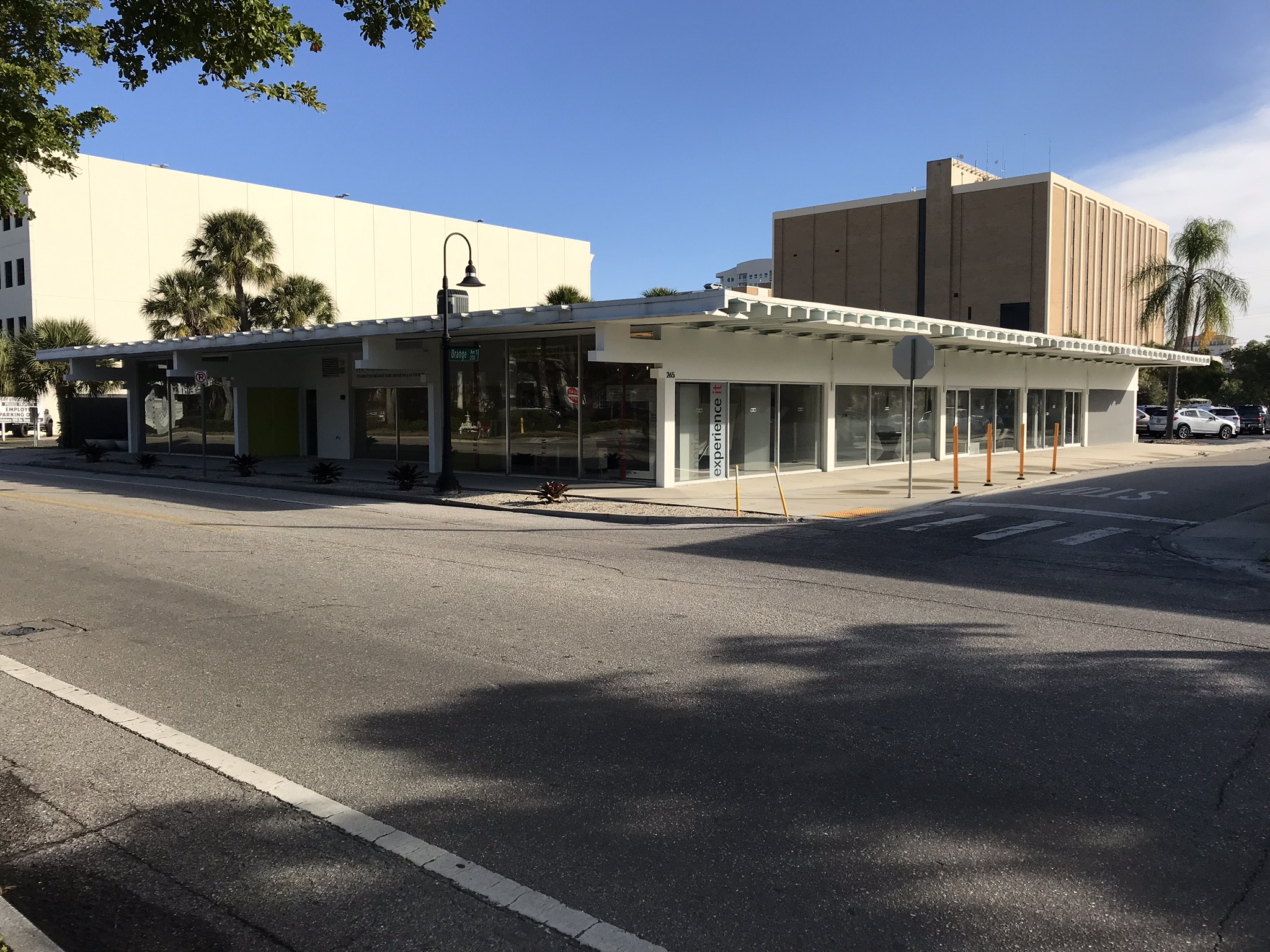
Scott Building (McCulloch Pavilion - Center For Architecture Sarasota)

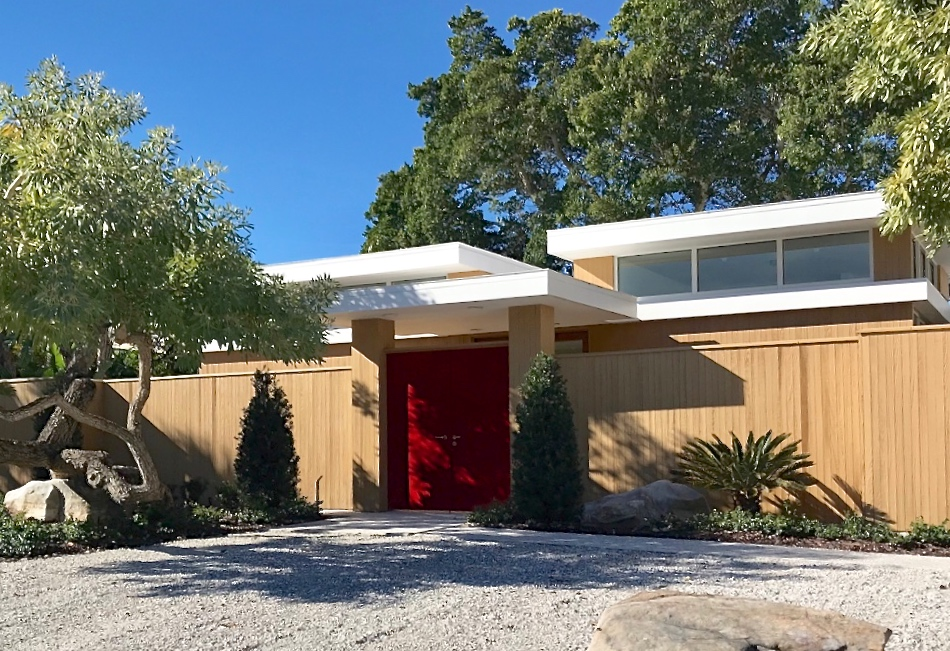
Kirsch House (Lido Shores, Sarasota, Florida)

William J. Rupp (August 25, 1927 – February 7, 2002) was one of the modernist American architects considered part the Sarasota School of Architecture.

== Early life and education ==
Rupp was born on August 25, 1927, in Philadelphia, Pennsylvania, to Frank J. and Sarah Viola Rupp. At eighteen, Rupp was inducted into the U.S. Army as an infantryman. After an extended period of military service, during which time he moved to Florida, he remained in the military reserves until he was honorably discharged in 1955. Post active service, Rupp attended the University of Florida, graduating in 1953 with Phi Kappa Phi honors in design (architecture). In 1957, he married Gwendolyn Marie O'Rourke.

We students at the University of Florida in the early 50s began to hear of an architect named Twitchell doing some remarkable work. Some students went down and reported that, in fact, the work was being done by a young Harvard man named Rudolph. Soon the publications were being sought and studied. A field trip was organized to see Frank Lloyd Wright's campus at Lakeland and over to Sarasota for the work of Twitchell and Rudolph. Both principals were out of town but an accommodating young man, Mark Hampton, their sole employee, took us on the tour. It is no understatement to say that we felt that we had found "The Answer".

— William Rupp

== Career in Sarasota ==
Upon graduation, Rupp worked with founding Sarasota School of Architecture member Paul Rudolph, eventually managing Rudolph's Sarasota office. In 1955, Rudolph left Florida for New York City, and Rupp opened a private architectural practice at 224 South Orange Avenue, downtown Sarasota. During the next several years, Rupp worked closely with his architectural peers in Sarasota; Ralph Twitchell, Jack West, Gene Leedy, Tim Seibert, Victor Lundy, and Bert Brosmith. In 1959, he formed Associated Architects with friend and fellow architect Joseph Farrell. Although this partnership lasted two years, they produced several significant works, including Uhr Residence-Studio, Rupp Home, Kirsch House, Caladesi National Bank in Dunedin, the Pavilion House, and the dining pavilion at the Ringling Museum of Art.

In 1959, Clarence Scott commissioned Rupp and Farrell to design a commercial building that would serve as a showroom for the Barkus Furniture Company. Rupp and Farrell designed the building the following year. The building displays the characteristics of the Sarasota School of Architecture in planning and design, which was a prominent design in Central Florida. The building features a stucco exterior, large picture windows, and large extending concrete rafter beams.

The Scott Commercial Building was widely recognized as a ground-breaking design utilizing prefabricated concrete structural members. Acknowledging this important architectural achievement, the building was restored, renamed McCulloch Pavilion, and added to the U.S. National Register of Historic Places in 2017.

In 1962, Rupp was featured in a special edition of Life Magazine, in an article entitled, The Takeover Generation – The 100 Most Outstanding Young Men and Women in the United States.

In 1965, Rupp moved his architectural practice to Naples, Florida, where he worked on several projects; including three apartment complexes, an animal clinic, a restaurant, and his own residence.

== Principal projects in Sarasota ==
- Davis Residence, Sarasota (with Paul Rudolph, 1953)
- Tastee Freez, Sarasota (with Paul Rudolph, 1954)
- Beach Pavilion, Manasota Key (1956)
- Wilson Residence, Sarasota (1956)
- Kirsch House, Sarasota (1957)
- Willis Residence, Sarasota (1957)
- Hatt Residence, Sarasota (1958)
- Brentwood Elementary School (associated with Gene Leedy) (1959)
- Kiekhaefer/Mercury Marine Florida Distribution Center, Sarasota-Bradenton Airport (1959)
- Scott Building, Sarasota (with Joe Farrell, associate) (1960)
- Rupp Residence, 42nd St., Sarasota (1960)
- Doyle Residence, 42nd St., Sarasota. (1960) Renovated 2007 Seibert Architects.
- Dining Pavilion: Ringling Museum of Art, Sarasota (1961)
- Uhr Studio, Sarasota (1961)
- Bowling Green Subdivision and Model Houses, Fort Myers (1962)
- Wilcox Residence, Sarasota (1962)
- Everglades City Villas; Development and Model houses (1963)
- Fast Food Restaurant, Sarasota (1963)
- Markowitz Residence, Sarasota (1964)

== Moving north ==
In 1968, Rupp joined Morris Ketchum Jr. & Associates in New York as an associate architect. During that time, he developed several renovations and exhibits for The Bronx Zoo and New York Aquarium.

In 1972, he moved to Amherst, Massachusetts, working with Callister, Payne & Bischoff, Architects and Community Planners. He went into private practice in the mid-1970s. Rupp became a lecturer on architecture at the University of Massachusetts, Amherst, eventually obtaining a full-time teaching appointment. By 1978, he was Director of the Architectural Studies Program and the Interior Design Program.

In 1989, Rupp co-authored and published the architectural textbook, Construction Materials for Interior Design: Principles of Structure and Properties of Materials.

He retired in 1995 and died in 2002 in Montague, Massachusetts.

== Awards and citations ==
- 1960 Architectural Record, Award for Excellence, House Design
- 1961 Progressive Architecture Design Award, for Caladesi National Bank, Dunedin, FL
- 1962 Progressive Architecture Design Award, for the Uhr Studio, Sarasota FL
- 1963 "Gli Giovani Architetti Americani" Italian Exhibition
- 1964 American Institute of Architects (New York Chapter) for the Uhr Studio

== Publications ==
- 1958 Willis Residence, Arts and Architecture
- 1959 Willis Residence, House and Home (February)
- 1959 Brentwood Elementary School, Architectural Record (February), Architectural Forum (February), Florida Architect (March)
- 1960 Hatt Residence, Architectural Record (May)
- 1961 Caladesi National Bank, Progressive Architecture (January), Florida Architect, (August)
- 1961 Ringling Museum Pavilion, Architectural Forum (August)
- 1962 Uhr Studio, Progressive Architecture (September), L'Architecture d'Aujour d'Hui (October)
- 1962 Wilcox Residence, Architectural Design Preview USA, Reinhold Publishing Co.
- 1963 Project House Sarasota, American Home (June)
- 1964 Bowling Green Subdivision, House and Home (September)
- 1965 Uhr Studio, Casabella (September)
- 1965 Everglades City Villas, Family Circle (August)
- 1966 Uhr Studio, American Home (May)
- 1976 Scott Building, Florida Architect (October)
- 1983 Florida Architect (winter) "Sarasota School of Architects" pp. 12–15 color
- 2010 Hauser Magazine, "Florida's Gentle Modernism" by Andres Lepik; Undine Prohl.

== Bibliography ==
The following architectural resource books feature the work of architect William Rupp:

- Rupp, William, and Friedmann, Arnold (January 1, 1989). Construction Materials for Interior Design. Watson-Guptill. ISBN 9780823009305.
- Weaving, Andrew (2006). Sarasota Modern. Rizzoli New York. pp. 56–65. ISBN 9780847828722.
- Hochstim, Jan (2004). Florida Modern : Residential Architecture 1945-1970. Rizzoli New York. pp. 170-179. ISBN 0847826031.
- Howey, John (1995). The Sarasota School of Architecture: 1941 - 1966. Cambridge, MA: MIT Press. p. 209. ISBN 0262082403.
- Weaving, Andrew (2005). The Home Modernized. London Jacqui Small LLP.
- King, Joseph and Domin, Christopher (February 1, 2002). Paul Rudolph: The Florida Houses. Princeton Architectural Press. p. 248. ISBN 9781568982663.
