= Guy Peterson =

American architect

- Born: Guy Wesley Peterson; December 26, 1953 (age 72); Cheyenne, Wyoming
- Education: University of Florida; (B.Des, M.Arch)
- Occupation: Architect

Guy Wesley Peterson (born December 26, 1953) is an American architect based in Sarasota, Florida. He has designed more than 200 structures in southwest Florida, including private and public works. Peterson was an adjunct professor of architecture at the University of Florida, College of Design, Construction and Planning, and the author of Naked: The Architecture of Guy Peterson.

Peterson is a Fellow of the American Institute of Architects (FAIA) and the AIA Florida Gold Medal recipient for his architectural contributions.

== Personal life, career, and influences ==
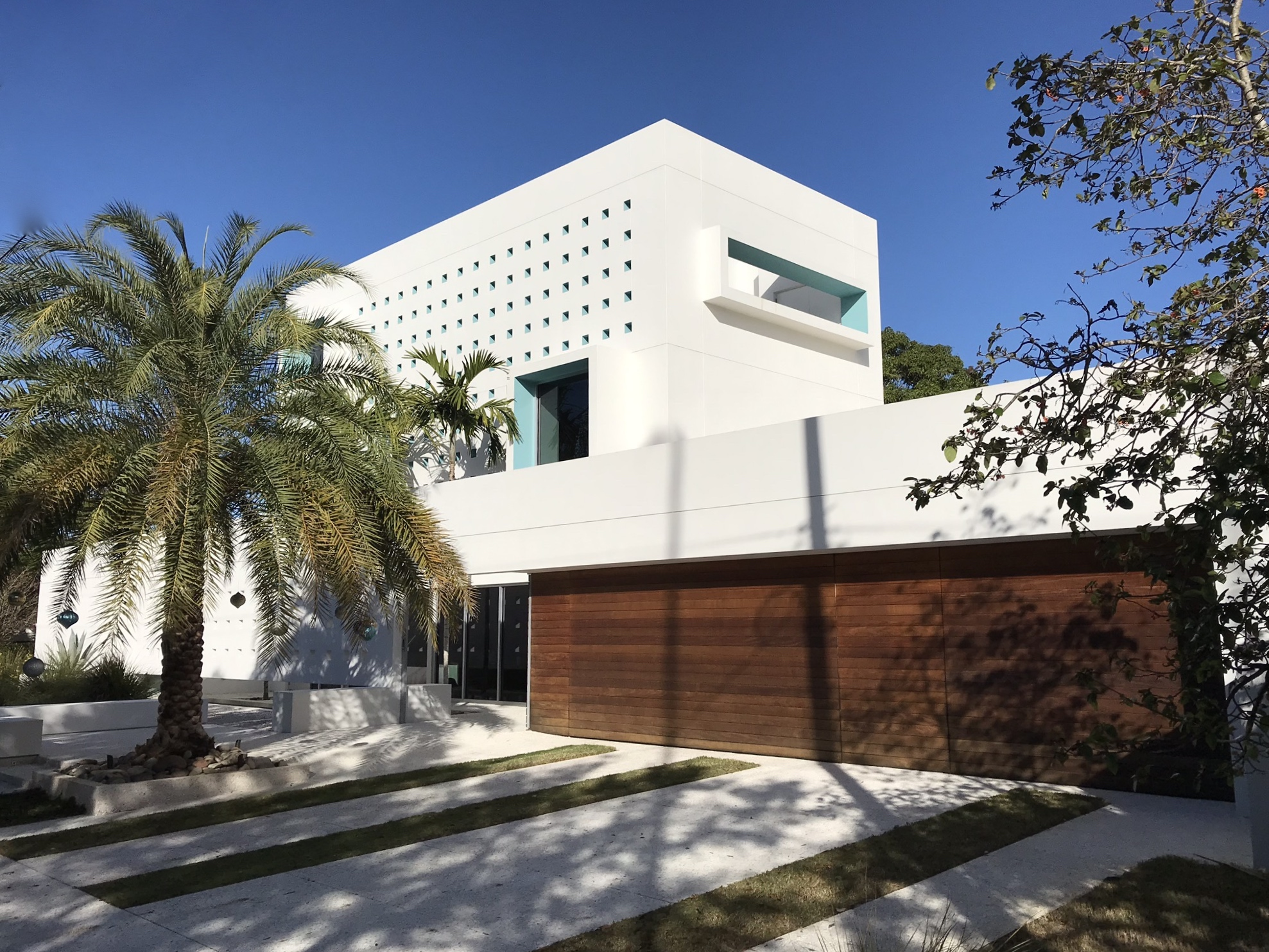
Spencer House

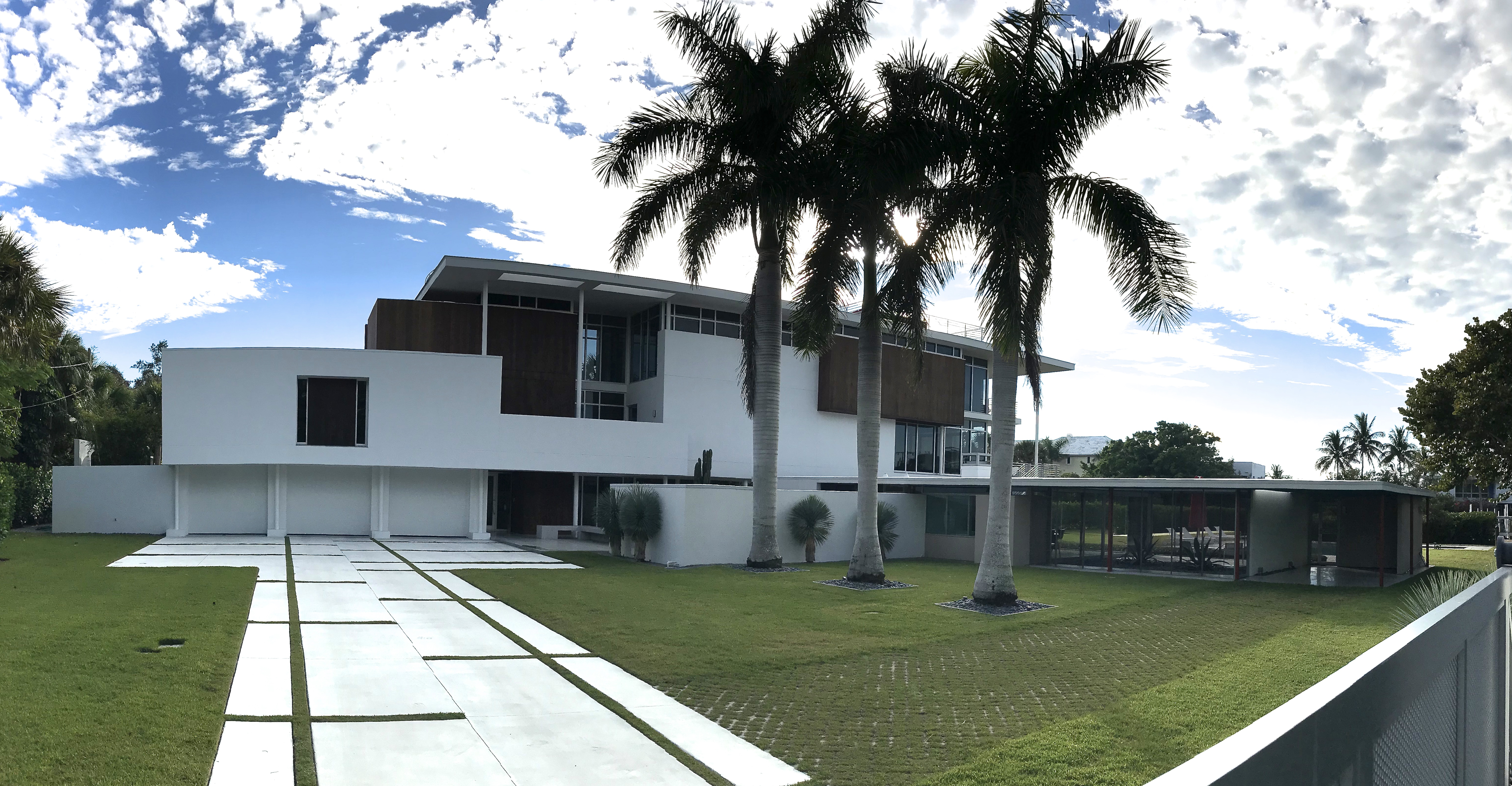
Revere Quality House (Original house - Paul Rudolph and Ralph Twitchell. Companion House - Guy Peterson)

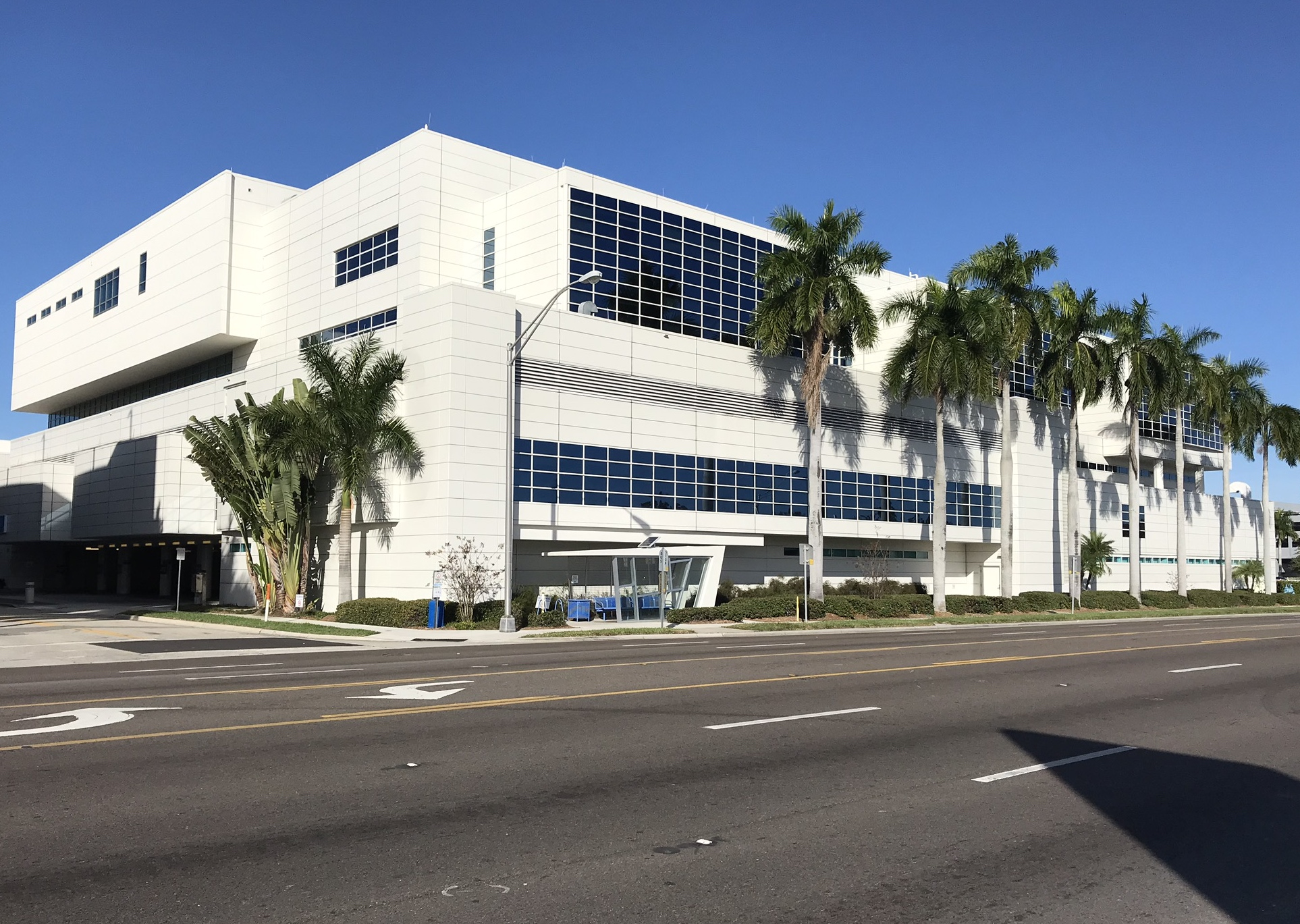
Sarasota Memorial Hospital Critical Care Center

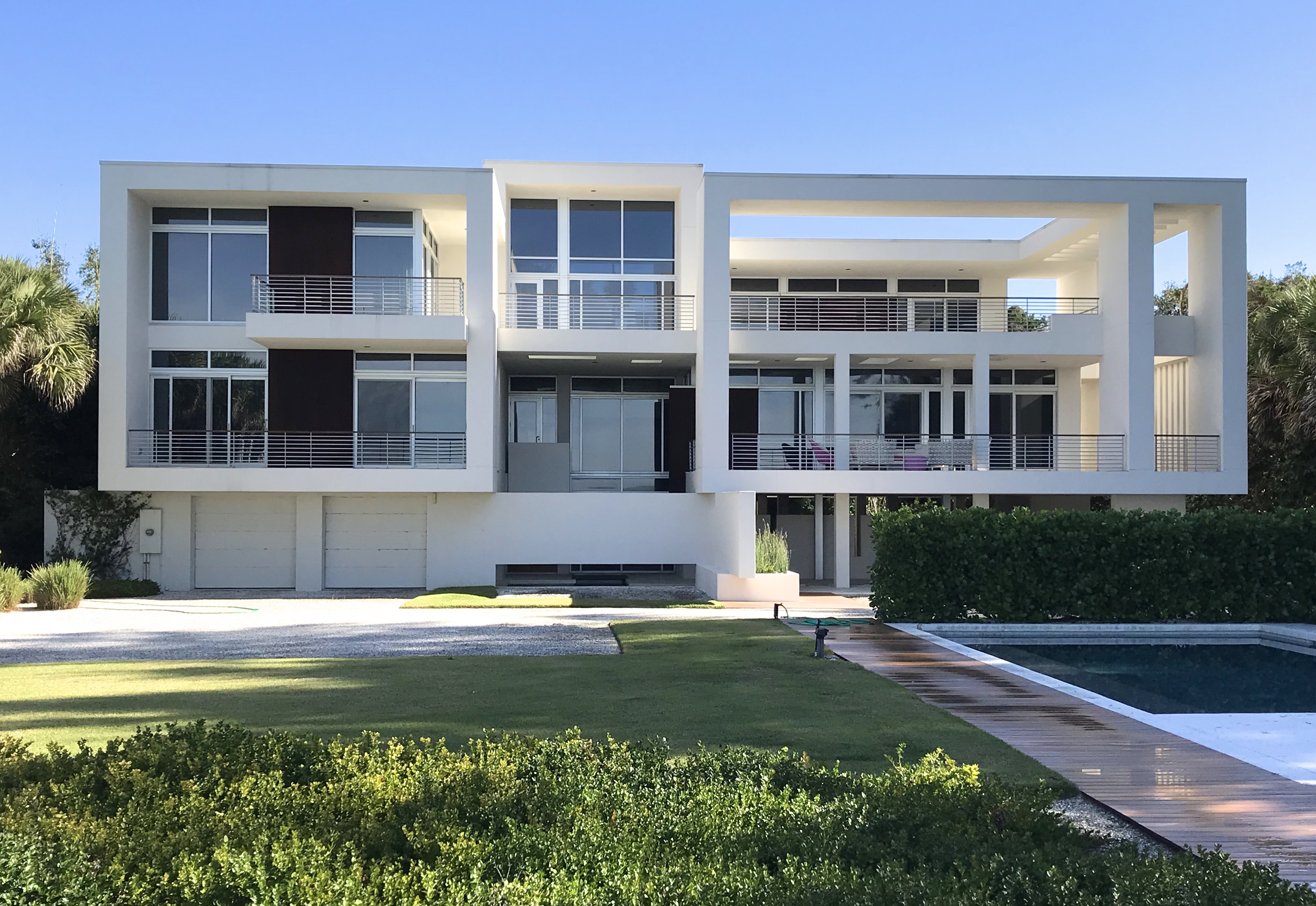
Durbin House

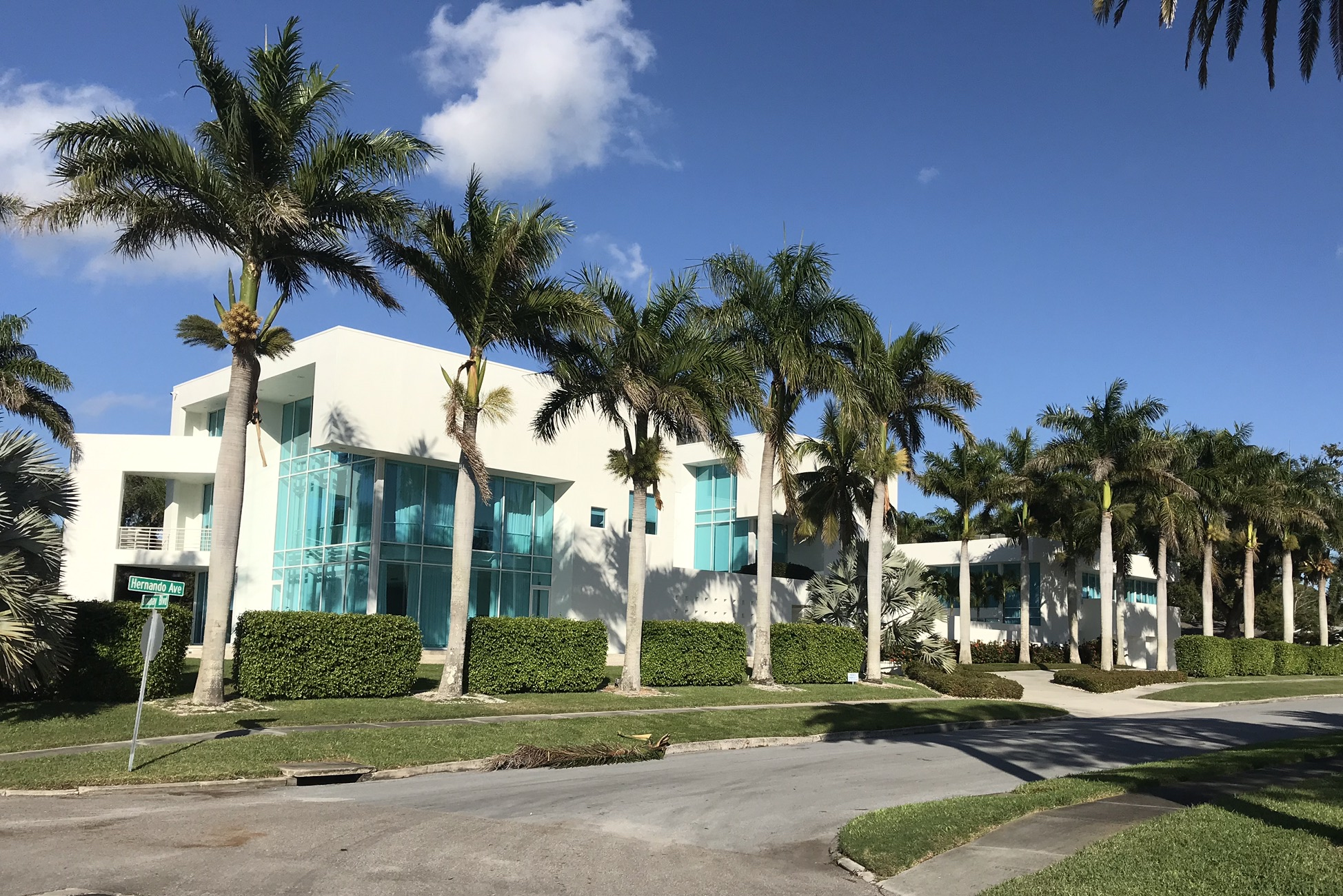
Theisen House

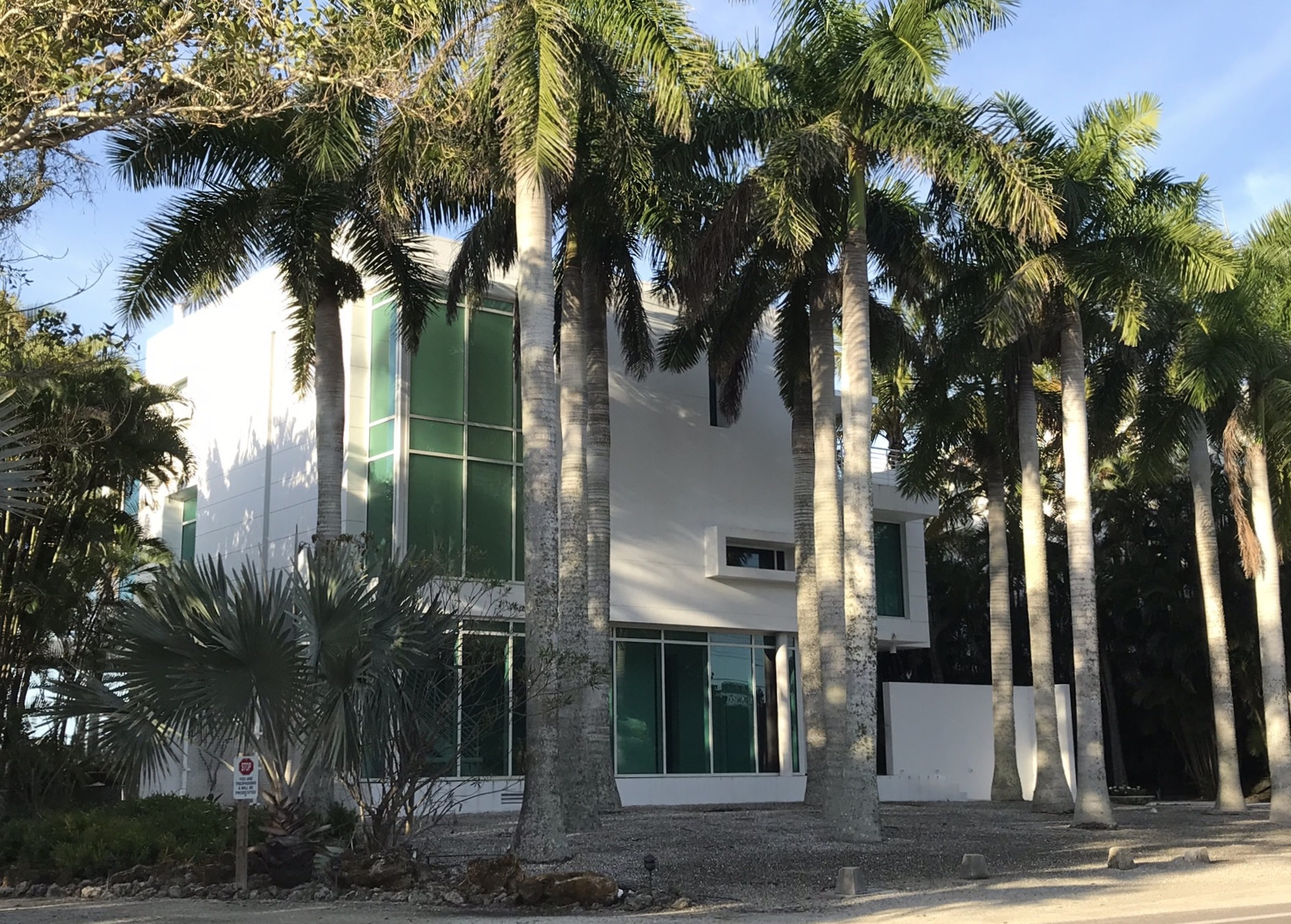
Anaclerio House

Peterson was born to Wesley and Joan Peterson in Cheyenne, Wyoming. Shortly after his birth, Peterson's physician father moved to Sarasota, Florida to open a medical practice. Living in Sarasota, his adolescence was spent surrounded by great architecture, as the city was home to the Sarasota School of Architecture. Peterson lived near the Sanderling Beach Club and attended high school at Riverview High School, both designed by architect Paul Rudolph. He was particularly influenced by the Syd Solomon Studio on Siesta Key by Gene Leedy. He attended college at the University of Florida earning a bachelor's degree in design and a master's degree in architecture. He opened an architecture office in Sarasota in the late 1980s, offering commercial and residential design services.

Over the next four decades, Peterson designed over 200 structures in southwest Florida. Some of his private works are Spencer House, Theisen House, Freund House, Ashridge House, Durbin House, Ohana Retreat, and Anaclerio House. His public work includes Girl Scout Gulf Coast Headquarters, Sarasota Memorial Hospital Critical Care Center, SPARCC Shelter, Selby Memorial, Midway Fire Station, Longboat Key Police Station, the Elling Eide Center, and the Nathan Benderson Park Finish Tower.

Throughout his career, Peterson has done numerous pro-bono projects for non-profit organizations, including the creation of UF CityLab Sarasota and the renovation and preservation of several historic Sarasota School designs. Peterson restored the architecturally significant Revere Quality House in 2007, and it was added to the U.S. National Register of Historic Places the following year. He also restored the Scott Building (designed by Paul Rudolph assistants William Rupp and Joseph Farrell), converting it into the Center for Architecture Sarasota, a community-based architecture/cultural organization. Renamed the McCulloch Pavilion, the renovated work was included in the U.S. National Register of Historic Places in 2017.

Peterson is a frequent lecturer on architecture and an adjunct professor of architecture at the University of Florida.

== Notable career achievements ==
Peterson has earned more than 80 individual architectural design awards throughout his career.

- He was awarded the American Institute of Architects Florida Gold Medal in 2016.
- He was elected into the College of Fellows of the American Institute of Architects (FAIA) in 2003.
- He received the AIA Florida Presidential Millennium Award of Honor for Design in 2000.
- The Guy Peterson Office for Architecture was awarded the AIA Florida Firm of the Year in 2013.
- He has also been recognized for career achievements by the University of Florida School of Architecture (Ivan H. Smith Eminent Chair - Endowed Professorship, Distinguished Architecture Alumnus Award, and Dean's Faculty Service Award), the Sarasota Architectural Foundation (Lifetime Achievement Award), and the American Jewish Committee (Civic Achievement Award).

Peterson's architecture has been featured several times on television, including HGTV’s, Homes Across America (Theisen House and Freund House) and Open House (Freund House) on SNN. In 2018, Peterson's Spencer House was selected for the television show The World's Most Extraordinary Homes, (Season 2, Episode 4 "USA"), broadcast worldwide on the BBC and on Netflix.

== Selected architecture / design awards ==
The American Institute of Architects – AIA Florida – Award for Excellence in Architecture:

- 2017 Elling Eide Center - Honor Award of Excellence – Sarasota, Florida
- 2014 Spencer House – Honor Award of Excellence – Sarasota, Florida
- 2011 Revere Quality House Addition & Restoration - Honor Award of Excellence – Sarasota, Florida
- 2001 Freund House – Honor Award – Siesta Key, Florida
- 1999 Theisen House – Bradenton, Florida
- 1998 Test of Time Award of Honor In Design

The American Institute of Architects (Florida) – Unbuilt Design Award:

- 2016 Nathan Benderson Park Finish Tower - Honor Award – Sarasota, Florida

The American Institute of Architects (Florida) – Excellence for Historic Preservation and Restoration:

- 2015 Center For Architecture Sarasota | UF CityLab Sarasota – Honor Award – Sarasota, Florida

The American Institute of Architects – Florida Gulf Coast Chapter – Award of Excellence in Architecture:

- 2014 Durbin House – Award of Excellence – Casey Key, Florida
- 2012 Spencer Residence – Award of Excellence – Sarasota, Florida
- 1997 Theisen House – Bradenton, Florida

== Bibliography and media ==
- Peterson, Guy (May 15, 2015). Naked: The Architecture of Guy Peterson (PDF). Oro Editions. p. 268. ISBN 978-1941806555.
- Saxon, Henry (February 2010). Four Florida Moderns - The Architecture of Alberto Alfonzo, Rene Gonzalez, Chad Oppenheim, and Guy Peterson. W.W. Norton & Company. ISBN 978-0-393-73274-0.
- Sinovcic, Damir (March 9, 2012). 50 U.S. Architects: Residential & Planning. Design Book Press. ISBN 9781936344048.
- Boekel, Andrea (2006). 50+ Vacation Homes: Great Retreats of the World. Victoria, Australia: Image Publishing Group. pp. 212–215 (Sanderling Beach House). ISBN 9781920744991.
- Sinovcic, Damir &, Dunlop, Beth (October 10, 2010). 100 Florida Architects and Interior Designers (PDF). Architecture + Design Publications. ISBN 978-1936344000.
- Weaving, Andrew (November 7, 2006). Sarasota Modern. Rizzoli New York. ISBN 9780847828722.
- Greer, Bailey, and Howey (2000). Florida Architecture: A Celebration. Florida Association of the American Institute of Architects. ISBN 9780970359001.
- Boekel, Andrea (September 25, 2007). Residential Style: International Spaces Series. Images Publishing - Architecture + Design. ISBN 9781920744366.
