= Healy Guest House =

20th-century house in Florida

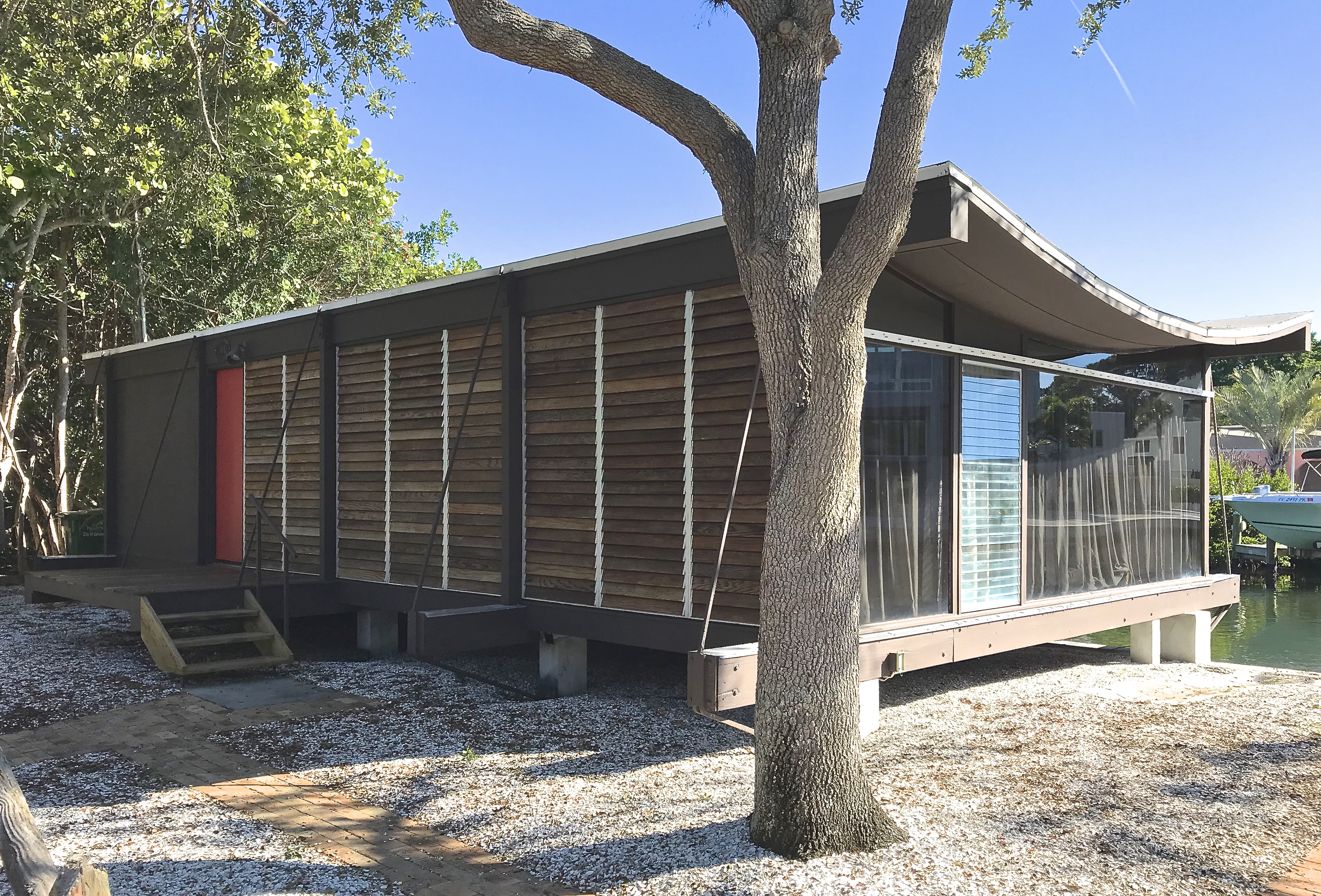
- Interactive map of Healy Guest House

General information
- Type: Residential guest house
- Architectural style: Modern architecture Sarasota School of Architecture
- Location: Siesta Key, Florida
- Coordinates: 27°18′05″N 82°33′33″W
- Completed: 1950–1951
- Renovated: 1990

Design and construction
- Architects: Twitchell and Rudolph (Ralph Twitchell and Paul Rudolph)

The Healy Guest House (nicknamed the Cocoon House) is a small guest cottage located in Siesta Key, Florida, originally built for Mr. and Mrs. W. R. Healy. It was designed in 1948 by Paul Rudolph and Ralph Twitchell during their five-year partnership that sparked a modern architecture movement in Florida; the Sarasota School of Architecture. Its radical shape, featuring an inverted catenary roof, was an experiment in structure and technology. It is considered one of the most significant architectural works of the twentieth-century.

== Concept ==
The Healys were Ralph Twitchell's in-laws. Twitchell secured a small patch of land along Bayou Louise on which to build the project. Paul Rudolph produced a series of simplified initial concept drawings for a single-story, two-bedroom, open plan rectangle with a platform floor lifted above grade and with a porch section cantilevered over the adjacent lagoon. With no interior load-bearing walls, the suspended catenary roof would be supported by tensioned steel straps fastened along the base of the structure.

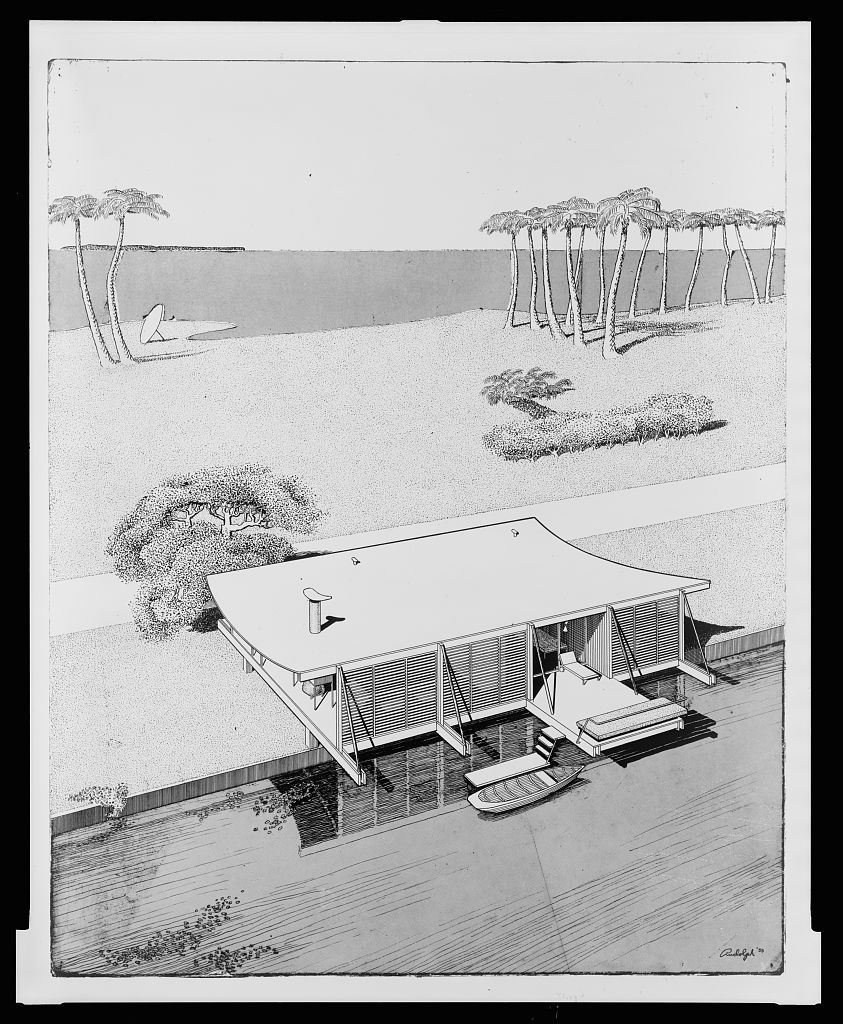
Paul Rudolph's Concept Drawing for Cocoon House (Library of Congress)

The roof, itself, would be constructed of flexible ceiling panels sprayed with saran-vinyl compounds developed by the military during World War II. The compounds had been originally developed to coat U.S. Navy ships when they were being mothballed for storage. Rudolph learned that this process was known as ‘cocooning’ when he was supervising ship construction at the Brooklyn Navy Yard during the war. Thus emerged the nickname of the cottage ... ‘’Cocoon House’’.

The longitudinal walls on both sides would be entirely constructed of a series of wooden jalousie blinds that could be closed for privacy and protection, or opened for a near-360 degree view. The end walls would be made exclusively of glass. Rudolph's elegant plan of virtual transparency was designed to facilitate a complete sensory experience, encompassing the sights, sounds, and even smells of the site, but its avant-garde design would prove a challenge to build.

== Construction ==
In addition to being an architect, Twitchell was an experienced builder. He was familiar with the materials required construction of modern structures, such as poured concrete, steel beams, metal straps, tensioning rods, and guy wires. He was one of few people in 1950 to be able to translate Rudolph's plans into reality.

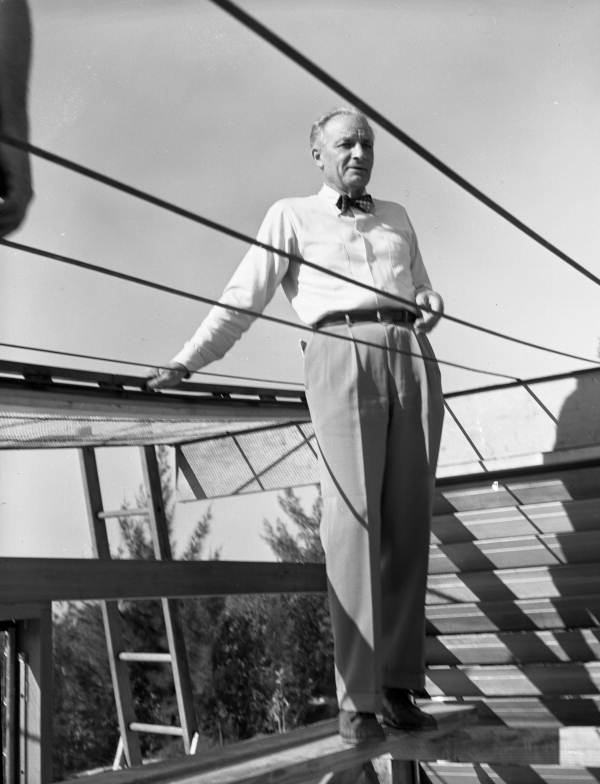
Architect Ralph Twitchell at the Cocoon House (State Library & Archives of Florida)

The project was literally built from the ground up. A concrete seawall and platform were fabricated, on which an out-rigger beam frame was built. Jalousie walls were fabricated onsite with vertical beam framing and topped with large roof rail beams. These unsupported wall sections required significant bracing, since the end walls would be non-structural glass panels. When window contractors approached Rudolph regarding the structural continuity of frameless glazing, the architect dismissively retorted "The glass will stiffen it up."

The construction of the roof was a multi-step process. Steel support bars were fastened to footings, wrapped over the outriggers and to the roof beams. Strapping was welded along the roof beams and loosely hung, spanning the width of the house. These straps provided the naturally-curved ‘frame’ on which construction flexible insulation panels were placed. Alternating layers of spray-vinyl polymer and flexible panels gradually formed a structural roof. A slate blue colored polymer was used for the interior ceiling of the house.

== Consensus ==
Even before it was built, the ‘’Cocoon House’’ created a sensation. The American Institute of Architects named the unbuilt work as its ‘’Best House Design of the Year’’ in 1949. Upon completion, feature articles appeared in Architectural Forum (June 1951), Interiors (June 1951), House Beautiful (July 1952), and Florida Architect (April 1958).

Among architectural scholars, the radical design of the Cocoon House is ranked among the greatest modern works of the period. In 1953, the Metropolitan Museum of Art published an assessment of American modern architecture in a volume entitled Built in USA: Post-War Architecture. Forty-three buildings (nineteen of which were houses) were represented as "the most significant examples of modern architecture built in this country since 1945". The Cocoon House is included in that collection, alongside the Philip Johnson Glass House, Charles Eames Eames House, Mies van der Rohe Farnsworth House, and Frank Lloyd Wright Jacobs House.

The U.S. Library of Congress designated the Healy Guest House as an "American Treasure". It was designated as a historic property by the City of Sarasota in 1985.

Despite being the first building to give national recognition to architect Paul Rudolph, he considered the project a failure, "It was okay on the outside, but the interior was not successful. The apparent instability of the sagging ceiling and the thrusting space upward to the perimeter, inviting you to leave – this violated the essential nature of an intimate, domestic space. The Healy Cottage taught me that the physiological nature of a space in every building was really more important than the form of the structure."

The building fell into severe disrepair in the 1980s. The roof failed. At the turn of the millennium, there was a resurgence in interest in the landmark and a major conservation effort restored the house to its original condition.

== Photos: The Cocoon House under construction ==
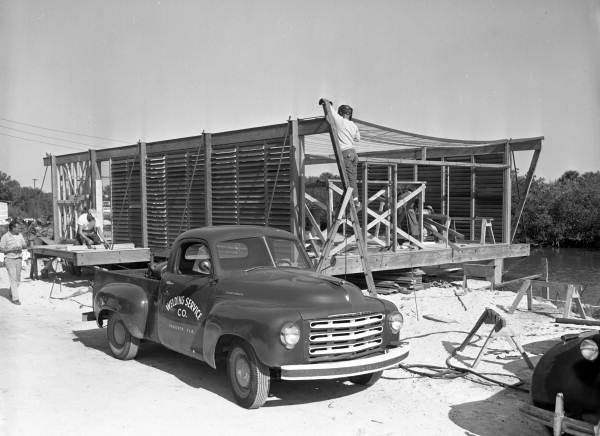
Cocoon House (Construction - Roof installation, 1951)

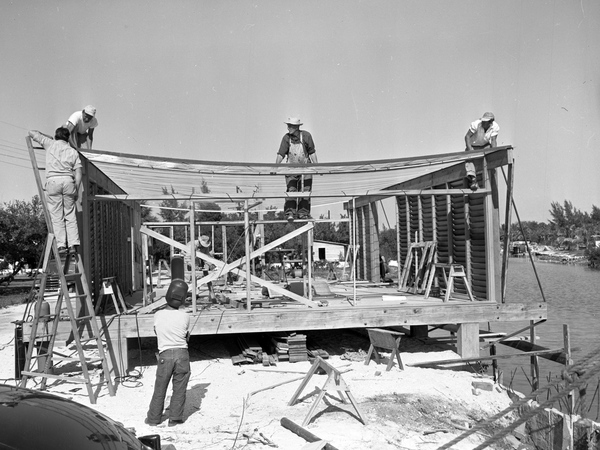
Cocoon House (Construction - Preparing for inverted catenary roof, 1951)

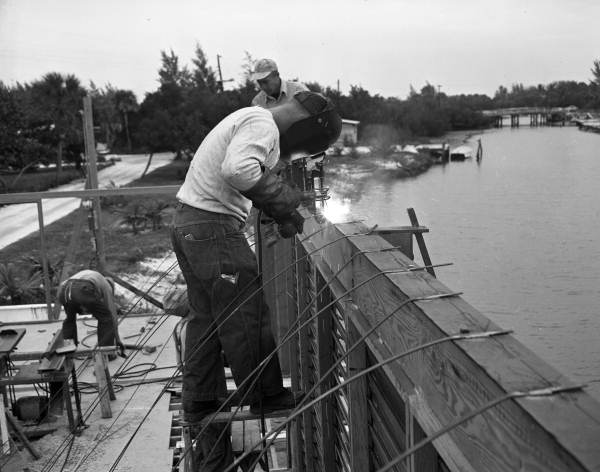
Cocoon House (Construction - Welding steel roof straps, 1951)

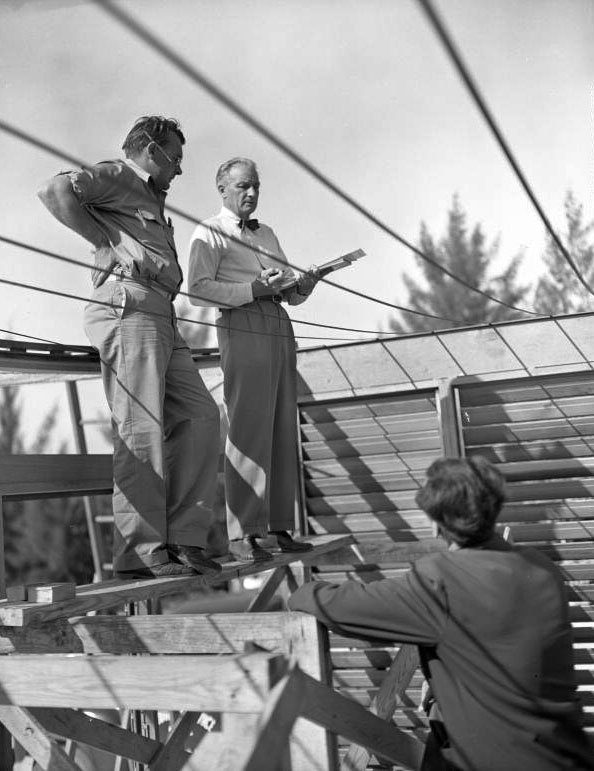
Cocoon House (Construction - Ralph Twitchell on site, 1951)

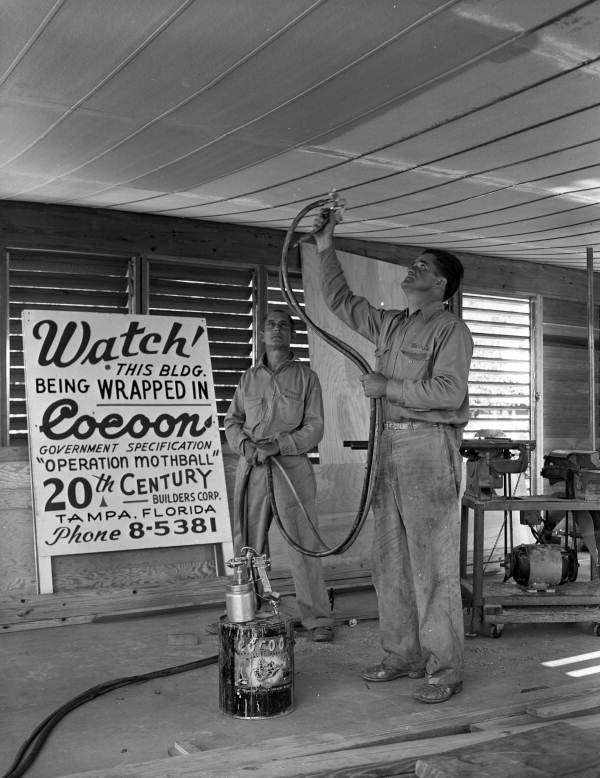
Cocoon House (Construction - Cocoon spray on ceiling, 1951)

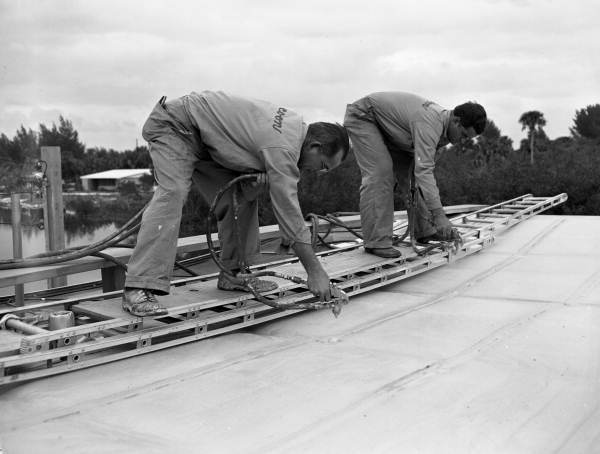
Cocoon House (Construction - Cocoon spray on roof, 1951)

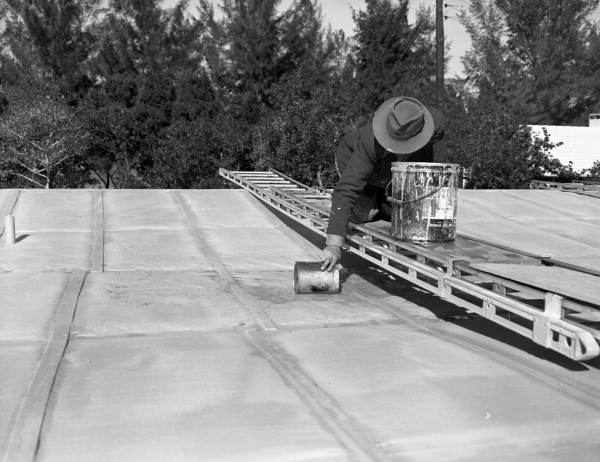
Cocoon House (Construction - Spreading liquid roof, 1951)

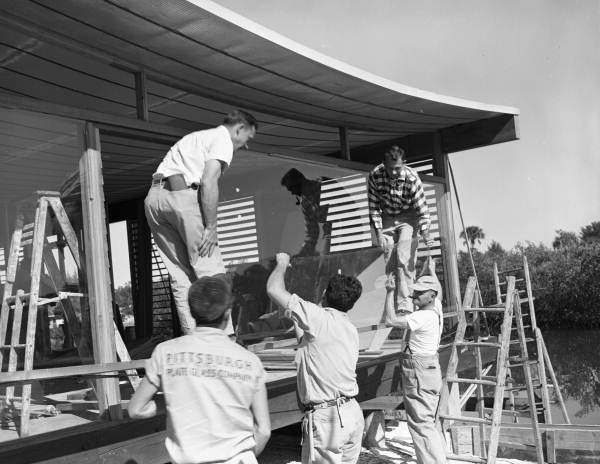
Cocoon House (Construction - Installing plate glass window, 1951)

== Bibliography ==
- Hitchcock, Henry-Russell and Drexler, Arthur (1952). Built in USA; post-war architecture (PDF). New York, NY: Museum of Modern Art. pp. 111–113. ISBN 978-1258490690.
- Howey, John (1995). The Sarasota School of Architecture: 1941 - 1966. Cambridge, MA: MIT Press. p. 209. ISBN 978-0262082402.
- King, Joseph and Domin, Christopher (February 1, 2002). Paul Rudolph: The Florida Houses. Princeton Architectural Press. p. 248. ISBN 9781568982663.
- Rudolph, Paul (2009). Writings on Architecture. Yale University Press. p. 164. ISBN 9780300150926.
- Rice, Patty Jo (1992). Interpreting Moods in Sticks, Stones, and Sunshine: The Life and Architecture of Ralph Twitchell. University of South Florida. p. 324.
- Peter, John (1958). Masters of Modern Architecture. Bonanza Books. p. 230. ISBN 9781499386165.
- Hochstim, Jan (2005). Florida Modern : Residential Architecture 1945-1970. Rizzoli New York. pp. 170–179. ISBN 978-0847826032.
- Weaving, Andrew (2005). The Home Modernized. London Jacqui Small LLP.
- Weaving, Andrew (2006). Sarasota Modern. Rizzoli New York. ISBN 9780847828722.
- McClintock, Mike (January 1989). Alternative Housebuilding. Sterling Publishing. p. 384. ISBN 978-0806969954.
