= Scott Commercial Building =

- U.S. National Register of Historic Places
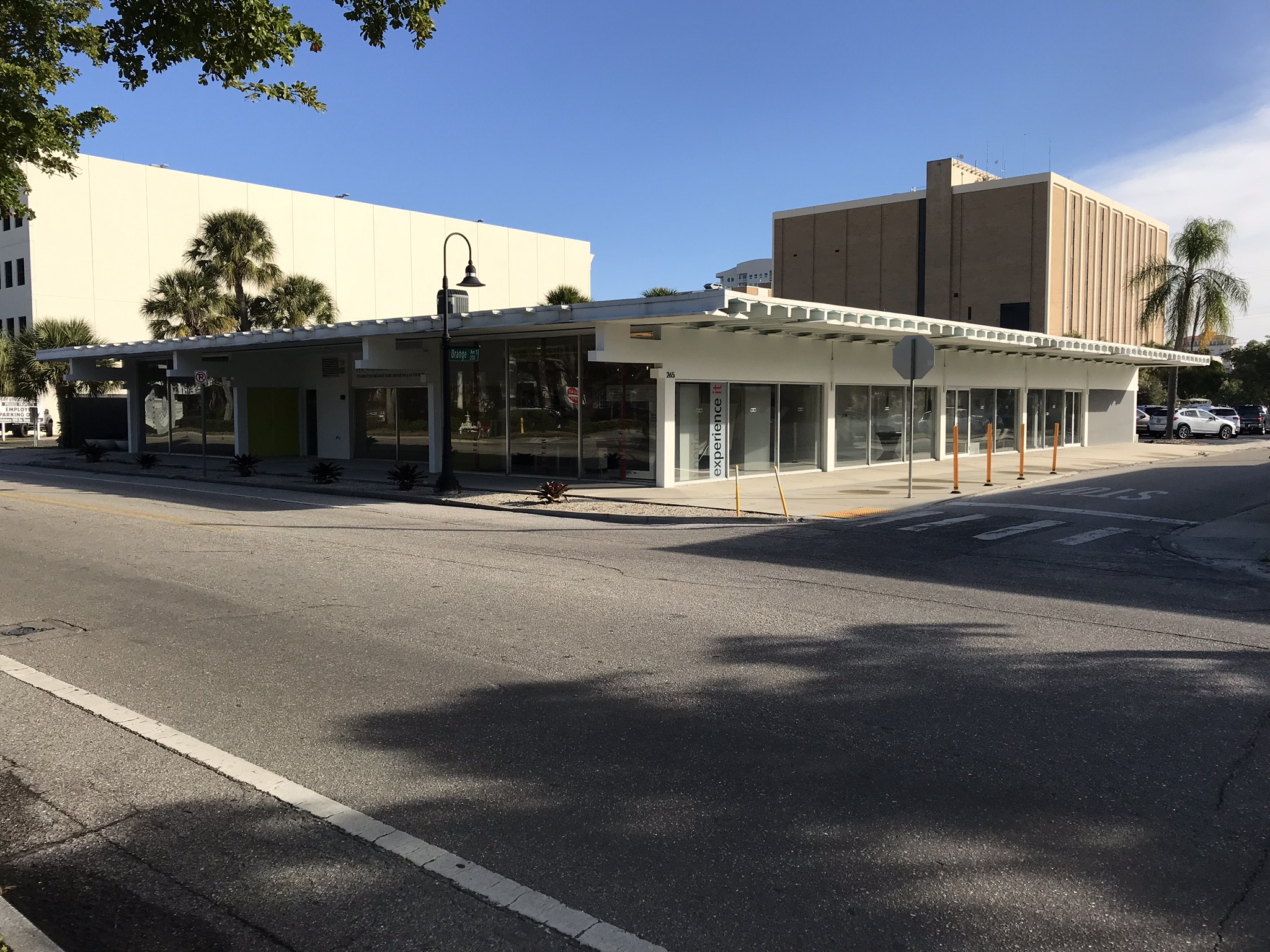
- McCulloch Pavilion - Center For Architecture Sarasota (Restoration by Guy Peterson, Architect, FAIA)

- Location within Florida Location within the United States
- Location: 261 South Orange Avenue; Sarasota, Florida
- Coordinates: 27.3340°N 82.5383°W
- Area: Less than one-acre
- Built: 1960
- Built by: W. Ray Mathis
- Architect: William Rupp; Joseph Farrell
- Architectural style: Sarasota School of Architecture
- MPS: Sarasota School of Architecture
- NRHP reference No.: 14001116
- Added to NRHP: June 7, 2016

The Scott Commercial Building is a historic building located in Sarasota, Florida at 261 South Orange Avenue.

== History ==
In 1959, Clarence Scott commissioned William Rupp and Joseph Farrell to design a commercial building that would serve as a showroom for the Barkus Furniture Company. Rupp and Farrell designed the building the following year. The building displays the characteristics of the Sarasota School of Architecture in planning and design, which was a prominent design in Central Florida. The building features a stucco exterior, large picture windows, and large extending concrete rafter beams.

In 2016, the building was restored by architect Guy Peterson and builder Michael Walker. It was rededicated as McCulloch Pavilion and now serves as the Center for Architecture Sarasota, a community-based architecture/cultural organization. On June 7, 2016, the building was added to the National Register of Historic Places.
