= Jack West (architect) =

American architect

Jack West (August 9, 1922 – October 25, 2010) was an architect in Sarasota, Florida and briefly in Southern California. West was one of the leaders of the Sarasota School of Architecture.

West was born in Galesburg Illinois in 1922 and served in the Pacific Ocean with the U.S. Navy during World War II. After the war, he attended Yale University School of Architecture, graduating in 1949. He moved to Sarasota and worked for the firm of Twitchell and Rudolph with Ralph Twitchell and Paul Rudolph as a draftsman and then as an architect. In 1951 West opened his own firm.

From 1953 to 1954 he formed a partnership with Twitchell. From 1956 to 1960, West formed a partnership with architect Elizabeth Boylston Waters. In 1965 he joined Rolland W. Sellew to do U.S. Department of Housing and Urban Development work. In 1966 West partnered with engineer Al Conyers to create the firm of West and Conyers/Architects and Engineers, which lasted into the 1990s.

The Gateway Bank building on Tamiami Trail and Bahia Vista in Sarasota, built as the First Federal Savings and Loan Association of Manatee County, was designed by West in 1974. In 2009, there was a proposal to demolish it, but it was preserved with support of Kafi Benz and local preservationists. The building's grounds include a sculpture by Jack Cartlidge original to the design.

== Work ==
- Myrtle West house (1951), built for his mother
- Knotts Glass House (1952–53), Yankeetown, Florida, with Ralph Twitchell.
- Hudson House, Venice, Florida (1953), as Twitchell and West
- Nokomis Beach Pavilion, (1954, renovated 2008), listed on the National Register of Historic Places
- Warm Mineral Springs Facilities and Cyclorama, North Port, Florida, (1956)
- Oxford House, Sarasota, Florida, (1956)
- Englewood Elementary School and Fruitville Elementary School Addition (1958), as part of West and Waters in partnership with Bolton McBryde out of Fort Myers, Florida
- Hilton and Dorothy Leech Art Studio, Sarasota (1960), used today as a residence and known as "The Round House."
- Tuttle Elementary School, Sarasota, Florida (1960)
- Courtyard House for Arvida Corporation, Bird Key, Sarasota, Florida (1964) with interior designer Terry Rowe, Homes for Better Living Award winner, published in Architectural Record Houses of 1965.
- Sarasota City Hall (1965)
- Municipal Auditorium-Recreation Club renovations, Sarasota, Florida (1970s)
- First Federal Savings and Loan Association of Manatee County, Sarasota, Florida (1974) - renovated in 2009 by Gateway Bank
- Public Housing, Venice, Florida (demolished)
- Hunters Point House, Cortez, Florida
