= Architectural Forum =

American magazine

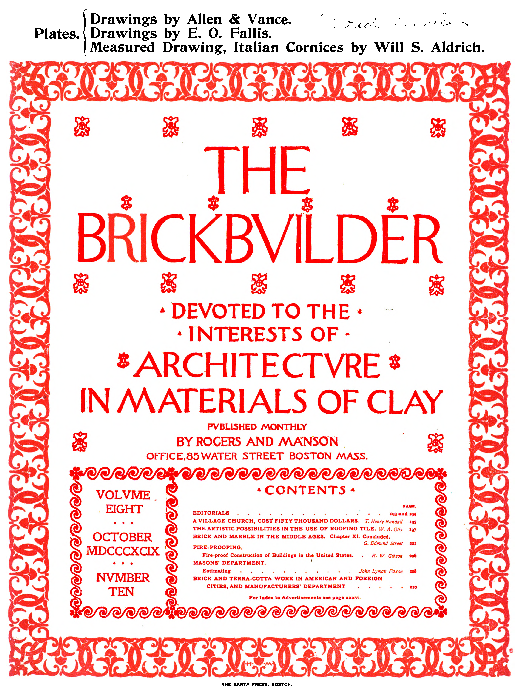
- 1899 cover of The Brickbuilder
- Categories: Architecture
- Frequency: Monthly
- First issue: January 1892; 133 years ago
- Final issue: March 1974
- Country: United States
- Based in: Boston, Massachusetts
- Language: English
- ISSN: 0003-8539

Architectural Forum was an American magazine that covered the homebuilding industry and architecture. Started in Boston, Massachusetts, in 1892 as The Brickbuilder, it absorbed the magazine Architect's World in October 1938. Ownership of the Forum passed from Time, Inc., Urban America, Inc., Whitney Publications, and finally to Billboard Publications in 1972. After the purchase of the Forum by Billboard, Peter Blake, its chief editor, and much of the staff left to form the magazine Architecture Plus in 1973. The Forum ceased publication in 1974.

Graphic designer Paul Rand designed two covers for the March and April 1945 issues.

== Content ==
The journal was published under various names throughout its history:

- 1892–1916: The Brickbuilder
- 1917–1974: Architectural Forum

For a time, the journal was branded with a subtitle, The Magazine of Building.

== 194X ==
194X was a term first used in the October 1943 issue of Architectural Forum. The issue focused on post-war urban and city planning, with the 'X' standing for the assumed end date of the war. The issue contained plans for shopping centers, housing, and schools based on the needs and size of a population. This was part of a larger shift in American culture, as many thought the end of the war would usher in a new era of architecture and urbanization that slowed down due to the war.
