= Hiss Residence =

Historic house in Florida, United States

- Hiss Residence (Umbrella House)
- U.S. National Register of Historic Places
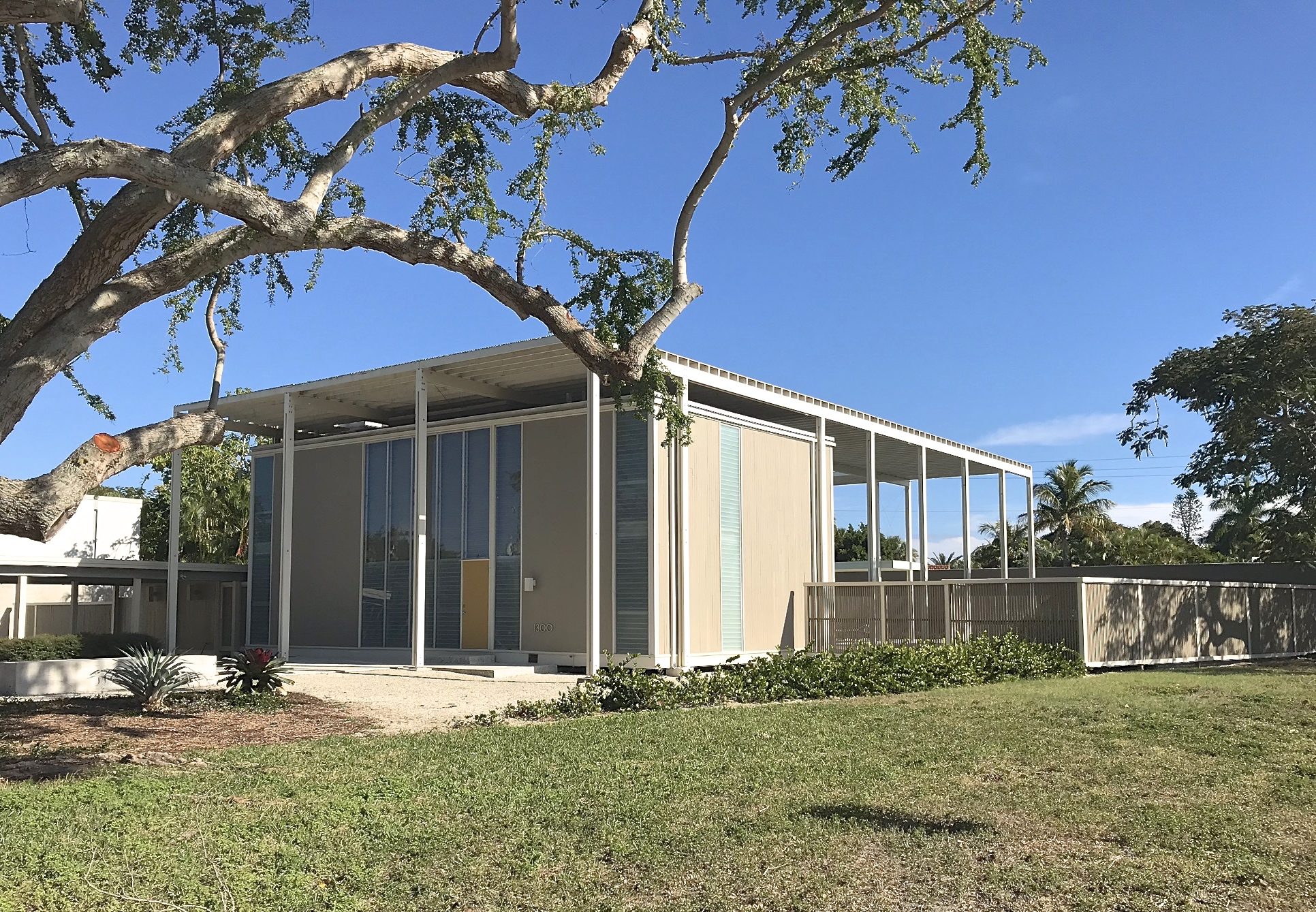

- Location within Florida Location within the United States
- Location: 1300 Westway Dr., Sarasota, Florida
- Coordinates: 27°19′44″N 82°35′01″W
- Built: 1953
- Architect: Paul Rudolph
- Architectural style: Modern, Sarasota School
- Restored: 2005, 2016
- MPS: Sarasota School of Architecture MPS
- NRHP reference No.: 100003417

The Hiss Residence (also known as the Umbrella House) is a mid-century modern home designed by architect, Paul Rudolph. Built as the show home for Sarasota's Lido Shores neighborhood in 1953, the structure blends international style modernism with indigenous tropical design. It is among the preeminent works of the Sarasota School of Architecture and considered “one of the most remarkable homes of the twentieth century.”

== Site-specific modern design ==
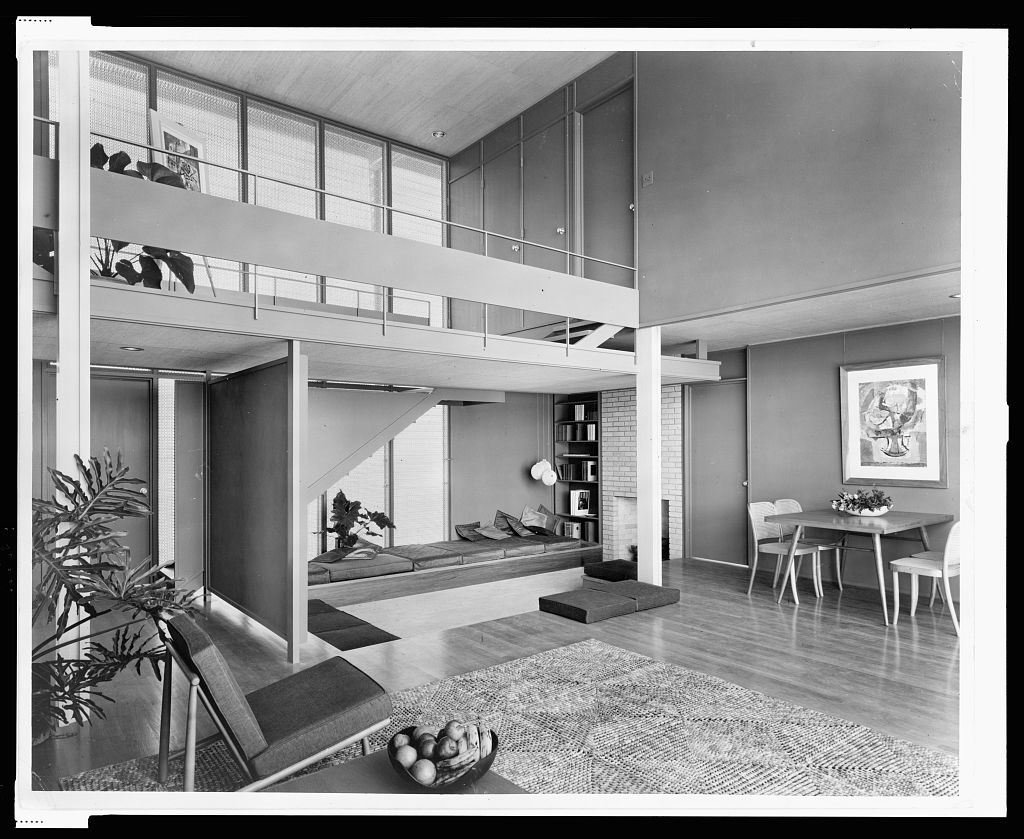
Umbrella House - Interior (Library of Congress)

Architect Paul Rudolph was approached by entrepreneur Philip Hanson Hiss III in 1952 to design a prototype home that would serve as a model for his Lido Shores real estate development, located on a small sand-covered spit of land between St. Armands Key and Longboat Key. Hiss was an enthusiastic supporter of mid-century modern architecture. He hoped that a radical new design might “catapult his Lido Shores development into the international spotlight.” Rudolph was launching his own independent architecture practice in Sarasota at the time and was willing to work on the project.

Rudolph was aware of Hiss’ interest in site-specific architecture (designed to integrate into its environment) and set to work on a configuration that was at once geometrically modern and in harmony with its locale. The result was a two-story, open-plan box concept, with operable jalousie windows on all sides to facilitate natural ventilation. Over this box was built a large simple frame with a latticed ‘parasol’ (flat umbrella roof) overlaying the house, the rear patio, and the pool. It served as a tropical pavilion, or pergola, creating patterns of shade over virtually the entire property. Rudolph designed this secondary roof to float slightly above the house roof in order to enable air movement and promote cooling.

The rectangular house was placed lengthwise on a north–south axis, while the pergola was overlaid lengthwise east–west. This positioning maximized interior light in living areas during the day. Despite its diminutive size (less than 1,500 square feet), the interior plan was a complex combination of transparent spaces and opaque walls, creating both privacy and spaciousness. The 17-foot-high vaulted ceiling, with floor-to-ceiling glass (front and back of the house), framed exterior views of both Sarasota Bay and the Gulf of Mexico from the second-floor bridge and bedroom balconies.

== Seeking purity in design ==
Rudolph had recently opened his own architecture practice after a five-year long partnership with Ralph Twitchell, and was beginning to define architecture on his own terms. This meant a departure from organic modernism in favor of more pristine and geometric design. William Rupp assisted Rudolph with a portion of the drafting of interiors for the Umbrella House. He recalled that Rudolph was obsessed with minimizing vertical supports for the stairs and balconies and hiding tension members and bracing connections on the pergola roof. The focus was on purity of design and not so much on practicality of construction.

== Speculative success ==
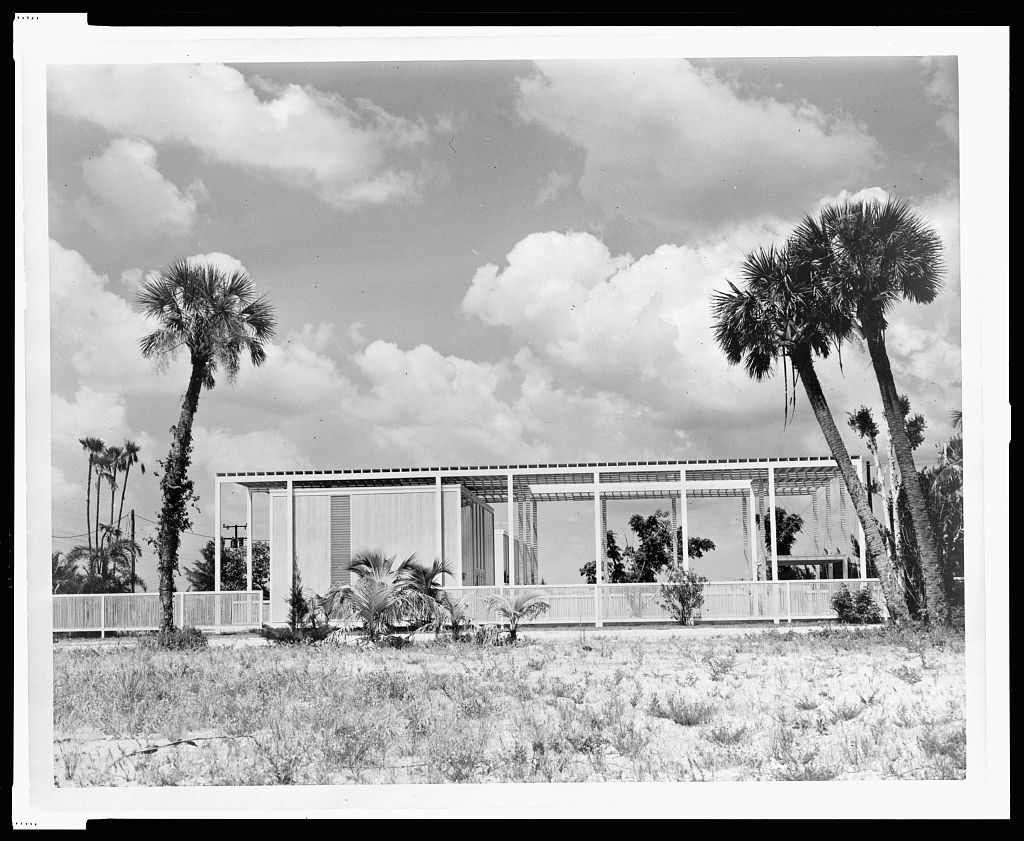
Umbrella House - Exterior (Library of Congress)

Hiss located the speculative house on a curve on John Ringling Parkway, where it would be seen by both passers-by and the press. Within weeks of completion, several thousand people had visited the house, with more than twenty-five thousand touring it in the first year. The project was featured in House & Home, House & Garden, Sarasota Review, Architectural Review, Art and Architecture, and L’Architecture D’Aujourd’hul. It was unanimously hailed as a ground-breaking work of modern architecture. The house was also recognized as a significant technical advancement in forward-thinking passive solar engineering and urban design.

Fifty years later, the Umbrella House was recognized by Architectural Digest as one of the most remarkable homes of the twentieth century. The American Institute of Architects designated the Umbrella House as one of the 100 Most Important Buildings In Florida. In 2018, Rudolph's Umbrella House was included in the book, The Iconic House: American Masterworks Since 1900.

The Umbrella House represents one of the earliest and most influential works of the Sarasota School of Architecture movement, and helped pave the way for the development of Lido Shores and the surrounding islands as a hotbed of mid-century modern architecture, that now includes works by Tim Seibert, Gene Leedy, Victor Lundy, Carl Abbott, William Rupp, and Guy Peterson.

== Saving the Umbrella House ==
In 1966, the pavilion roof was blown off the house by Hurricane Alma, and over the following thirty years, the home slowly fell into disrepair. In 2005, the building was partially restored and auctioned as “a piece of art” with no takers. It was eventually sold to private conservators who professionally restored the house to its original 1953 condition, including most of the pergola roof. The conservation effort received several awards, including the AIA Honor Award of Excellence for Historic Preservation (2016) and Florida Trust for Historic Preservation Outstanding Achievement Award (2016).

In 2005, inspired by the Paul Rudolph Umbrella House, architect Lawrence Scarpa designed and built his own "Solar Umbrella House". It was recognized by the American Institute of Architects as one of their "Top Ten Green Projects" in 2006.

In 2018, the State of Florida Bureau of Historic Preservation nominated the Umbrella House to the U.S. National Register of Historic Places; the listing was approved in 2019. It has been designated as a historic landmark by the City of Sarasota.

The Umbrella House was highlighted as one of fifteen important Paul Rudolph designs to be exhibited as part of the Paul Rudolph At 100 celebration sponsored by the U.S. Library of Congress (September 18 - November 8, 2018).

Architecture Sarasota maintains and supports the Umbrella House through lectures, tours, and other activities, with the goal of preserving it as a landmark work of the Sarasota School of Architecture.

== Bibliography ==
- King, Joseph and Domin, Christopher (February 1, 2002). Paul Rudolph: The Florida Houses. Princeton Architectural Press. p. 248. ISBN 9781568982663.
- Rudolph, Paul (2009). Writings on Architecture. Yale University Press. p. 164. ISBN 9780300150926.
- Rudolph, Paul (1970). The Architecture of Paul Rudolph. New York, New York: Praeger Publishing. ASIN B000MRIKOY.
- Hochstim, Jan (2005). Florida Modern : Residential Architecture 1945-1970. Rizzoli New York. pp. 170–179. ISBN 978-0847826032.
- Weaving, Andrew (2006). Sarasota Modern. Rizzoli New York. ISBN 9780847828722.
- Peter, John (1958). Masters of Modern Architecture. Bonanza Books. p. 230. ISBN 9781499386165.
- McCallum, Ian (1959). Architecture USA. New York, New York: Reinhold Publishing. ASIN B000GU4G9K.
- Bradbury, Dominic (2018). The Iconic House: Architectural Masterworks Since 1900. Thames and Hudson Press. p. 376. ISBN 9780500293942.
- Cantacuzino, Sherban (1964). Modern Houses of the World. New York, New York: Dutton Publishing. ISBN 9780289279700. Archived from the original on January 3, 2019.
- Olgyay, Aladar, and Olgyay, Victor (1957). Solar Control and Shading Devices. Princeton: Princeton Press. ISBN 9780691023588.
- Howey, John (1995). The Sarasota School of Architecture: 1941 - 1966. Cambridge, MA: MIT Press. p. 209. ISBN 978-0262082402.
