= Tim Seibert =

American architect (1927–2018)

Edward John "Tim" Seibert
- Born: February 6, 1927; Seattle, Washington
- Died: December 2, 2018 (aged 91); Boca Grande, Florida
- Education: Stanford University; University of Florida; B.A. Design (Architecture)
- Occupation: Architect (FAIA)
- Awards: AIA College of Fellows, AIA Test of Time Award, AIA Award of Excellence, SAF Lifetime Achievement Award, University of Florida Citation of Merit, University of Florida Distinguished Alumni Award
- Practice: Paul Rudolph Architects; Seibert Architects
- Buildings: Hiss Studio; Bayport Beach and Tennis Club, Bay Plaza; Beachplace; Inn on the Beach; Siesta Key Beach Pavilion; Lido Beach Pavilion; MacDonald House; Cooney House; Mitchell House; Seibert House
- Website: seibertarchitects.com

Edward John "Tim" Seibert (September 27, 1927—December 2, 2018) was an architect based in Sarasota, Florida. Seibert was a Fellow of the American Institute of Architects and one of the founders of the modern movement known as the Sarasota School of Architecture.

== Personal life and career ==
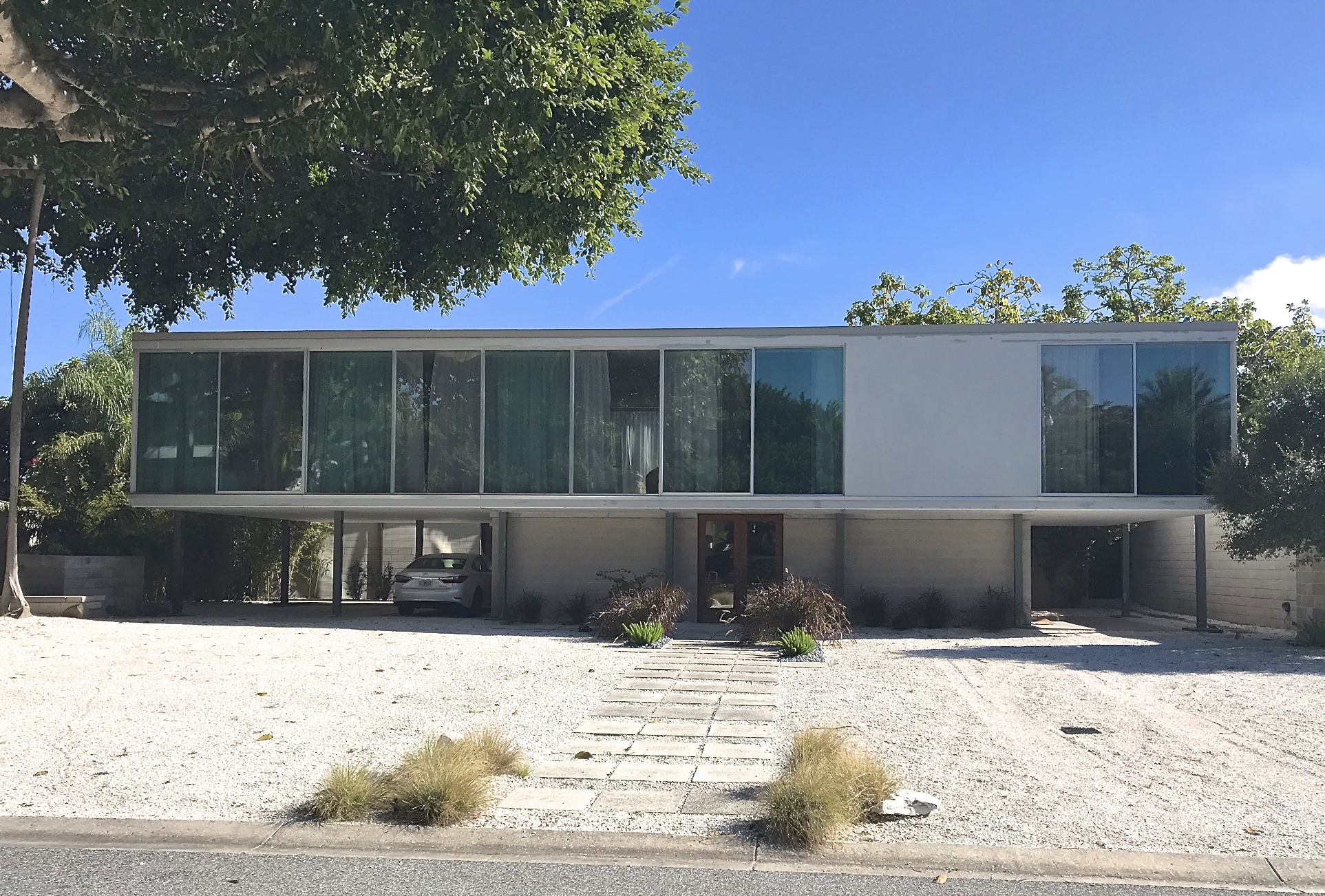
Hiss Studio (Tim Seibert, Architect, FAIA)

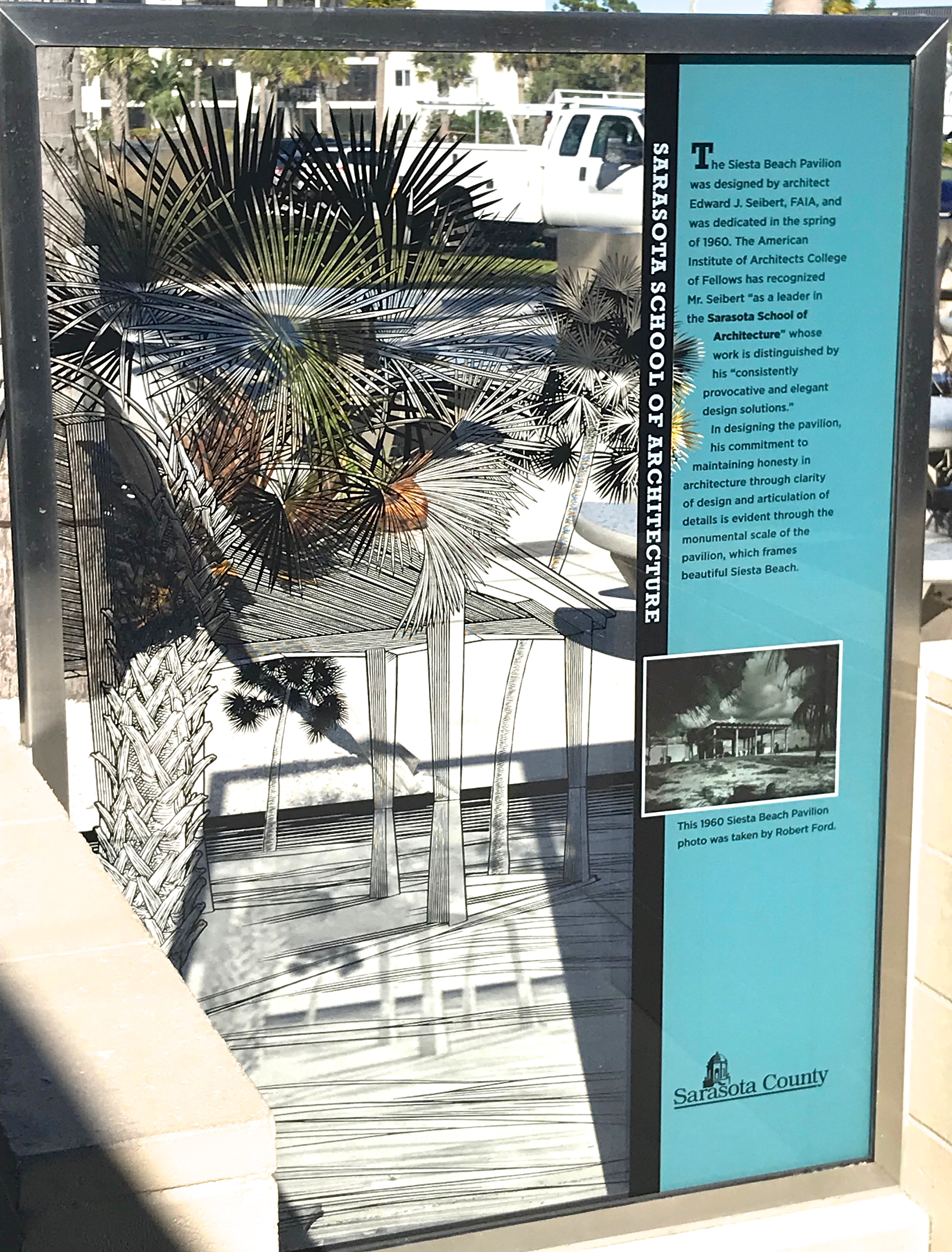
Siesta Key Beach Pavilion Sign (Honoring Tim Seibert)

Seibert was born in Seattle, Washington on September 27, 1927, to Lt. Commander Edward C. and Elizabeth Seibert. His naval officer father was a civil engineer, and designed naval bases in the years prior to World War II. The family was stationed in Hawaii during Seibert's adolescence. His parents were artists and intellectuals. He was home-schooled and was raised speaking Chaucerian English. In 1942, when his father retired from the service, the family moved to Sarasota, Florida.

One of the interests that Seibert inherited from his father was sailing. They shared their interest in sailing together, and Seibert followed his father into the U.S. Navy during and shortly after World War II. Post-war, he attended Stanford University to study art, but transferred to the University of Florida to study architecture.

As a new graduate, Seibert apprenticed in the office of architect Paul Rudolph in Sarasota. There, he was exposed to Rudolph's design philosophy and architectural approach. Seibert once recalled Rudolph jotting a harsh remark on one of his early drawings. Seibert acknowledged that while such criticism was painful, he became a far better architect because of it. He and Rudolph ultimately became close friends.

One of Seibert's first architectural projects was for Philip Hanson Hiss III, a Sarasota real estate developer (Hiss Studio, designed in 1953). It was one of the first homes in Florida designed to accommodate air conditioning.

Seibert's house, located on an inlet of Siesta Key, was a small-scale crucible for his future designs, featuring many of the same elements. Both the Seibert House and Hiss Studio were recognized by the American Institute of Architects as examples of extraordinary design, earning the 25 year AIA Test of Time Award.

In 1955, Seibert opened his own architecture firm, Seibert Architects. There he met some of his 'Sarasota School' peers, such as Gene Leedy and Victor Lundy. Their shared vision of 'clarity of concept (geometry)' and 'honest use of materials' helped define the modern movement known as the Sarasota School of Architecture.

I was a different kind of architect ... I liked my clients.

— Tim Seibert

Over the next forty years, Seibert designed hundreds of structures, both residential and commercial, along Sarasota's gulf coast. His work with Arvida Development Corporation on Longboat Key resulted in the construction of buildings such as Far Horizons, Avenue of the Flowers, Beachplace Condominiums, Bayport Beach and Tennis Club, Inn on the Beach, and Sunset Place. At one point, Longboat Key city officials were certain that Seibert was involved in eighty percent of the development of the island.

Other local work includes the Bay Plaza Condominium and additions to the Field Club in Sarasota, Craig Residence, Mitchell House, Godfrey House, Dickerson Residence, 339-361 St. Armands Circle (Shopping District), Siesta Key Beach Pavilion, as well as the Siesta Key home of author John D. MacDonald. Examples of his coastal work also extend beyond Florida to Georgia (Skidaway Island), South Carolina (Seabrook Island), Hawaii, the Caribbean, and Australia (Lilian Bosch Residence).

== Notable career achievements ==
Seibert was elected to the College of Fellows of the American Institute of Architects in 1998, and he served as State Director and Gulf Coast Chapter president for the AIA. He won numerous professional awards for his innovative designs, including ‘’AIA Test of Time Awards’’ awards for the MacDonald Residence (1999), Cooney House (2001), Bayport Condominium (2006), Cichon/Mitchell House (2006 and 2016), Beach Pavilion (Siesta Key). Seibert received the AIA Award of Excellence for Lighthouse Point, Ringling Towers, and Inn on the Beach in 1985, and the MacDonald and Thyne-Swain Residences with the Award of Merit in 1972 and 1958. In 1961, Architectural Record gave Seibert their ‘’Award for Architectural Excellence’’ (Mitchell House).

The University of Florida School of Architecture awarded Seibert with its ‘’Citation of Merit’’ in 1964 for his outstanding service to architectural education. Thirty years later, in 1994, he received their ‘’Distinguished Alumni Award’’. Seibert was a member of the University of Florida President’s Council and served on the College of Architecture campaign committee in 1997. All of Seibert's drawings, photographs, project records and other papers are archived in the George A. Smathers Libraries at the University of Florida.

Seibert was awarded the Sarasota Architectural Foundation ‘’Lifetime Achievement Award’’ in 2017 and the American Jewish Committee’s ‘’Civic Achievement Award’’ in (2006).

In November 2017, the Center for Architecture Sarasota held a special exhibit of Tim Seibert's work including archival photos, renderings and drawings by University of Florida Graduate School of Architecture Students An Evaluation and Exploration of Tim Seibert's Life Works. He was also honored by the Sarasota Architectural Foundation with a three-day celebration and tour of his architecture for their fourth annual MOD Weekend.

== Accomplished sailor and award-winning boat designer ==
Seibert was also a competitive sailor, as well as award-winning boat designer. As a young boy, he learned the fine points of sailing from his father. Seibert raced competitively throughout the 1950s and 60s, including several Southern Ocean Racing Conference events from St. Petersburg, Florida to Havana, Cuba. He designed and built his own sloop, Annie-T in 1972. He was one of the founding members of the Boca Grande Yacht Club in 1996, and served as its Commodore from 1998-99.

As a retired architect, he created several award-winning sailboat designs, winning first place in the annual UK Classic Boat Magazine international design competition three times (2005, 2008, and 2012).

== Documentaries, architectural publications, and bibliography ==
Seibert has been the subject of two architectural documentaries. In 2001, the Fine Arts Society of Sarasota produced An American Legacy: The Sarasota School of Architecture profiling the modern architecture movement in Sarasota, featuring interviews with architects Victor Lundy, Gene Leedy, Tim Seibert, Jack West, and Carl Abbott. In 2014, Seibert was the subject of a documentary by independent filmmaker Larry Reinebach, entitled The Seibert Effect where Seibert's work and its continuing influence on the Sarasota area is contemplated by the architect, historians, and peers.

In 2014, the Tokyo Broadcasting System (BS-TBS) featured Seibert's Hiss Studio on their architectural television series ONE X TIME - The World Architecture.

Seibert's structures were featured in dozens of periodicals and trade journals, including Life Magazine, Better Homes & Gardens, House Beautiful, American Home, McCall’s, Dwell, and Architectural Record.

The following architectural resource books feature the work of architect Tim Seibert:

- Weaving, Andrew (2006). Sarasota Modern. Rizzoli New York. pp. 56–65. ISBN 9780847828722.
- Hochstim, Jan (April 18, 2024). Florida Modern : Residential Architecture 1945-1970. Rizzoli New York. pp. 170–179. ISBN 978-0847826032.
- Howey, John (1995). The Sarasota School of Architecture: 1941 - 1966. Cambridge, MA: MIT Press. p. 209. ISBN 0262082403.
- Wagner Jr., Walter (1976). Great Houses. New York, NY: McGraw-Hill.
- Weaving, Andrew (2005). The Home Modernized. London Jacqui Small LLP.
- McClintock, Mike (January 1989). Alternative Housebuilding. Sterling Publishing. p. 384. ISBN 978-0806969954.
- Haase, Ronald W. (1992). Classic Cracker. Sarasota, FL: Pineapple Press. p. 112. ISBN 9781561640133.

== Selected work ==
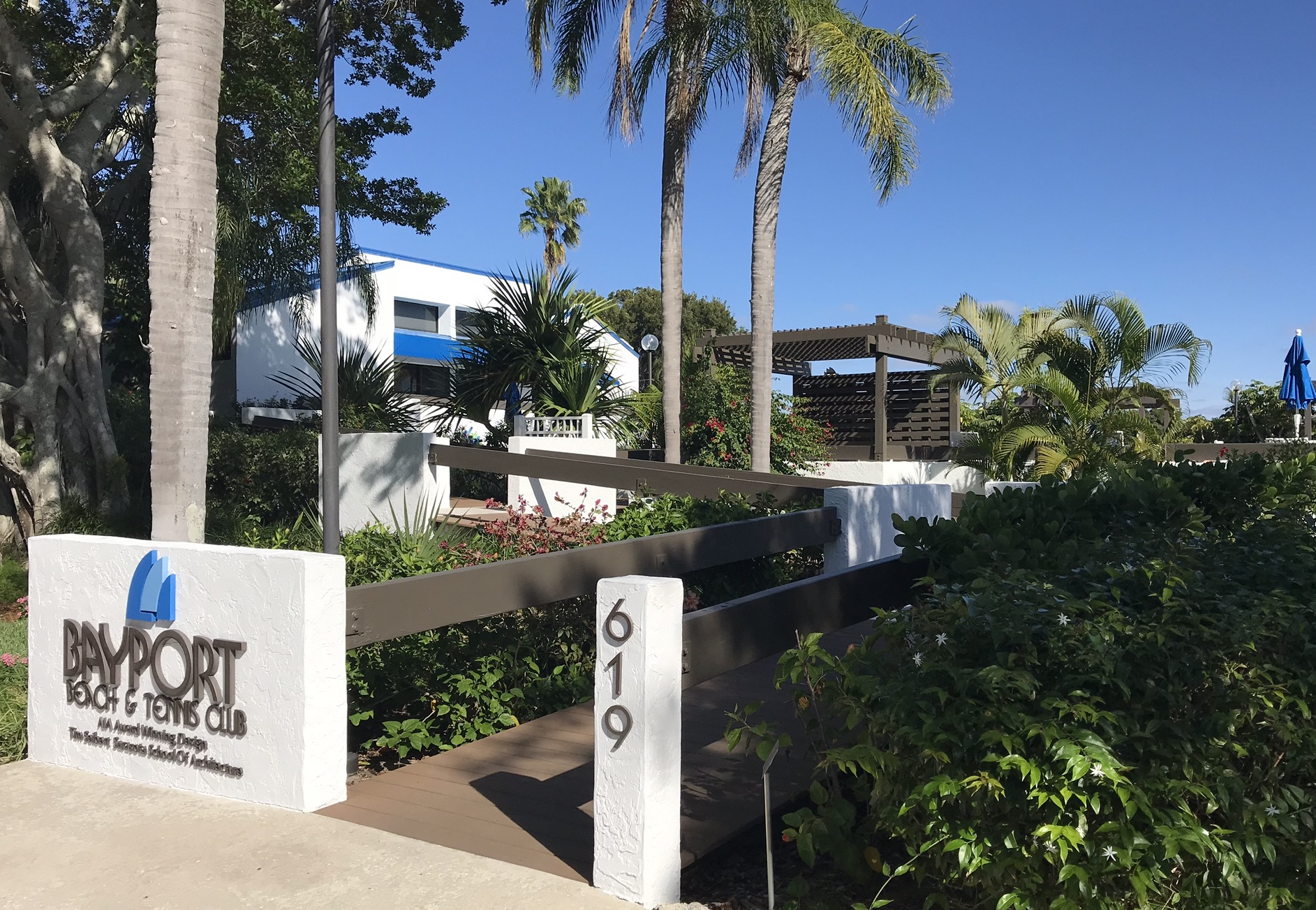
Bayport (Tim Seibert, Architect, FAIA)

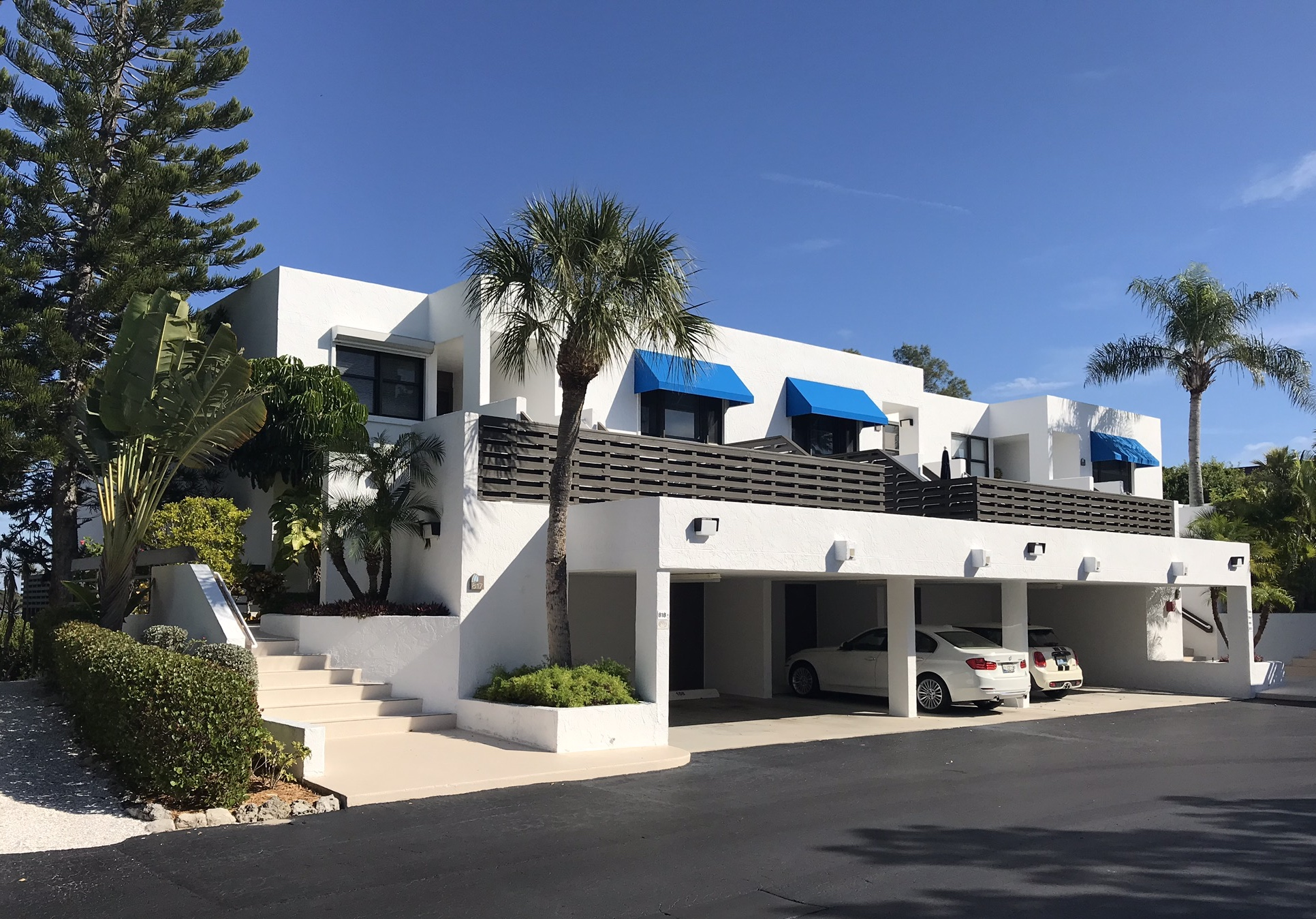
Bayport (Tim Seibert, Architect, FAIA)

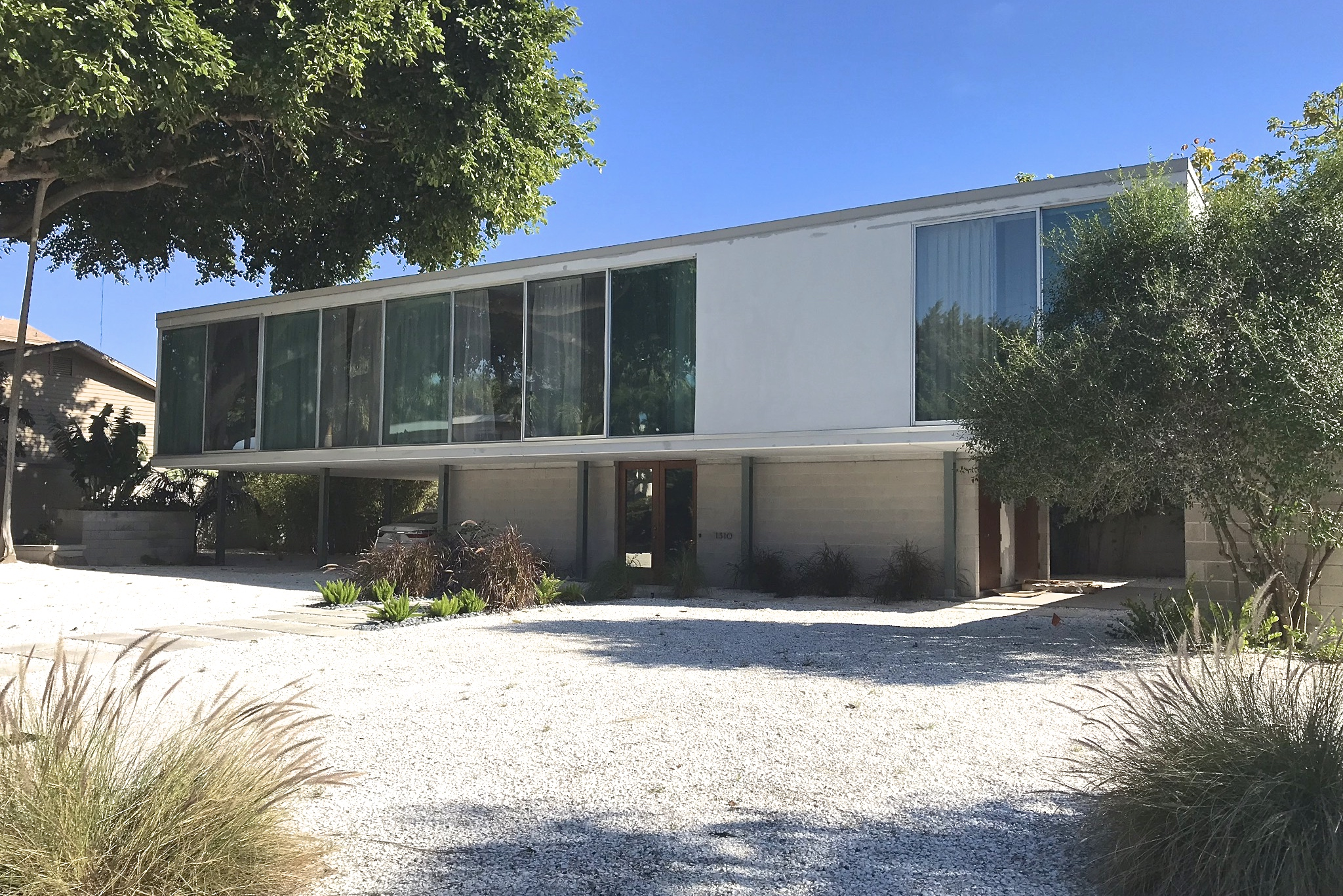
Hiss Studio (Tim Seibert, Architect, FAIA)

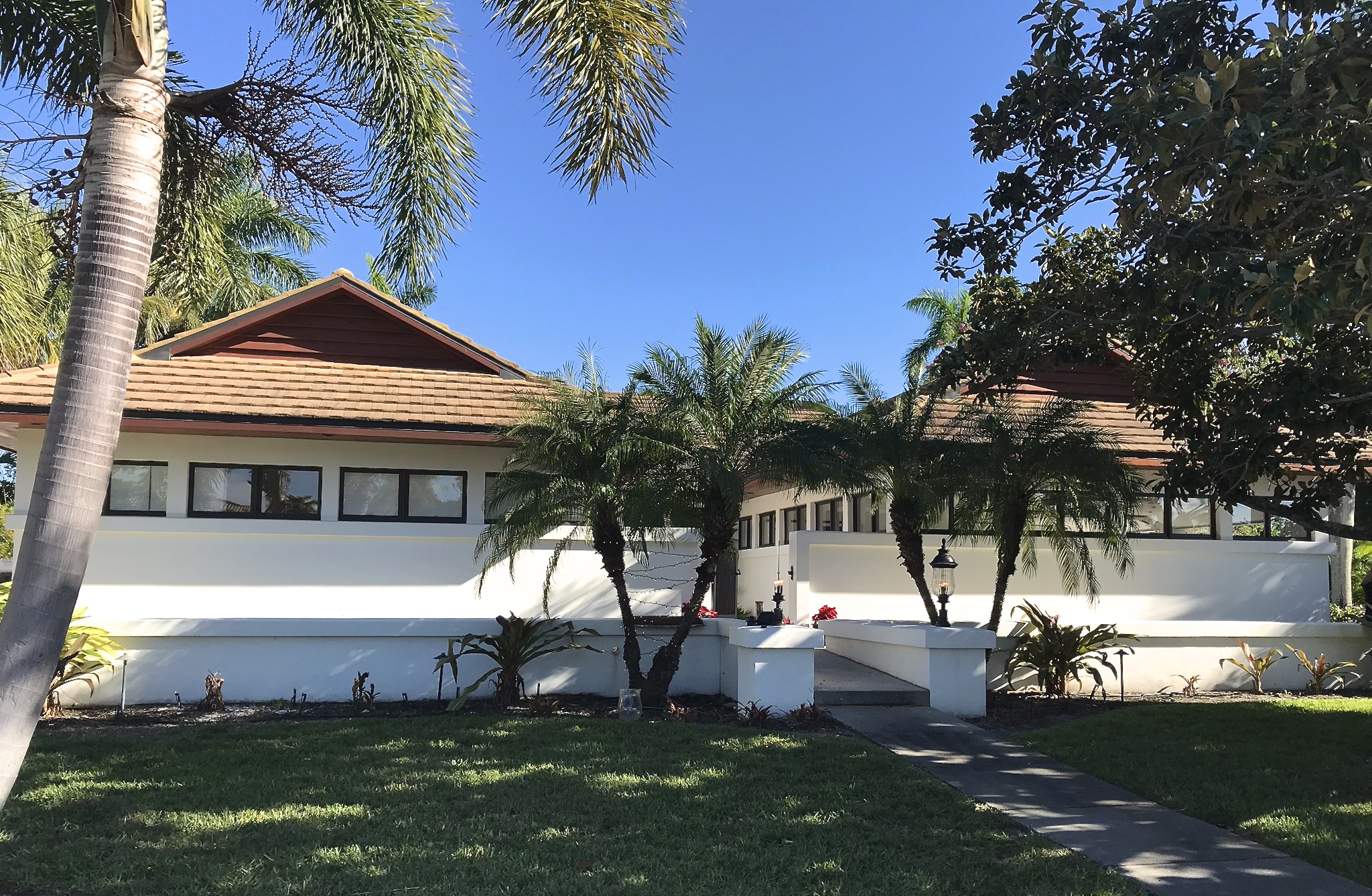
Bird Key House (Tim Seibert, Architect, FAIA)

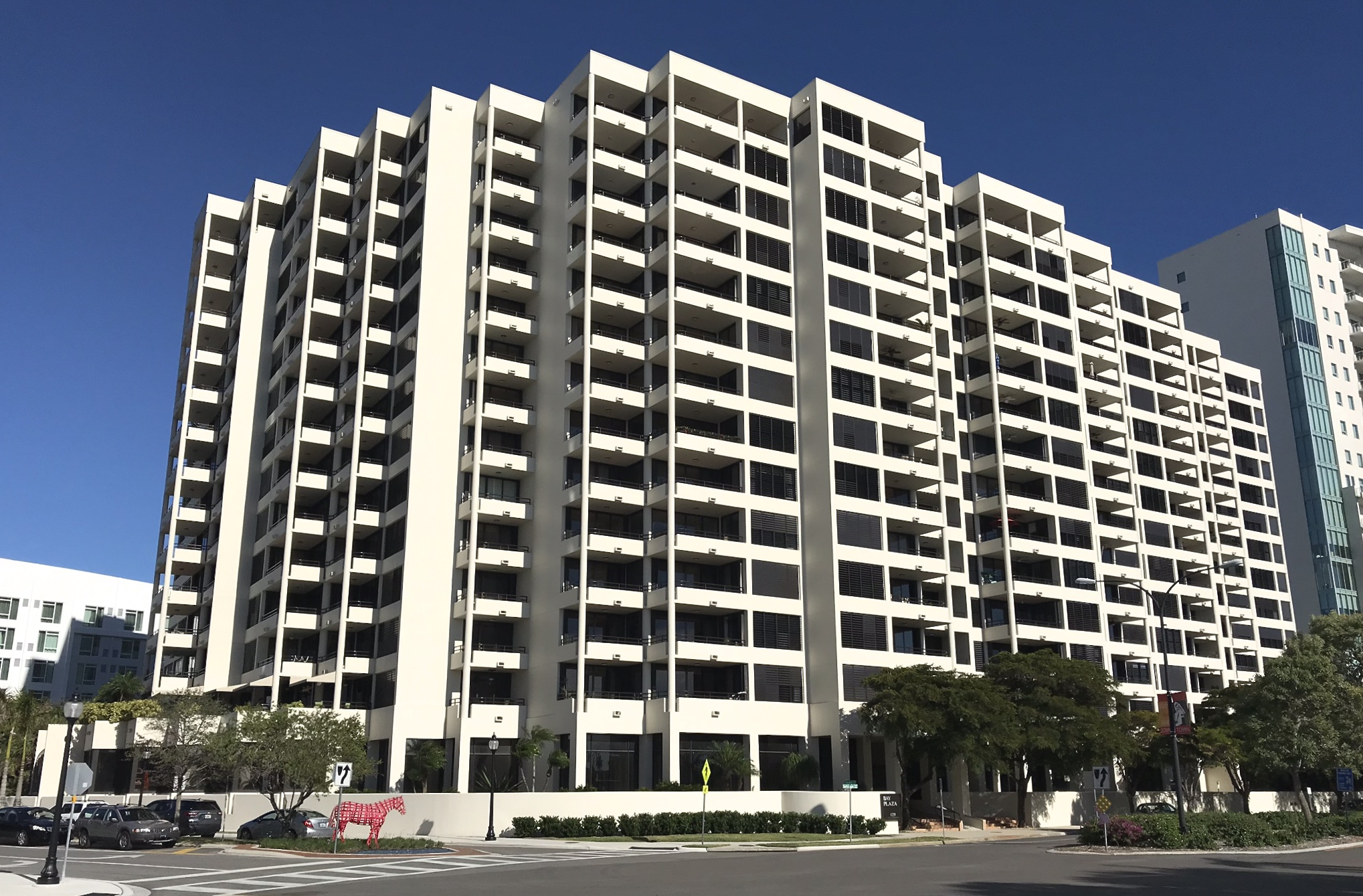
Bay Plaza (Tim Seibert, Architect, FAIA)

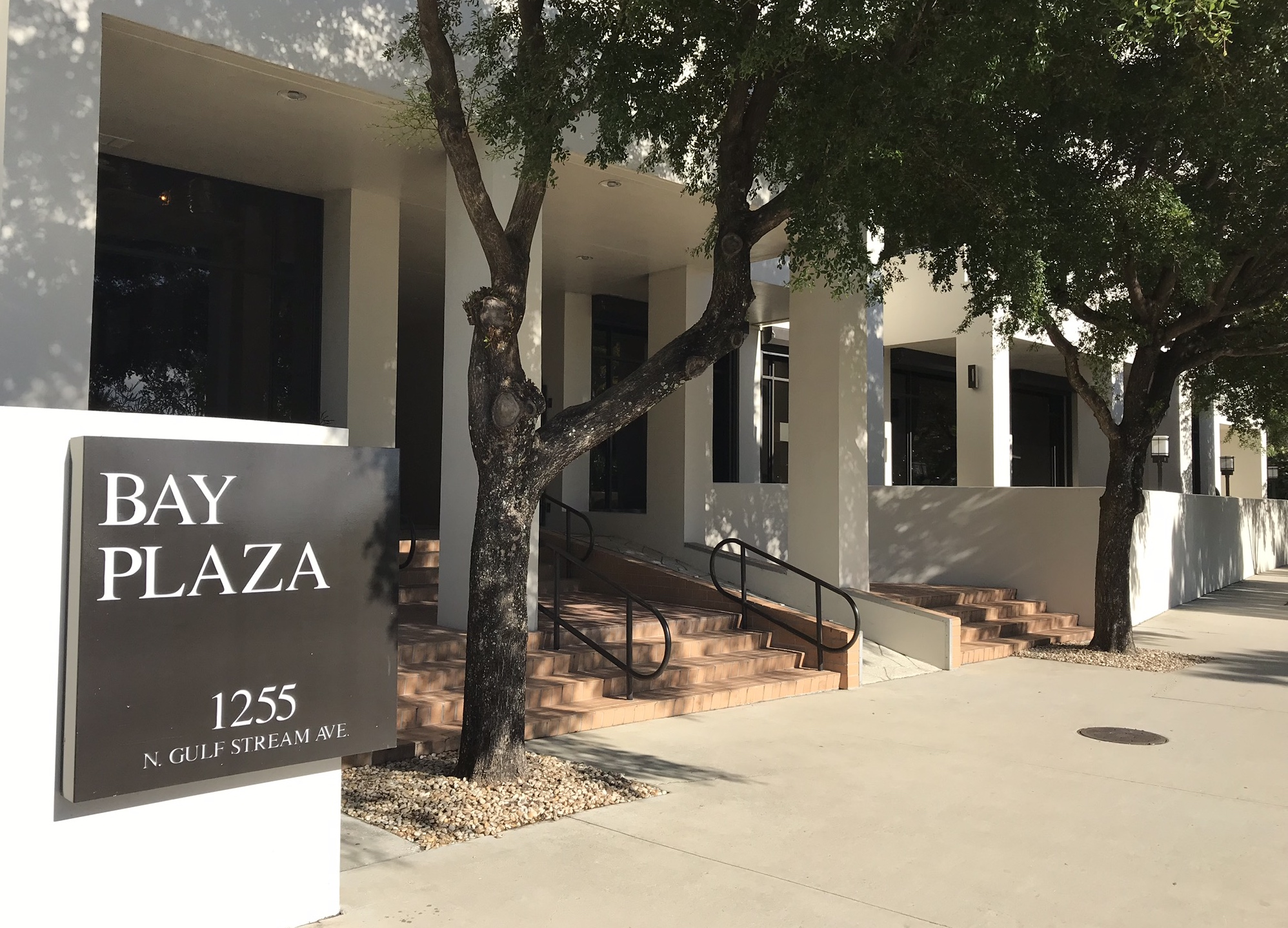
Bay Plaza (Tim Seibert, Architect, FAIA)

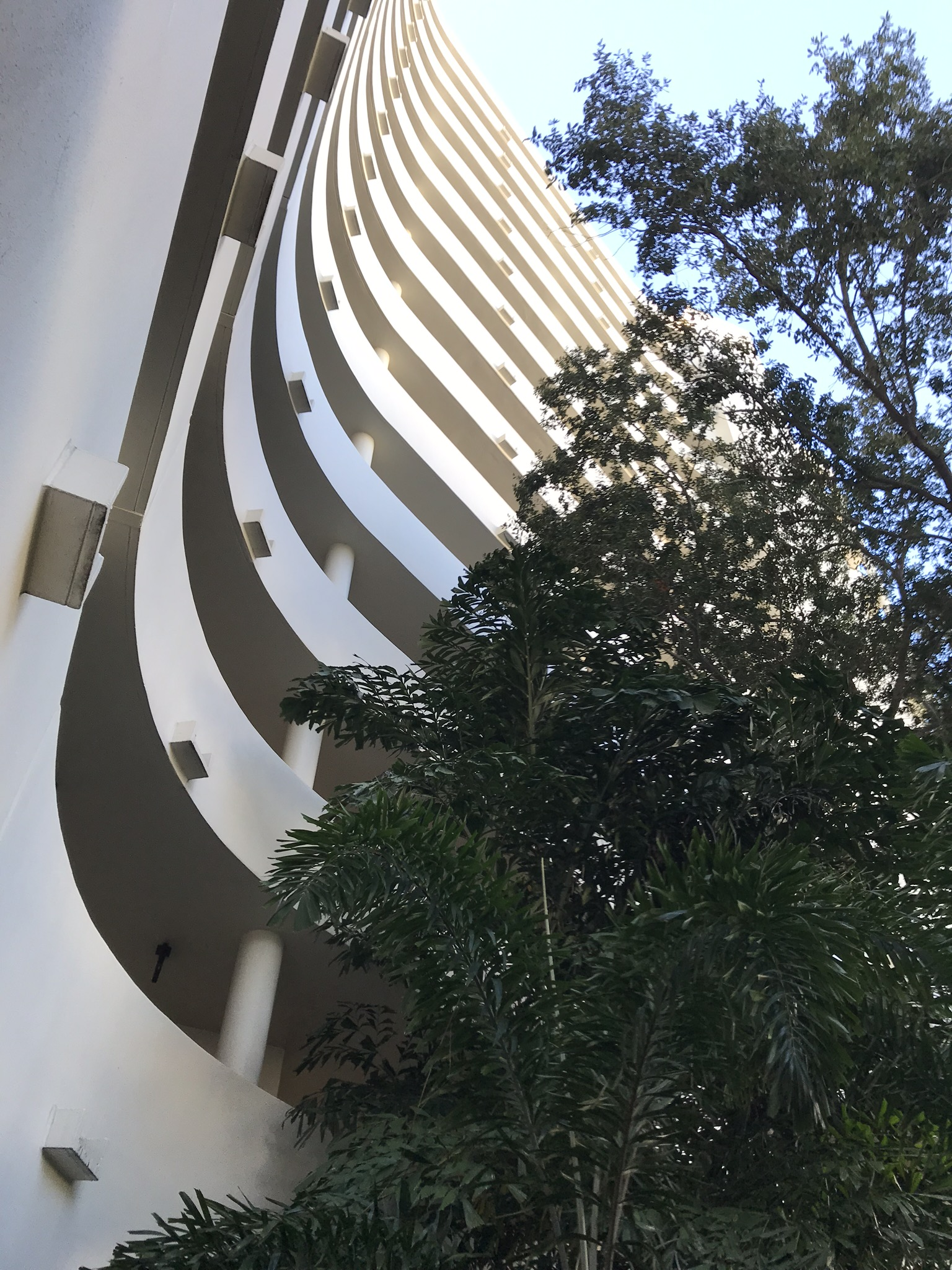
Bay Plaza (Tim Seibert, Architect, FAIA)

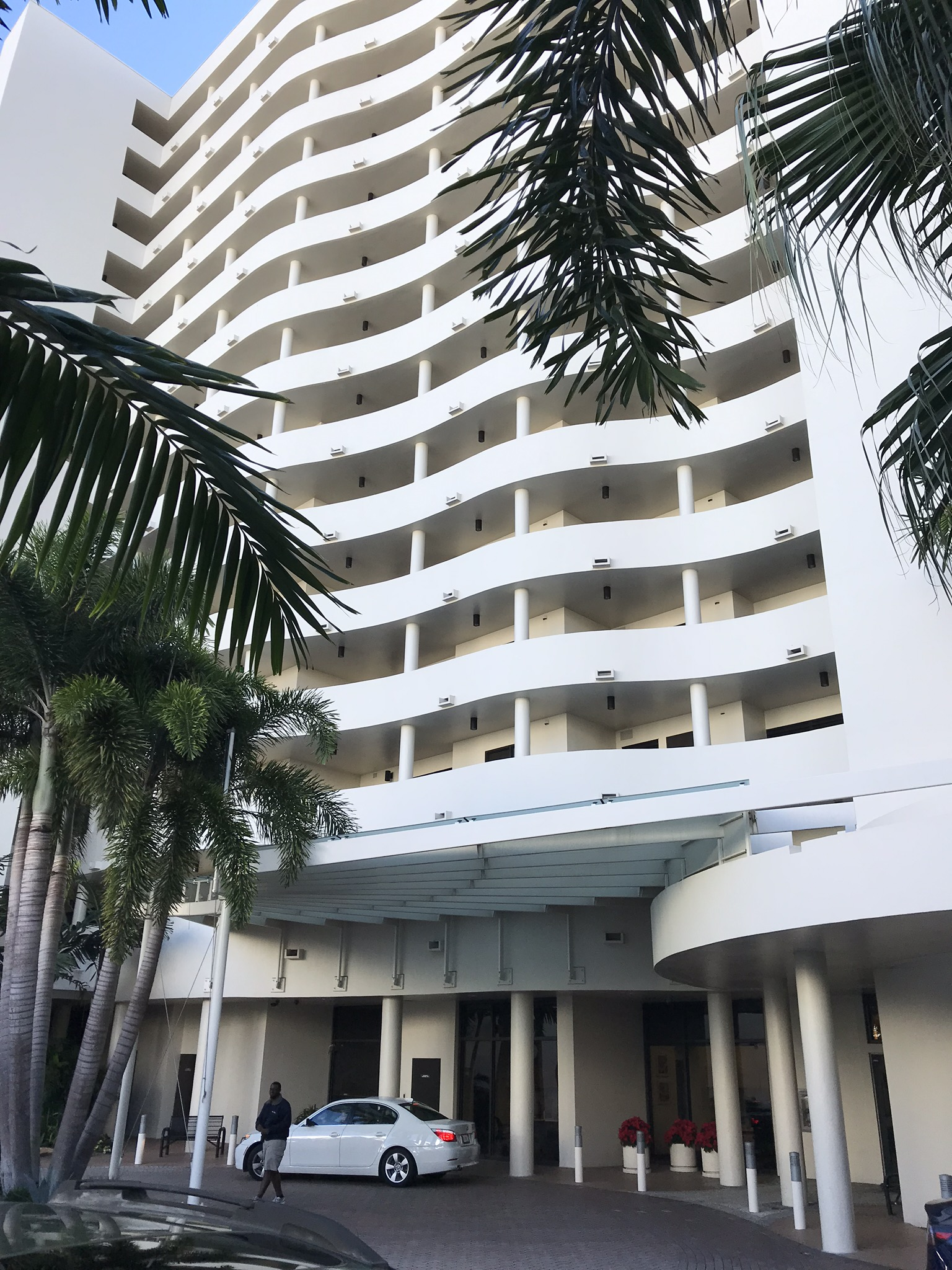
Bay Plaza (Tim Seibert, Architect, FAIA)

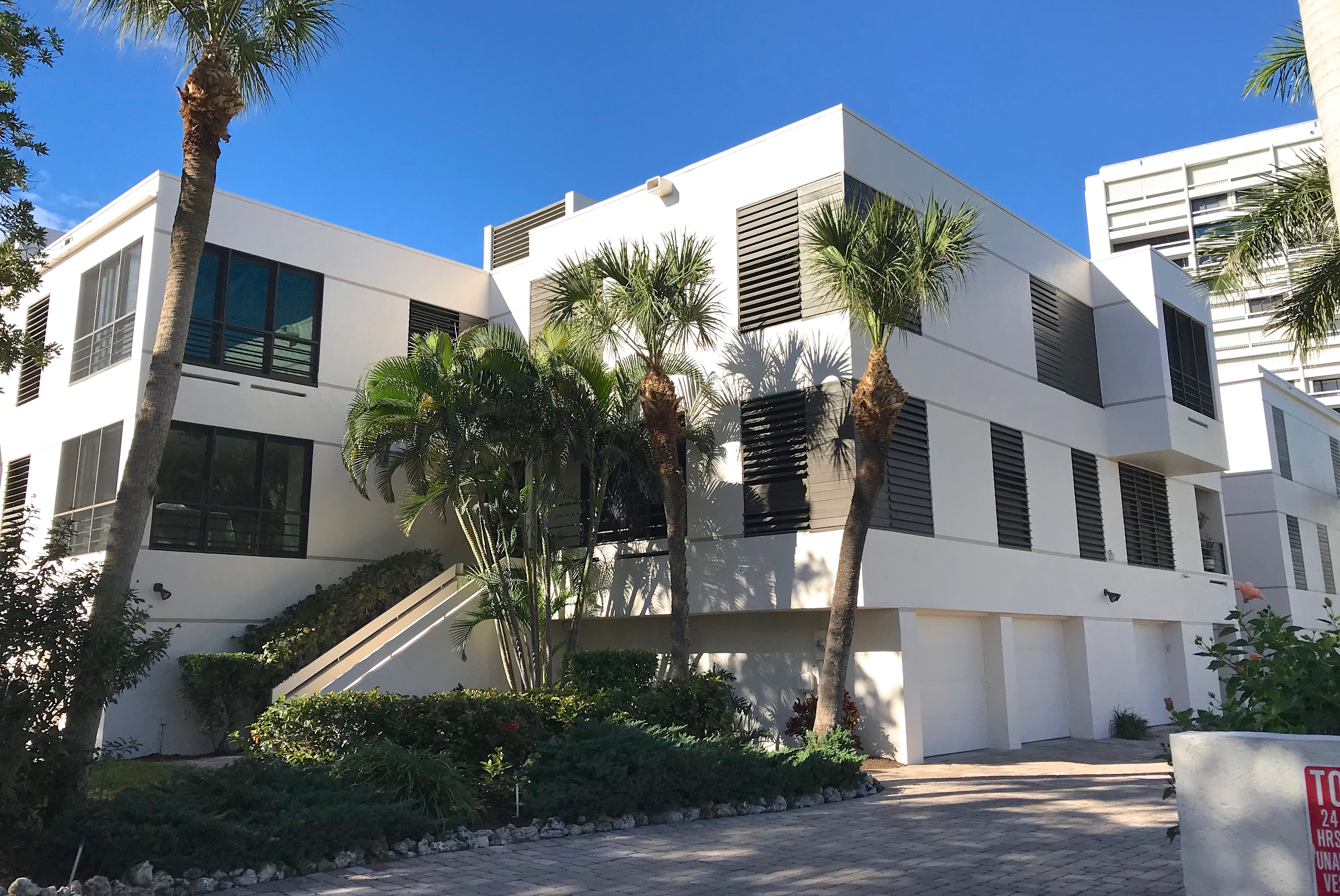
222 Beach Road Condominiums (Tim Seibert, Architect, FAIA)

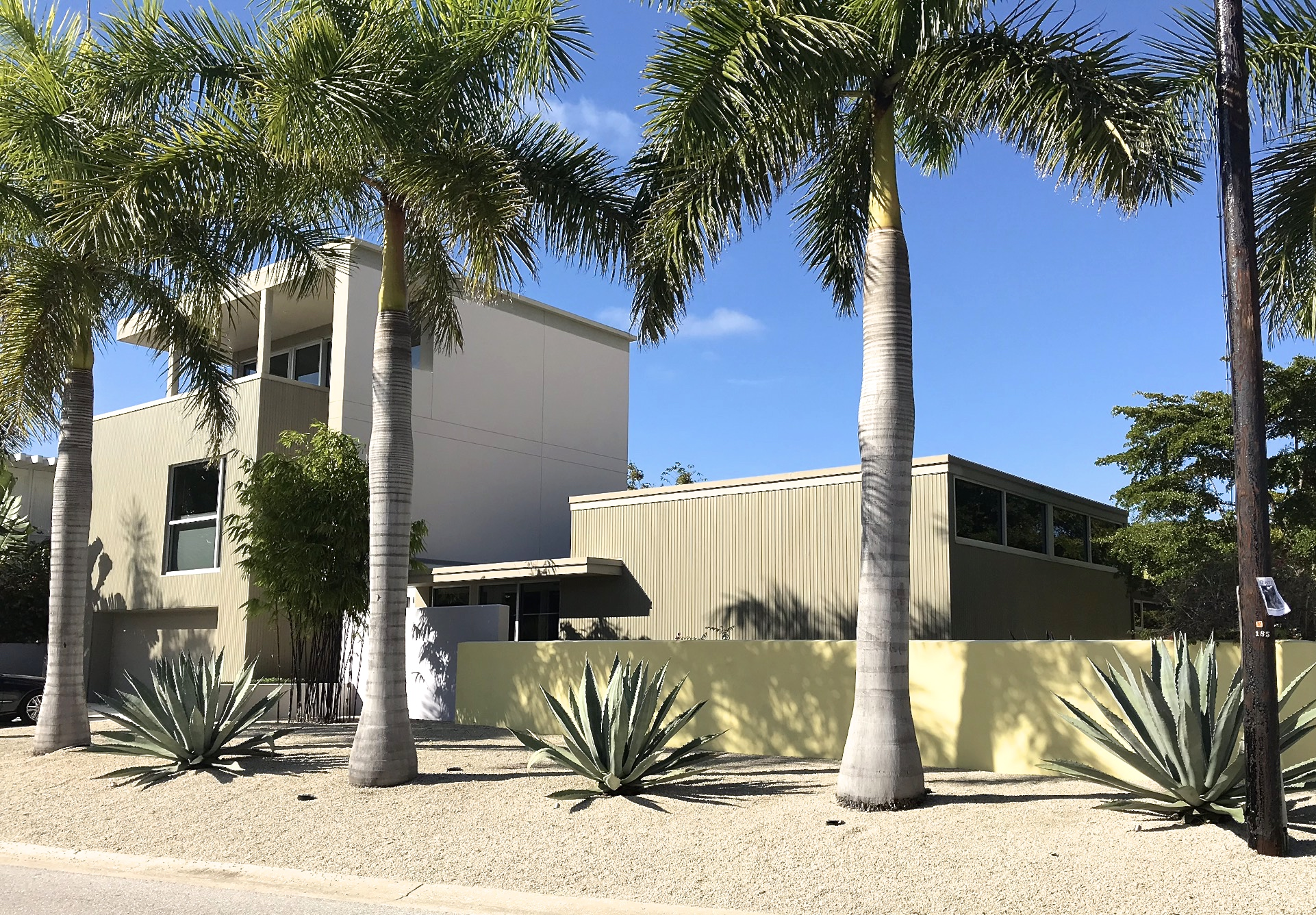
Craig Residence - Original structure, Tim Seibert. Restoration and addition, Guy Peterson.

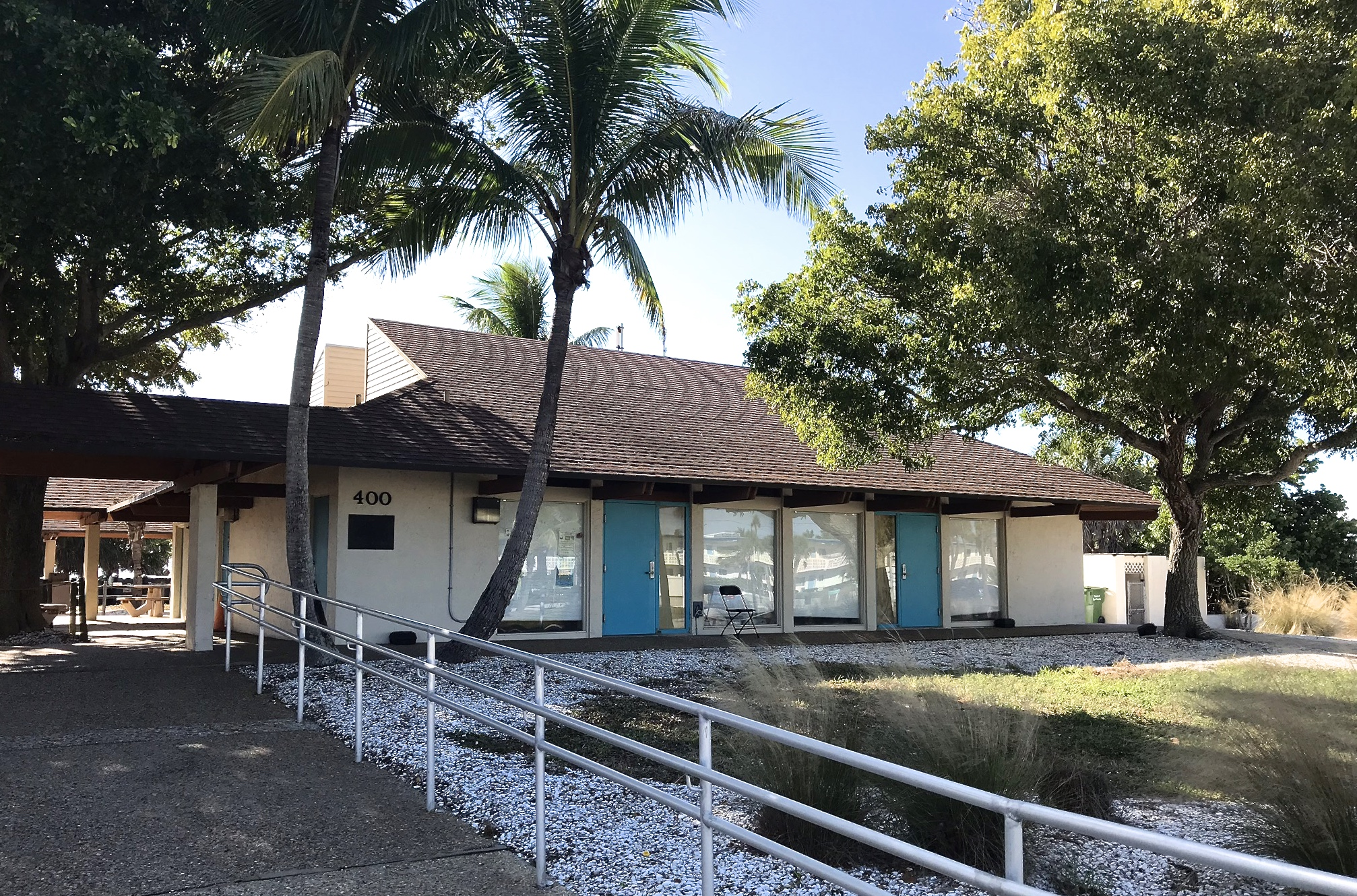
Lido Key Beach Pavilion (Tim Seibert, Architect, FAIA)

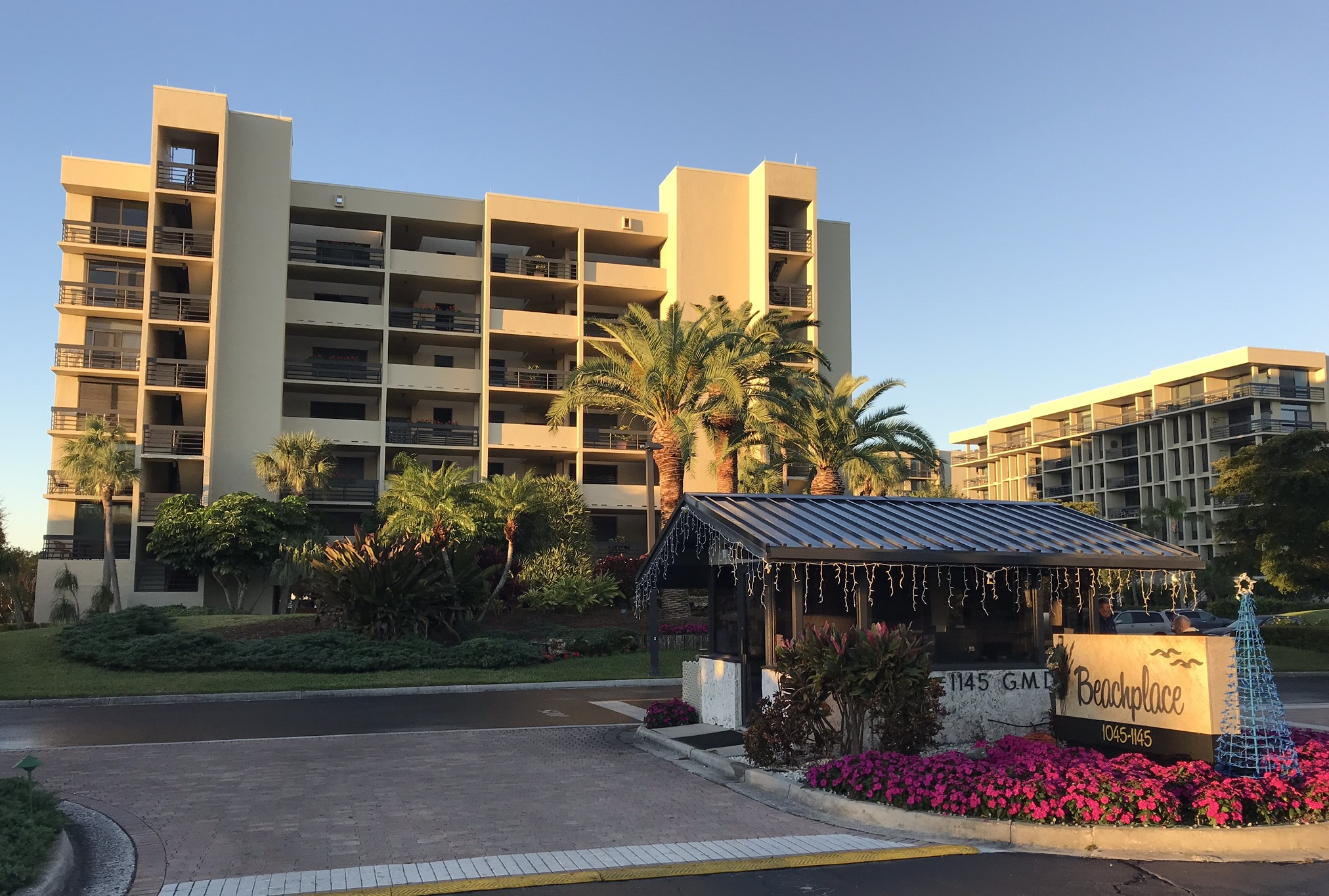
Beachplace (Tim Seibert, Architect, FAIA)

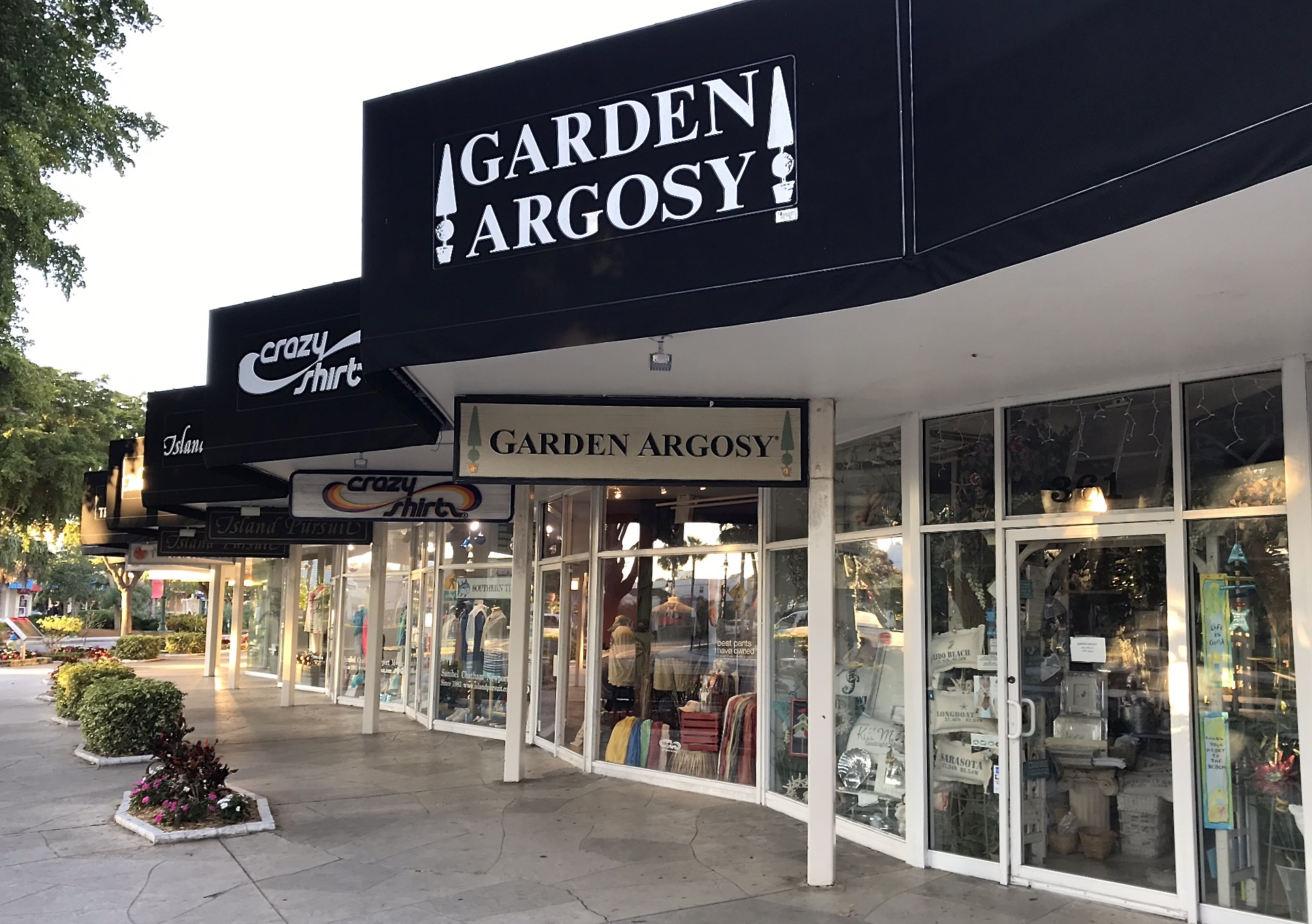
339-361 St. Armands Circle (Tim Seibert, Architect, FAIA)

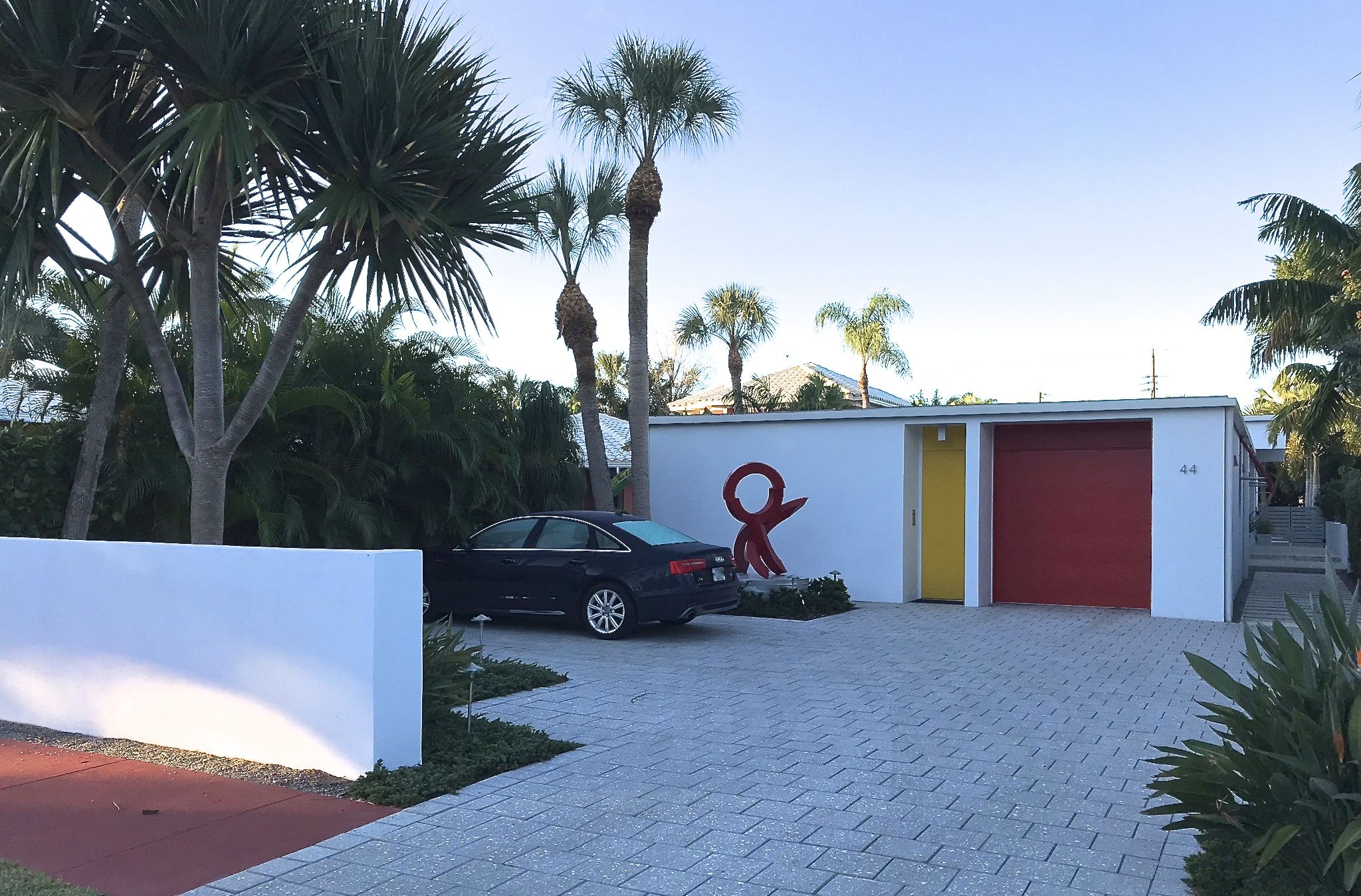
Cooney House (Tim Seibert, Architect FAIA)

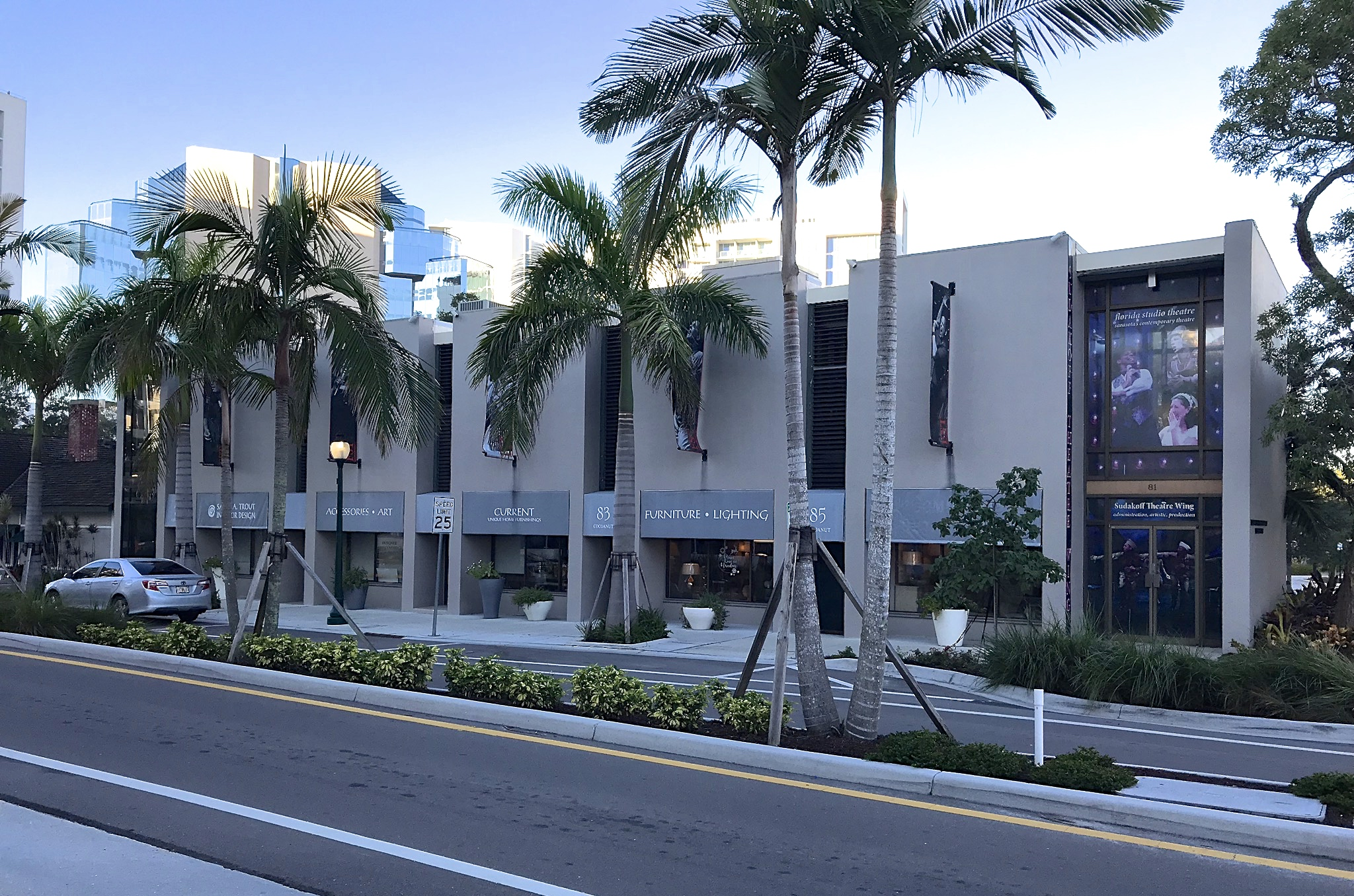
81 Cocoanut (Tim Seibert, Architect, FAIA)

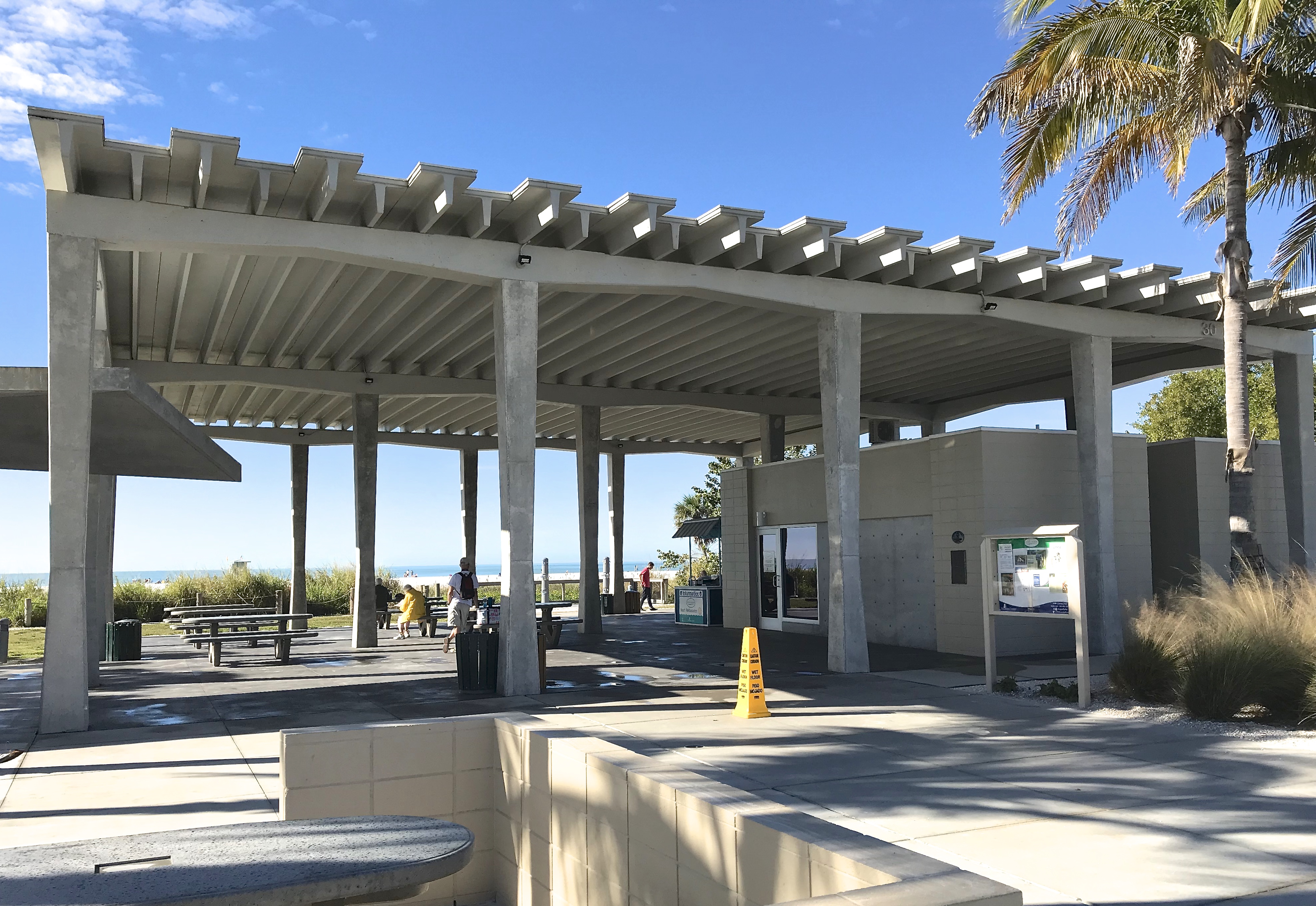
Siesta Key Beach Pavilion (Tim Seibert, Architect, FAIA)
