= Thomas Spiegelhalter =

German-American academic

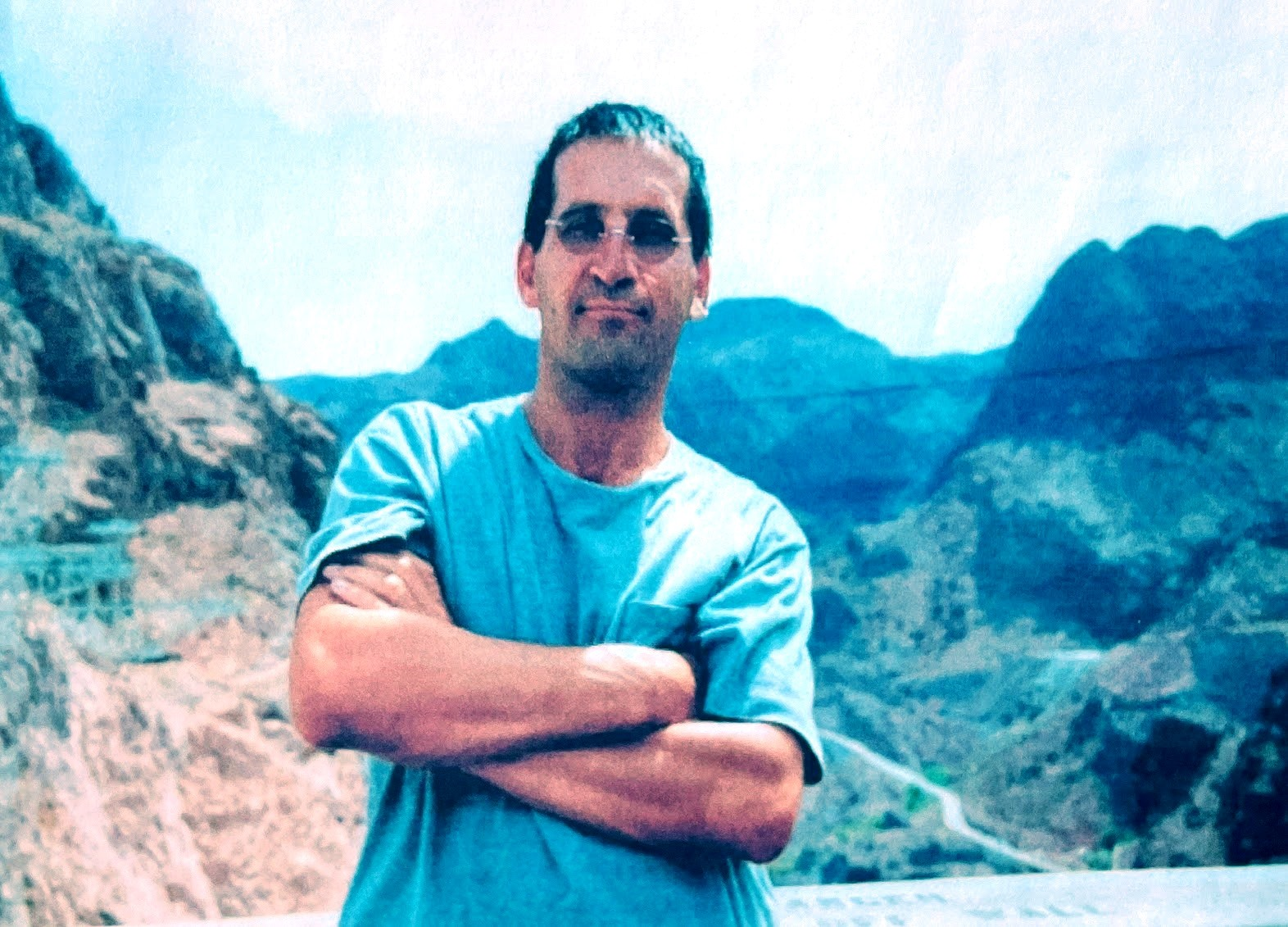
- Spiegelhalter at the Grand Canyon
- Citizenship: German-American
- Occupations: Architect and urban designer Academic

Academic background
- Education: PhD (Architecture); Master of Arts; Bachelor of Arts; Engineer's degree (Dipl-Ing.)
- Alma mater: Berlin University of the Arts; Università degli Studi di Genova
- Website: thomasspiegelhalter.com

Thomas Spiegelhalter is a German-American academic and architect.

== Early life and education ==
Born in Germany, Spiegelhalter earned his Engineer Degree (Dipl.-Ing.) from the University of Applied Sciences in Bremen. He also obtained both his Bachelor of Arts and Master of Arts degrees from the College of Architecture, Media and Design at the Berlin University of the Arts (UdK) in Germany. Additionally, he received his Ph.D in Generative AI-driven Architecture from the Università degli Studi di Genova (UniGe) in Italy.

== Career ==
From 1990 to 1991, Spiegelhalter served as an assistant professor at the University of Kaiserslautern in Germany, specializing in architecture, engineering, and town planning. Following this, in 1993, he became a Tenured Full C3-Professor at the University of Applied Science Leipzig, a position established by the Minister of the State Saxony's Ministry of Science and Culture.

In 1999, Spiegelhalter became a US-German-DAAD Visiting professor at the University of Houston's G. Hines College of Architecture. He later joined Carnegie Mellon University in Pittsburgh as a visiting professor at the Center for Building Performance and Diagnostics, Intelligent Workplace, a position he held from 2000 to 2003.

In 2000, Spiegelhalter was awarded a Tenured University C3-Professor at the University of Hannover in Germany, a designation from the Minister of the State Low-Saxony's department of Science and Culture.

From 2000 to 2002, Spiegelhalter was a guest professor at the Mundaneum, Universidad del Desino in San Jose, Costa Rica, focusing on sustainability and design, as well as sustainability and environmental systems.

From 2003 to 2009, Spiegelhalter served as a professor at the University of Southern California.

Among Spiegelhalter's 54 awards, honours and mentions are the AIV-Schinkel-Preis in Berlin in 1985, and the 2003 Design Vanguard Award from Architectural Record, recognizing their innovative approaches to shaping the built environment globally.

In 2006, Spiegelhalter took on the role of Cass Gilbert Visiting Professor for Innovations in Sustainable and Renewable Energy at the University of Minnesota in Minneapolis.

In 2009, Spiegelhalter joined Florida International University as a professor of architecture.

In 2017, he received the European Union's Erasmus Plus Grant for research in sustainability design as a visiting professor at the Università degli Studi di Genova in Italy. In the same year, Spiegelhalter co-established the Miami Dynamo-Rhynamo-BIM-360 group of the Intl. Autodesk User Groups (AUGI). Collaborating with universities internationally since 1990, Spiegelhalter has worked on various ecological engineering projects.

He took part in the Italian Pavilion in 2021, and subsequently, in 2023, he exhibited at the European Cultural Center during the Venice Architecture Biennale in Italy, showcasing his "Generative AI-Synbio Carbon-Positive, Blue-Green Infrastructure Projects."

From April 2023 to April 2024, he was awarded the Global Visiting Professor Grant at the Research Center for Climate Change Adaptation, Faculty of Environmental Information Studies, ECOGIS Lab, while serving as a doctoral supervisor with Wanglin Yan at Keio University's Shonan Fujisawa Campus in Tokyo, Japan.

In April 2024, he was appointed to the Fulbright Specialist International Awardee Roster for Architecture, with a designation to work with an Italian university for the tenure period of 2024-2027.

Spiegelhalter currently holds a position at Florida International University (FIU) as a tenured professor and the co-director of the Structures and Environmental Technologies Lab (SET). He also teaches subjects related to sustainability, carbon-positive design and green-blue urban systems at FIU and Miami Beach Urban Studios (MBUS).

Spiegelhalter is the founder of Thomas Spiegelhalter Studio + Associates and has been its head since 1990.

== Research work ==
Spiegelhalter's research work encompasses carbon-neutral designs, sustainable buildings, urban planning, and the rehabilitation of post-industrial environments, which includes engineered suspension and additive-manufactured, 3d printed bridges.

His work has been published in Contemporary European Architects, Volume V and Solar Architecture for Europe. In addition to these notable contributions, he has authored numerous research papers, monographs, journals, and books. Among his significant works are Gravel Pit Architecture (1990), Adaptable Technologies: Le Architetture di Thomas Spiegelhalter (2008), Best Practices in Sustainable Building Design (2013), Post-Parametric Automation in Design and Construction (2015), and Climate Responsive Architecture/Climate Change Adaptation and Resource Efficiency (2016). He is also the author of the CRUNCH DESIGN RESEARCH series, which includes Food, Water, Energy Nexus. Volume 1 - Urban Hybrids (2020), Volume 2 - Net-Zero High-Rises (2020), and Volume 3 - Carbon Positive 2020-2100 (2021). His most recent work, Analog to AI: Pioneering SynBio Nexus Design - Concepts, Tools, Workflows, Protocols, and Architectural Explorations, 1985-2100 (2024), explores future-focused architectural innovation.

== Events ==
On March 13, 1986, Spiegelhalter received the Intl. Schinkel Prize for Kunst und Bauen (Art and Building) by the Jury of AIV Berlin-Brandenburg awarding his Berlin Märkisches Viertel district masterplan redevelopment proposal. Following the Karl Friedrich Schinkel award ceremony, he was interviewed and broadcast on the German ZDF heute-journal television.

From June 19 to September 6, 1999, Spiegelhalter's Solar Architecture was exhibited as part of the US Traveling Exhibition Project "UNDER THE SUN - An outdoor exhibition of light." The exhibition events occurred at the Cooper Hewitt National Design Museum in Washington, D.C., and at the Cooper Hewitt Smithsonian Design Museum in Manhattan, New York. Spiegelhalter was joined by other contributors such as Thomas Herzog, BEAR Architekten/Tjerk Rejjenga/Gouda, Solar design Associates, Inc., Stephen Strong, Kiss+Cathart Architects, BP Solar Inc. Engineers, and Buero Happold.

Spiegelhalter was the keynote speaker at the Rice Design Alliance's "GREEN SPRING - TOWARDS AN ECOLOGICAL ARCHITECTURE Lecture Series 2001" at the Museum of Fine Arts, Houston on February 7, 2001. The event, hosted by the Rice Design Alliance at the Rice University School of Architecture in Houston, Texas, featured Spiegelhalter's address "UNDER THE SUN - WITH THE WIND," alongside keynotes and lectures by Ken Yeang, Fruto Vivas, and Pliny Fisk III.

He was a keynote speaker at the Institute for Architecture at TU Berlin at the 38th eCAADe Conference on September 16 and 17, 2020. He delivered "Disruptive AI Data-Driven, Carbon-Positive Bio-Inspired Optimization Design Workflows 2020-2100," highlighting innovative approaches to design optimisation.

At the Venice Architecture Biennale 2021, Spiegelhalter curated and moderated a panel discussion and FIU research video installation titled "Synthetic Biology for Carbon-Positive Architecture from 2021 to 2100" as part of the Italian Pavilion's exhibition on "Comunita Resilienti" by the 17th Venice Biennale curator Alessandro Melis. The panel featured Andrew Hessel, Pioneer in Synthetic Biology; Mitchell Joachim, Terreform ONE; and Rachel Armstrong, Living Architecture Systems at Newcastle University.

He served as a keynote speaker at the 2nd World Conference on Mechanical Engineering held in Amsterdam, The Netherlands, in June 2023. His presentation focused on "Exploring Challenges and Best Practices of Generative AI and Topological Design Optimizations in Mechanical, Industrial, Structural, and Architectural Fields."

In September 2023, he hosted a discussion at the College of Architecture at Florida International University on “AI in the Built Environment & Health” with Sir Prof. Dr. David Spiegelhalter. The event delved into the intersection of statistics, machine learning, and AI in architecture, design, and urban planning, offering attendees insights into future AI trends and impacts across disciplines.

On June 1, 2024, the CBS News TV network aired a segment on Spiegelhalter's research. The segment focused on his use of generative artificial intelligence with students to design bioinspired cities for the future in Miami. The designs included carbon-neutral scenario concepts for hurricane-resilient floating and stilt buildings and green-blue infrastructures, with projections extending to 2100.

Grande Calusa is a 23.5-acre mixed-use redevelopment project in Fort Myers, Florida, developed by Fort Myers Future LLC. The project aims to transform the Hurricane Ian-damaged Sanibel Outlets into a sustainable community resilient to hurricanes. It features residential, cultural, and commercial spaces, drawing inspiration from Calusa Indians heritage. Highlighted on NBC2 TV News on November 27, 2024, Grande Calusa seeks LEED, WELL, and ESG certifications to underscore its commitment to environmental stewardship.

In January 2025, Spiegelhalter presented his portfolio of award-winning designed, built, and researched architectural projects at the International ARCASIA Forum 22 in Colombo, Sri Lanka, under the theme “Polymathic Excellence: Crafting Narratives, Designing Tomorrows.” His presentation showcased AI-driven, large-scale infrastructural realizations and 3D-printed construction innovations, contributing to global dialogues on sustainable and resilient architecture
