= Philip Hanson Hiss III =

American real estate developer

Philip Hanson Hiss III (1910-1988) was an American real estate developer, who supervised the redesign of schools in Sarasota, Florida and helped found New College of Florida. Hiss was also a photographer and his collection is held at the University of California, Santa Barbara and the American Museum of Natural History.

== Background ==
Hiss was born on February 2, 1910, in Brooklyn, New York. His father was a professor of Bacteriology at Columbia University. He attended several prep schools, graduated from Choate, and then decided not to attend college, after inheriting a considerable fortune from the Low side of his family.

== Career ==
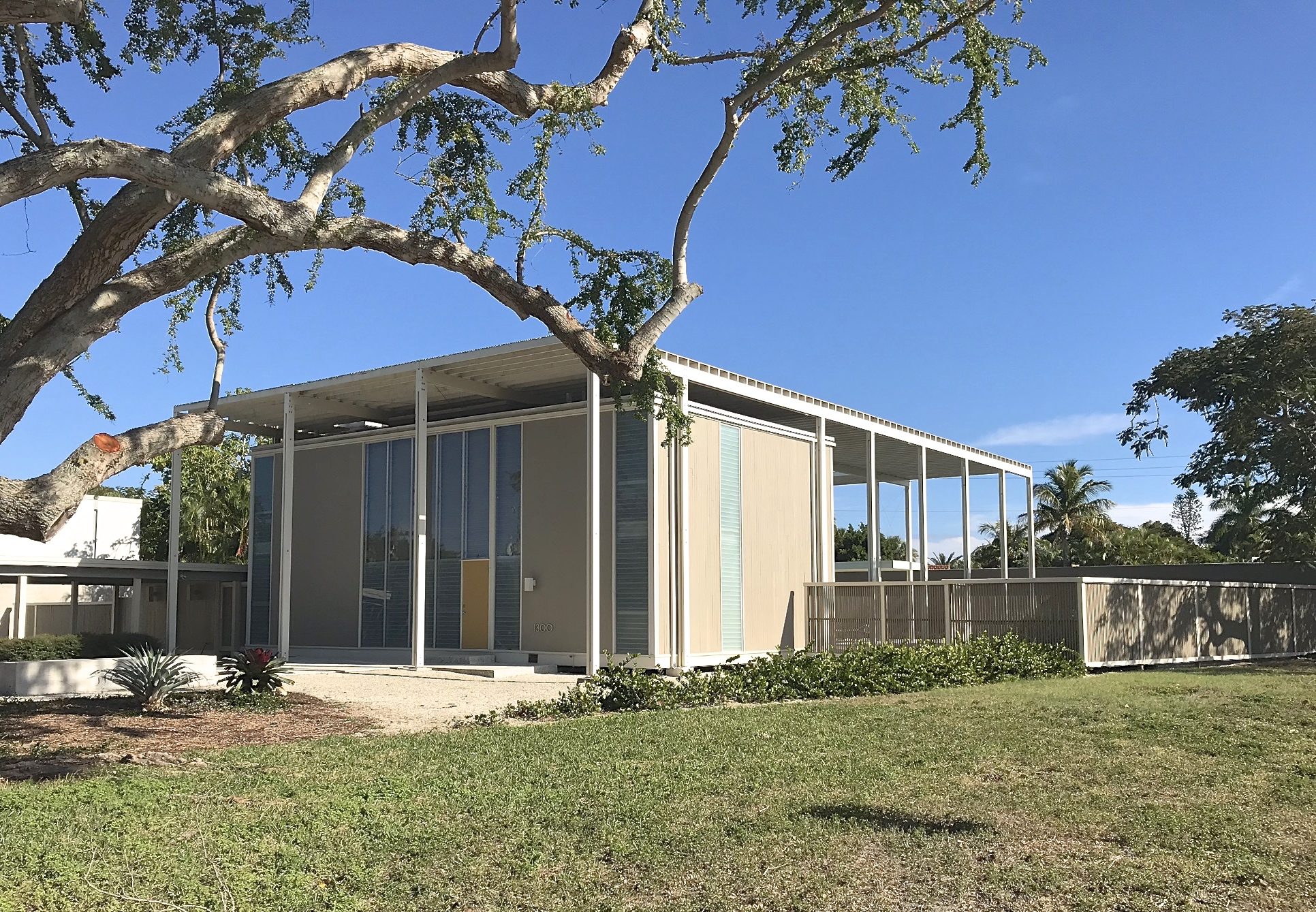
Hiss commissioned the Hiss Residence AKA "Umbrella House" to architect, Paul Rudolph.

Hiss traveled to Bali, where he met Margaret Mead.

During World War II, Hiss served as regional director of the United States Information Agency (then the Office of War Information) in the Netherlands. He was also a member of the Office of Strategic Services (precursor to the Central Intelligence Agency).

In 1948, Hiss had a 48-foot yacht built for himself and left New York City for Sarasota, Florida. There, he established Philip Hiss Associates, Inc., for real estate development. In 1952, he commissioned architects Paul Rudolph and Tim Seibert to build the Hiss Residence, also known as the "Umbrella House."

Although a Republican in a largely Democratic town, Hiss won a seat on the Sarasota Board of Public Instruction (school board) and between 1953 and 1960 oversaw the building of nine new schools in Sarasota. Hiss served as chairman and trustee of New College in Sarasota, Florida, founded with the help of the Sarasota Chamber of Commerce and the Congregational Church. He oversaw an architectural competition for New College's design, which went to architect I.M. Pei.

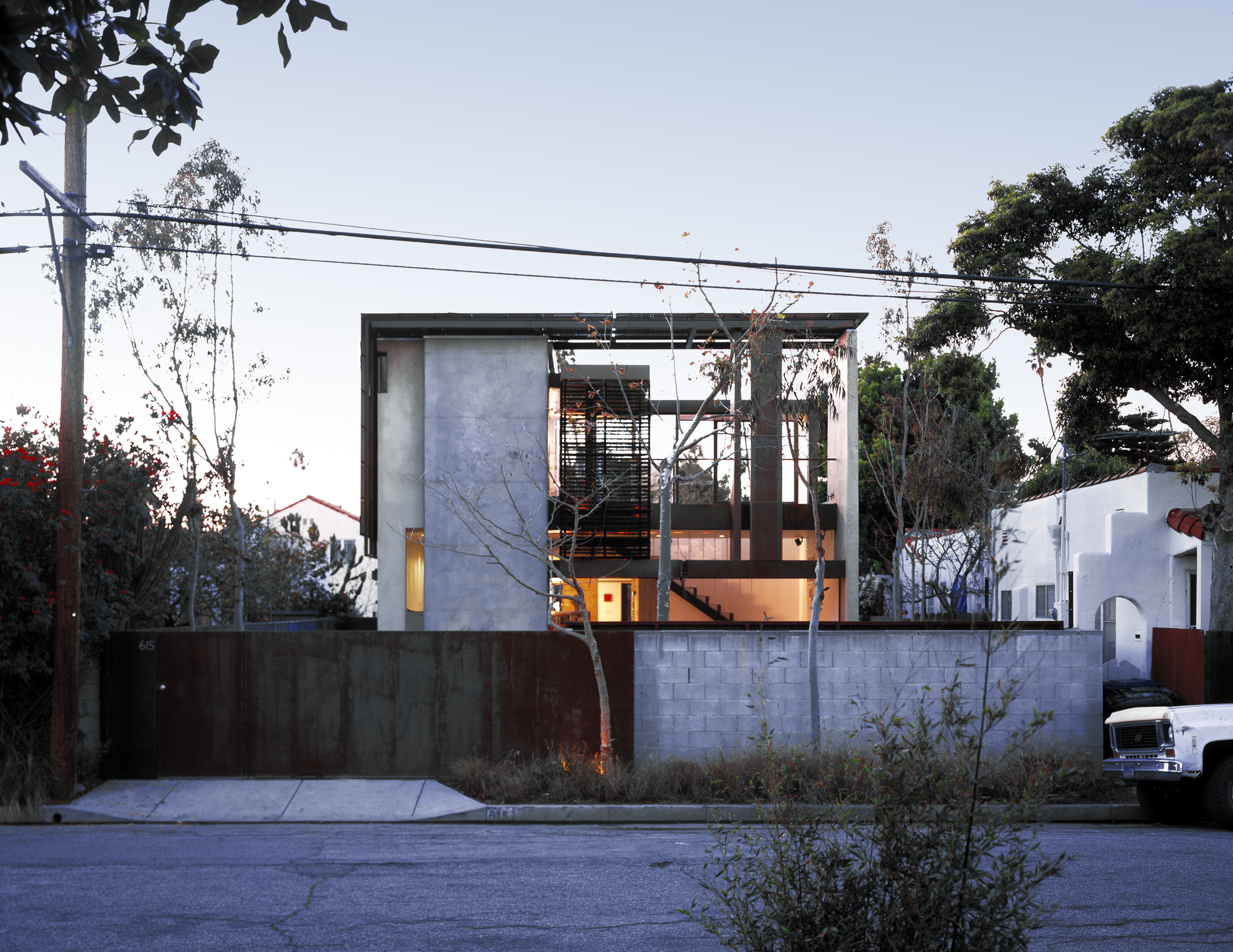
The Solar Umbrella house in Venice, California, drew from Paul Rudolph’s 1953 Hiss Residence (Umbrella House)

After a dispute with the board and having completed his second term, Hiss worked briefly for the Tampa Tribune newspapers and then left Sarasota, first for London, then to Carmel and finally Monterey, California.

== Personal details and death ==
Hiss married and divorced twice Diane Hiss, with whom he had two children. He married Shirley Holt, with whom he had three children.

Hiss was related distantly to Alger Hiss and closely to Seth Low, a mayor of New York City and president of Columbia University. His friends included architect Paul Rudolph.

Hiss died age 78 on October 24, 1988, in Monterey, California.

== Legacy ==
Since 2003, a photographic collection from Hiss resides in the archives of the University of California, Santa Barbara. The American Museum of Natural History also holds a photographic collection from Hiss.

In June 2021, SRQ magazine called Hiss "the primary catalyst of the modern architecture movement in Sarasota, as well as the Sarasota School of Architecture. On November 13, 2021, Architecture Sarasota inaugurated its first Philip Hanson Hiss Award, concurrent with an exhibit "The Vision of Philip Hiss" (November 2021-April 2022).

== Works ==
Hiss published two photographic histories, to which he contributed:

- Bali (1941)
- Netherlands America (1943)
- A Selective Guide to the English Literature on the Netherlands West Indies (1943)

== See also ==
- New College of Florida
- Hiss Residence ("Umbrella House")
- Hiss and Weekes
- Alger Hiss
- Seth Low
