= Andrew Hessel =

American geneticist

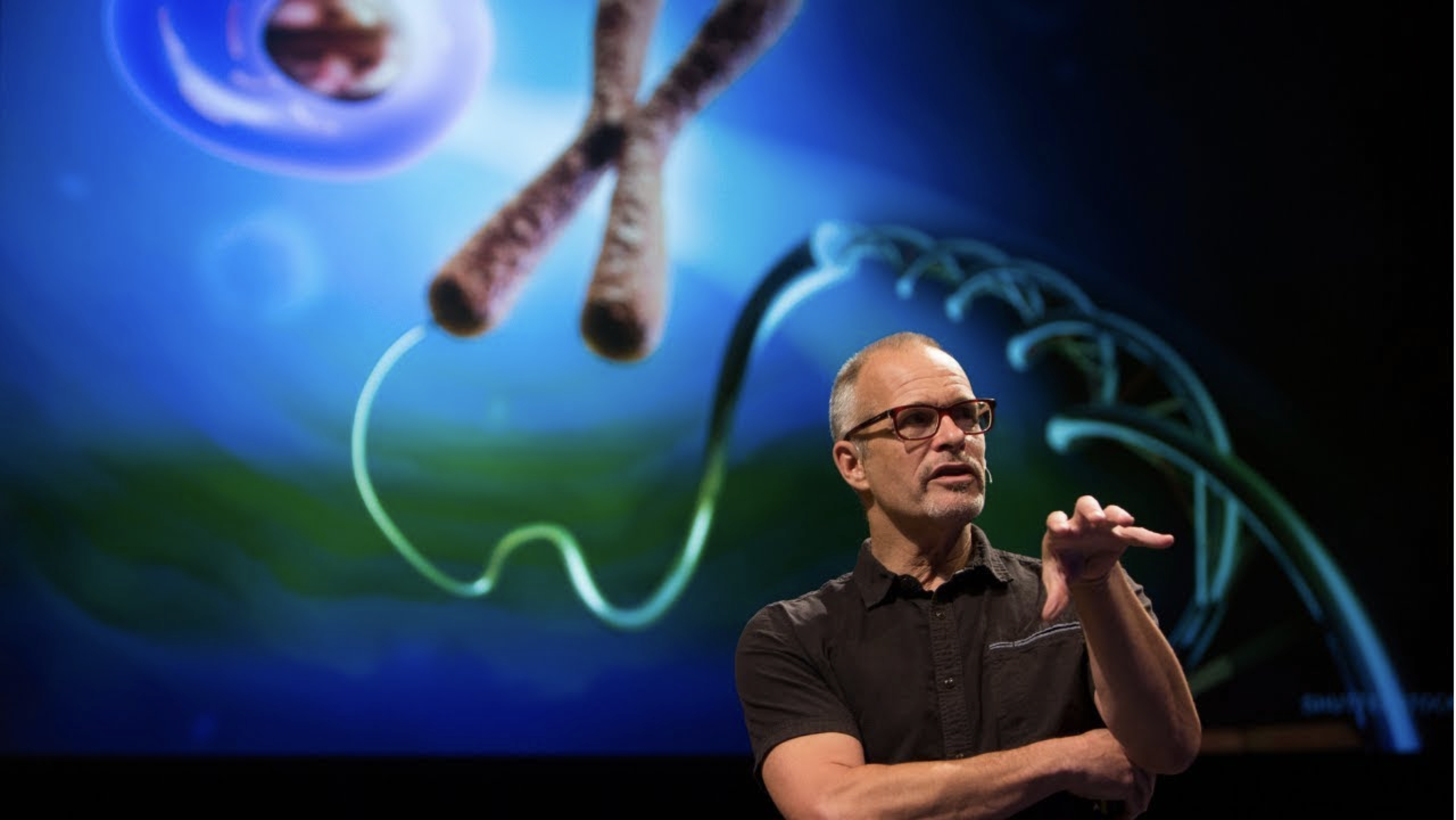
Hessel at the BIF Conference in 2018

Andrew Hessel is a pioneer in synthetic biology, a futurist, microbiologist and geneticist, and inventor and entrepreneur. He is a proponent of open source biology and advocates that cells are living computers and DNA is a programming language. He has been advocating for writing DNA since shortly after the original Human Genome Project, and co-founded the Genome Project-write. Hessel is an expert in biological technologies and biosecurity, helping industry, academics, and authorities better understand the rapid changes in life science.

== Life and education ==
Andrew Hessel was born in Canada and currently resides in the United States. He received a M.Sc. in biology from University of Calgary in 1995.

== Career and entrepreneurship ==
Andrew Hessel is a serial entrepreneur. In 2002, he co-founded Miikana Therapeutics, a clinical-stage drug development company. In 2009 he founded Pink Army Cooperative, the world's first cooperative biotechnology company, which aimed to make open source viral therapies for cancer. Hessel is founding faculty and former co-chair of Bioinformatics and Biotechnology at Singularity University where he worked to develop the Life Sciences track. From 2012 to 2018, Hessel was a Distinguished Researcher in the Bio/Nano Programmable Matter department at Autodesk. Hessel then co-founded the Genome Project-write in 2016, where he is currently chairman of the board and co-executive director. In 2017, Hessel co-founded Humane Genomics, Inc., which uses synthetic virus engineering to target cancer cells.

He previously worked at the Amgen Institute and he was a fellow at the Institute for Science, Society, and Policy at the University of Ottawa.

=== Genome Project-write (GPW) ===
Hessel is a long time proponent of writing DNA and was the catalyst behind the Genome Project-write (GPW). In 2012, he published an article about the next Human Genome Project. It gained little traction. Three years later in 2015 at the fourth Sc2.0 Conference, a meeting of scientists working on the yeast genome led by Jef Boeke, Nancy J. Kelley posed the question, “Well, what’s the next grand challenge for this community?” Hessel replied “Well, there’s only one grand challenge in synthetic biology to my mind, and that is to synthesize a human genome." Hessel then approached geneticist George Church at Harvard and asked him to lead the project. Together, Hessel, Church, Kelley and Boeke co-founded the Genome Project-write in 2016. Autodesk provided the seed funding to launch the Genome Project-write.

The project launched to controversy over its perceived secrecy. The founders were forbidden to discuss the project openly with the press due to an embargo by Science magazine, which had delayed its publication of their foundational papers until after the scheduled meeting. The project also encountered mixed response within the synthetic biology and scientific community.

== Work ==
Hessel was an early supporter of, ambassador to, and judge at the international Genetically Engineered Machines iGEM competitions at MIT, helping it grow in its early stages.

While at Autodesk, Hessel, along with Paul Jaschke and Jacqueline Quinn, designed and synthesized φX174 in under three weeks and for approximately US$1000 using digital tools. It exemplified the rapid advancement of tools in synthetic biology. Paola Antonelli, the director of R&D at the Museum of Modern Art in NYC acquired the symbolic 3D printed plastic virus of φX174 as the first engineered organism in MoMA's collection.

In 2015, Hessel became a AAAS-Lemelson Invention Ambassador after being nominated by his friend and renowned mycologist, Paul Stamets, who had been in the inaugural class of Invention Ambassadors. The program inspired Hessel to approach George Church to co-found the Genome Project-write.

In February 2022, Hessel's book, The Genesis Machine: Our Quest to Rewrite Life in the Age of Synthetic Biology with futurist Amy Webb was published by PublicAffairs/Hachette Book Group. It was a New Yorker Best Book of 2022.

Hessel regularly speaks to private and public audiences on biotechnology and biodefense topics for groups such as EY, CERN, Stanford, the FBI, the United Nations, ISHI, Singularity University, Forbes, and TEDx. He has been listed as a participant or member of think tanks and organizations such as the Berggruen Institute, Geneva Science and Diplomacy Anticipator (GESDA), and the Long Now Foundation.

== Ideas ==
Hessel has publicly shared other futurist ideas about life underground, human cloning and biobanking.
