= Emily LeProust =

American scientist and entrepreneur

Emily Leproust is an American scientist and entrepreneur. She is the CEO and co-founder of Twist Bioscience, a public company working on DNA synthesis. The company harnesses synthetic biology, providing tools to manufacture insulin from yeast, to tackle malaria, produce spider silk at scale or store information on DNA. She was awarded the BIO Rosalind Franklin Award in 2020.

== Education and career ==
Leproust earned an M.Sc. in Industrial Chemistry from the Lyon School of Industrial Chemistry in 1995 and a PhD in Organic Chemistry & Nucleic Acids Chemistry from the University of Houston in 2001. She worked for the company Agilent where she was Director of Applications and Chemistry R&D—Genomics before starting the company Twist Bioscience.

Leproust participated in a March 2021 tabletop exercise at the Munich Security Conference simulating an outbreak of weaponized monkeypox.

== Allegations of fraud and class action lawsuit ==
On February 6, 2020, Twist Bioscience agreed to pay $22.5 million in settlement with Agilent. "Agilent sued Twist in 2016, alleging that Twist CEO and cofounder Emily Leproust stole trade secrets when she left Agilent to launch the provider of custom DNA products and services."

A class action case alleging fraud against Leproust and her company is pending. "Plaintiffs allege that from December 13, 2019 through November 14, 2022, Twist and its senior management misrepresented that the company possessed innovative proprietary technology to produce synthetic DNA at a higher quality and lower cost than competitors, positioning Twist for significant future growth. Plaintiffs further allege that defendants engaged in accounting improprieties to conceal the scheme."

On November 15, 2022, Scorpion Capital issued a short-seller report alleging serious fraud at Leproust's company, Twist Bioscience. The company called the report "misleading" and "inaccurate".

== Publications ==
- Gnirke A, Melnikov A, Maguire J, Rogov P, LeProust EM, Brockman W, Fennell T, Giannoukos G, Fisher S, Russ C, Gabriel S. Solution hybrid selection with ultra-long oligonucleotides for massively parallel targeted sequencing. Nature biotechnology. 2009 Feb;27(2):182-9.
- Kaplan N, Moore IK, Fondufe-Mittendorf Y, Gossett AJ, Tillo D, Field Y, LeProust EM, Hughes TR, Lieb JD, Widom J, Segal E. The DNA-encoded nucleosome organization of a eukaryotic genome. Nature. 2009 Mar;458(7236):362-6.
- Goldman N, Bertone P, Chen S, Dessimoz C, LeProust EM, Sipos B, Birney E. Towards practical, high-capacity, low-maintenance information storage in synthesized DNA. Nature. 2013 Feb;494(7435):77-80.
