= Twist Bioscience =

American Biotechnology company

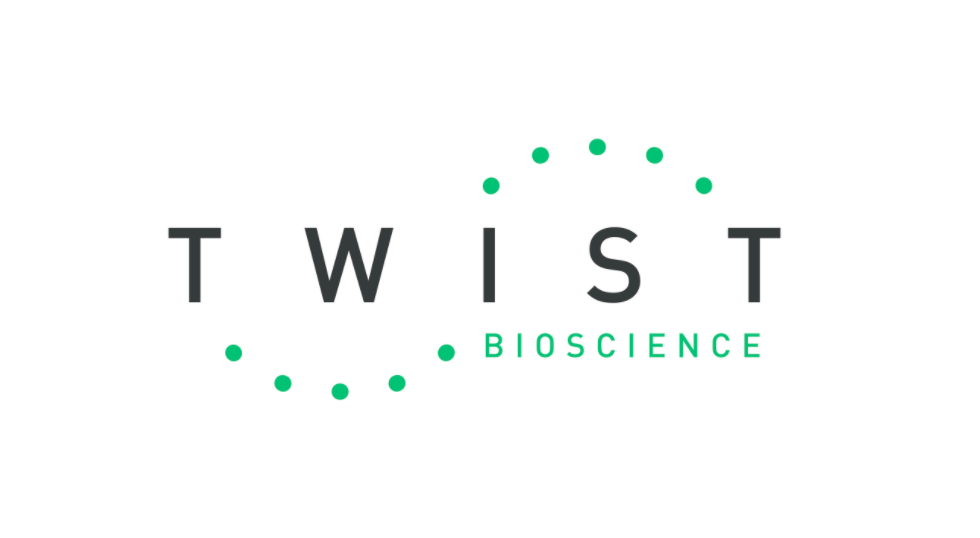
- Type: Public
- Traded as: Nasdaq: TWST; Russell 2000 component
- Industry: synthetic biology
- Founded: 2013; 13 years ago
- Founders: Emily Leproust; Bill Banyai; Bill Peck
- Headquarters: South San Francisco, California
- Products: Genes and gene fragments, NGS products
- Revenue: ▲US$459.4 million (2026)
- Net income: ▼US$−130.2 million (2026)
- Number of employees: 400
- Website: twistbioscience.com

Twist Bioscience is a public biotechnology company based in South San Francisco that manufactures synthetic DNA and DNA products for customers in a wide range of industries. Twist was founded in 2013 by Emily Leproust, Bill Banyai, and Bill Peck.

The company was represented by Leproust at a March 2021 tabletop exercise at the Munich Security Conference simulating an outbreak of weaponized monkeypox.

In May 2021, Twist Bioscience and Genome Project-Write launched a new CAD platform for whole genome design. The CAD will automate workflows to enable collaborative efforts critical for scale-up from designing plasmids to megabases across entire genomes.
