= Peter Tolkin Architecture =

Architectural firm based in Los Angeles, California

Practice information
- Key architects: Peter Tolkin Sarah Lorenzen
- Founded: 1998
- Location: Los Angeles, CA

Significant works and honors
- Buildings: Saladang Song Restaurant, Sunglass House in Malibu, Sherman Residence in Sherman Oaks, Branch House in Montecito

Peter Tolkin Architecture is an architectural firm based in Los Angeles, California, established in 1998.

== Overview ==
The practice's early work focused on the revitalization and redevelopment of buildings in Old Town Pasadena. In several adaptive reuse projects and work in other cities with downtown revitalization plans, such as Santa Monica and Long Beach.

The firm has completed several larger projects.

== Awards ==
- Saladang Song was a finalist for the James Beard Foundation restaurant design awards, and it received a merit award from the Los Angeles AIA and an Honor award from the Pasadena & Foothill chapters of the American Institute of Architects.
- 2002 Peter Tolkin featured in Architectural Record as one of ten “vanguard” international firms.
