= Architectural Record =

American monthly trade magazine

- Cover of August 2025 issue
- Editor in chief: Josephine Minutillo
- Categories: Trade magazine
- Frequency: Monthly
- Total circulation: 93,469 (June 2018)
- Founded: 1891
- Company: BNP Media
- Country: United States
- Based in: New York City
- Language: English
- Website: architecturalrecord.com
- ISSN: 0003-858X

Architectural Record is a US-based monthly magazine dedicated to architecture and interior design. Its editor in chief is Josephine Minutillo. The Record, as it is sometimes colloquially referred to, is widely-recognized as an important historical record of the unfolding debates in architectural practice, history and criticism in the 20th-century United States. The magazine is currently published by BNP Media. Throughout its 133 years in print, Architectural Record has engaged readership among architecture, engineering, and design professionals through articles showcasing noteworthy architectural projects around the world. News, commentary, criticism, and continuing-education sections outline the scope of content. Of note are the glossy, high-quality photos of featured projects, which give the magazine wider readership outside of just those working in the design professions.

== Organization and history ==
Architectural Record began publication in 1891 by Clinton W. Sweet, who also published the Real Estate Record and Builders' Guide. Sweet and Frederick Warren Dodge soon formed a partnership. Dodge published an information service for builders and architects, originally in Boston and expanded to New York with the partnership. Together they established Sweet's Indexed Catalogue of Building Construction, a publication intended to be a summary filing of manufacturer's catalogs.

In March 1938, the periodical American Architect and Architecture, first published in 1876, was merged with Architectural Record. This combined the two oldest architectural magazines in the United States.

Sweet's Catalog and Architectural Record became part of F. W. Dodge Corporation in 1912. McGraw Hill acquired F. W. Dodge in 1961. McGraw-Hill divested the subsidiary McGraw-Hill Construction to Symphony Technology Group for US$320 million on September 22, 2014. The sale included Engineering News-Record, Architectural Record, Dodge and Sweet's. McGraw-Hill Construction has been renamed Dodge Data & Analytics. On July 1, 2015, the magazine was sold to BNP Media, along with Engineering News-Record and SNAP (a bi-monthly print product associated with Sweet’s).

Architectural Record once held a close relationship with the American Institute of Architects (AIA), serving as its magazine of record. This relationship continues through programs such as AIA Continuing Education sections offered in the magazine and its website. A previous editor-in-chief of the magazine, Robert Ivy, was a long-term CEO of the AIA.

The editorial offices are located at the Empire State Building in Manhattan.

== Record Houses ==
Record Houses is an annual awards program organized by Architectural Record. Winning projects are selected by an editorial jury and published in the magazine. Preference is given to "projects that incorporate innovation in program, building technology, materials, and form."

== Design Vanguard ==
Started in 2000, Design Vanguard is an annual feature whereby Architectural Record features emerging practices from around the world "that are demonstrating inventive approaches to shaping the built environment." Notable firms that have been recognized as a Design Vanguard include Andres Jaque, Vo Trong Nghia Architects, Bjarke Ingels Group, nARCHITECTS, Tatiana Bilbao, Sou Fujimoto, Höweler+Yoon, Office Kersten Geers David Van Severen, LTL Architects, mos, Smiljan Radic, Evan Douglis, Michel Rojkind, Neri & Hu, Jeanne Gang, Peter Tolkin Architecture, Synthesis Design + Architecture, Thomas Spiegelhalter, Oyler Wu Collaborative, SsD, IwamotoScott, Abruzzo Bodziak Architects, Merge Architects, Uufie, and WORKac.

== Women in Architecture ==
In 2014, Architectural Record initiated their "Women in Architecture Forum and Awards" program, "as a way to spotlight pioneering women pushing the boundaries of innovation and creativity in design." Each year's five honorees are categorized as Design Leader, New Generation Leader, Innovator, Activist, and Educator.

== The Wild Men of Paris ==
Leading up to 1910, Gelett Burgess interviewed and wrote about avant-garde artists and artworks in and around Paris. The result of Burgess' investigation, "The Wild Men of Paris", was published in the May 1910 issue of Architectural Record; after his visit to the 1910 Salon des Indépendants, the anti-establishment art exhibition in Paris one year before the scandalous group exhibition that brought Cubism to the attention of the general public. An important painting by Pablo Picasso, Les Demoiselles d'Avignon, was reproduced in this article; one of the first mentions of the founders of Cubism, Pablo Picasso, Georges Braque, and Jean Metzinger to appear in the American press. Other important works were reproduced by Henri Matisse, Auguste Herbin, and André Derain.
