= Evan Douglis =

American architect

Evan Douglis is an American architect, scholar, and Dean of the Rensselaer School of Architecture at the Rensselaer Polytechnic Institute in Troy, New York. Prior to his appointment as Dean of the School of Architecture he served as chair of the undergraduate program at Pratt Institute, an associate professor and the director of the architecture galleries at the Columbia Graduate School of Architecture, Planning and Preservation at Columbia University, and a visiting instructor at The Irwin S. Chanin School of Architecture at the Cooper Union. He received a Bachelor of Architecture from Cooper Union and a Master of Architecture from the Graduate School of Design at Harvard University.

He is principal of Evan Douglis Studio, an architecture and interdisciplinary design firm.
