= Genome Project–Write =

Research project to synthesise the human genome

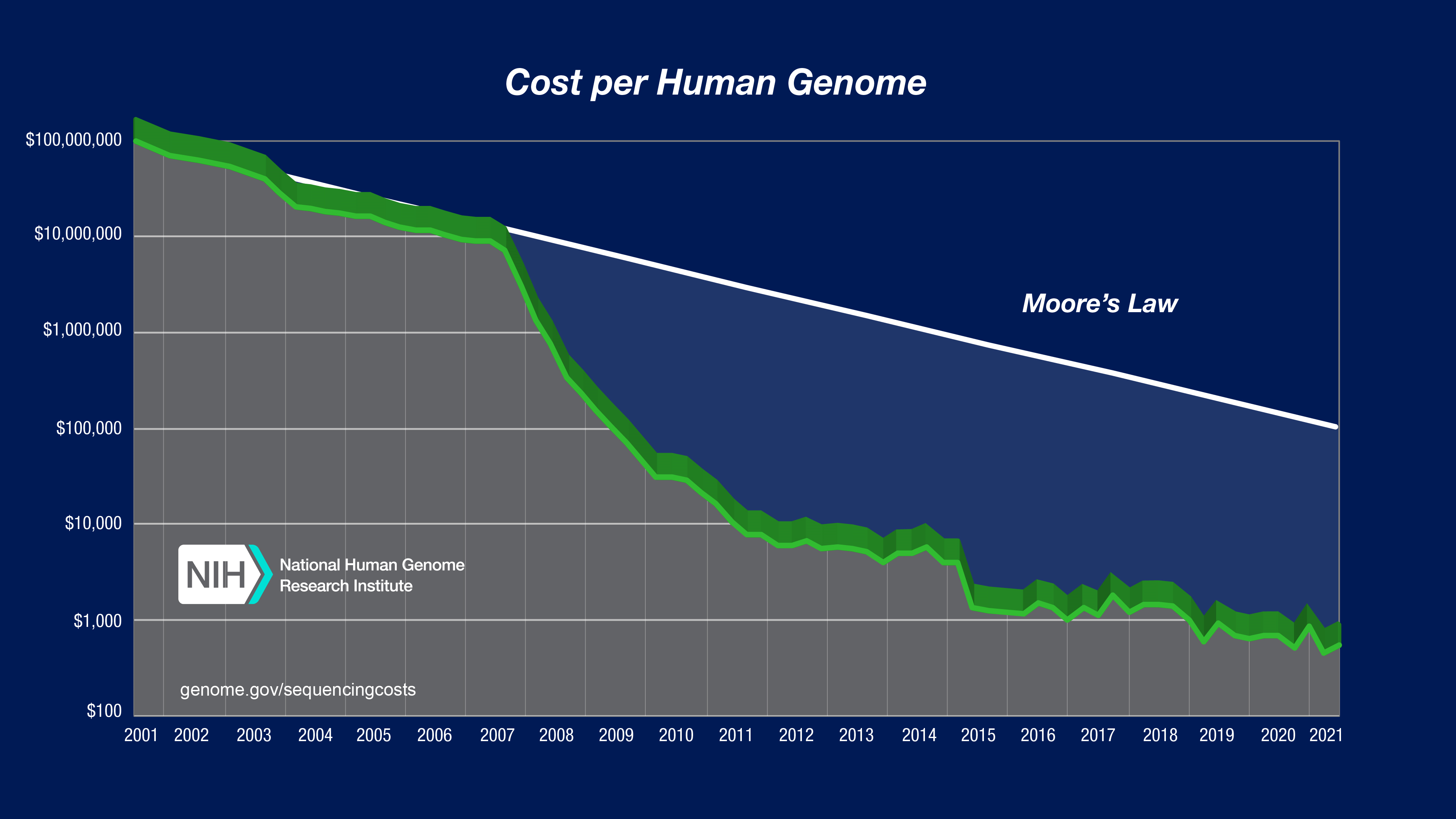
Since the Human Genome Project first sequenced the human genome from 1987 to 2004 at a cost of US$3 billion, costs have fallen precipitously, outpacing even Moore's law, and were ≈US$1,000 in 2015. More widely available genome sequencing has led to more data on variants of uncertain significance.

The Genome Project–Write (also known as GP-Write) is a large-scale collaborative research project (an extension of Genome Projects, aimed at reading genomes since 1984) that focuses on the development of technologies for the synthesis and testing of genomes of many different species of microbes, plants, and animals, including the human genome in a sub-project known as Human Genome Project–Write (HGP-Write). Formally announced on 2 June 2016, the project leverages two decades of work on synthetic biology and artificial gene synthesis.

The newly created GP-Write project will be managed by the Center of Excellence for Engineering Biology, an American nonprofit organization. Researchers expect that the ability to artificially synthesize large portions of many genomes will result in many scientific and medical advances.

== Science and development ==
In May 2021, GP-Write and Twist Bioscience launched a new CAD platform for whole genome design. The GP-Write CAD will automate workflows to enable collaborative efforts critical for scale-up from designing plasmids to megabases across entire genomes.

== Microbial Genome Projects–Write ==
Technologies for constructing and testing yeast artificial chromosomes (YACs), synthetic yeast genomes (Sc2.0), and virus/phage-resistant bacterial genomes have industrial, agricultural, and medical applications.

== Human Genome Project–Write ==
A complete haploid copy of the human genome consists of at least three billion DNA nucleotide base pairs, which have been described in the Human Genome Project - Read program (95% completed as of 2004). Among the many goals of GP-Write are the making of cell lines resistant to all viruses and synthesis assembly lines to test variants of unknown significance that arise in research and diagnostic sequencing of human genomes (which has been exponentially improving in cost, quality, and interpretation).

== See also ==
- BRAIN Initiative
- ENCODE
- EuroPhysiome
- Genome Compiler
- HUGO Gene Nomenclature Committee
- Human Cytome Project
- Human Microbiome Project
- Human Proteome Project
- Human Protein Atlas
- Human Variome Project
- List of biological databases
- Personal Genome Project
