= Carl Abbott =

American architect (1936–2026)

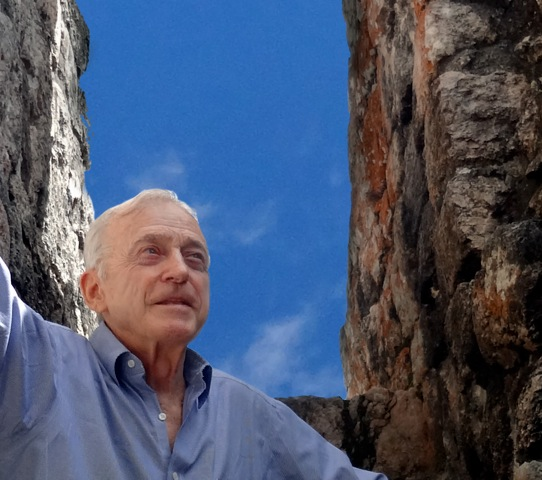
- Abbott in 2016
- Born: March 31, 1936; Darien, Georgia, U.S.
- Died: October 7, 2026 (aged 90); Sarasota, Florida, U.S.
- Education: University of Florida (B.Arch.); Yale University (M.Arch.)
- Occupation: Architect
- Website: carlabbott.com

J. Carl Abbott (March 31, 1936 – October 7, 2026) was an American architect. He was a fellow of the American Institute of Architects and the youngest and last surviving member of the original Sarasota School of Architecture.

== Life and career ==
J. Carl Abbott was born in Darien, Georgia, on March 31, 1936. After receiving his bachelor's degree from the University of Florida, Abbott earned his master's degree at Yale University, studying under the prominent architect Paul Rudolph. After graduating from Yale, Abbott worked with Richard Rogers and Norman Foster at TEAM 4 in London, then worked in the office of I. M. Pei in New York City before founding his own practice in Sarasota, Florida, in 1966.

In his own practice, Abbott's first design was the Weld Beach House in Boca Grande. This design established his exploration of geometry and sculptural forms within a clear concept responding directly to the site. This project began Abbott's wide recognition in Floridian and national architectural press.

Abbott's award-winning body of projects include the Casa del Cielo, Lido Bayfront House, Putterman-Levine Residence/House of Terraces, Artist's Family Compound, Caribbean Hilltop Residence, Saint Thomas More Catholic Church, among many others. Abbott had the highest number of Test of Time Awards given in the Florida/Caribbean Region for “Designs of Enduring Significance”.

In addition to his architectural practice, Abbott was also a speaker on the architecture of past civilizations, most notably the Maya, where he worked extensively to document and uncover the significant spatial mastery of the ancient culture.

In the book IN/FORMED by THE LAND, architecture critic Michael Sorkin wrote of Abbott's work, “Project after project delivers on the modernist ideal of eliding inside and out creating the illusion of the natural flowing untrammeled through the constructed…a sequence of shifts both tactile and tectonic that create a richly compact journey in which spaces move to arrive at moments of expansiveness and relaxation both.”

His classmate from Yale Richard Rogers said of Abbott's work, “His buildings are sensitive to context, express a spare poetry without ever becoming austere, and have a unique beauty…the result is buildings that are works of art.”

He was the focus of the Sarasota Architectural Foundation's 2020 SarasotaMOD Weekend.

Abbott died in Sarasota on October 7, 2026, at the age of 90.

== Gallery ==
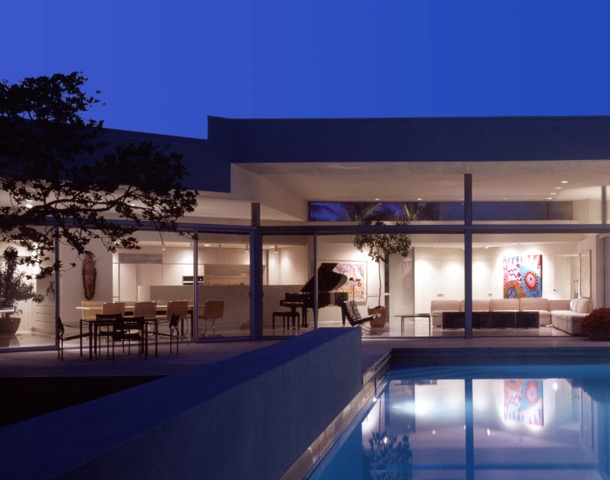
Putterman-Levine Residence/House of Terraces (1986, renovated 2023)

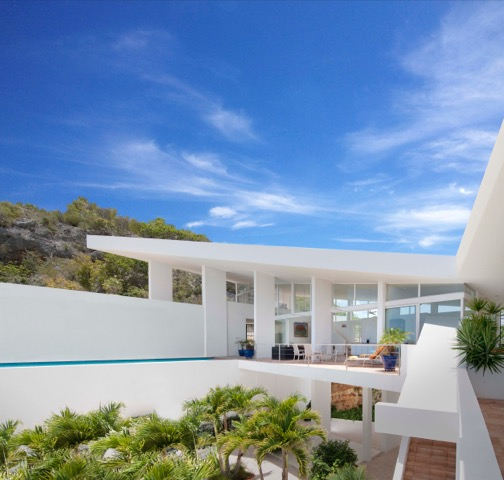
Caribbean Hilltop House (2008)

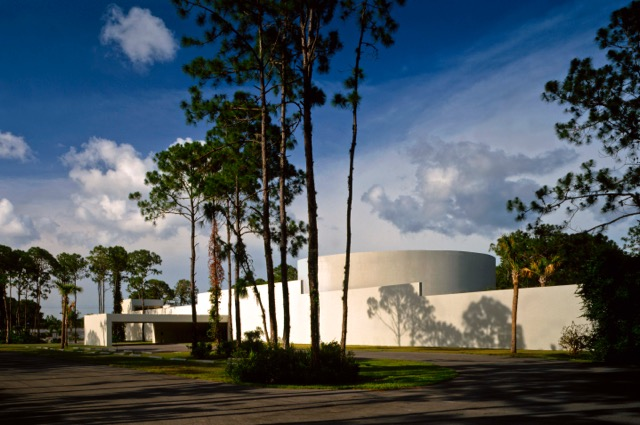
St Thomas More Church (1986)

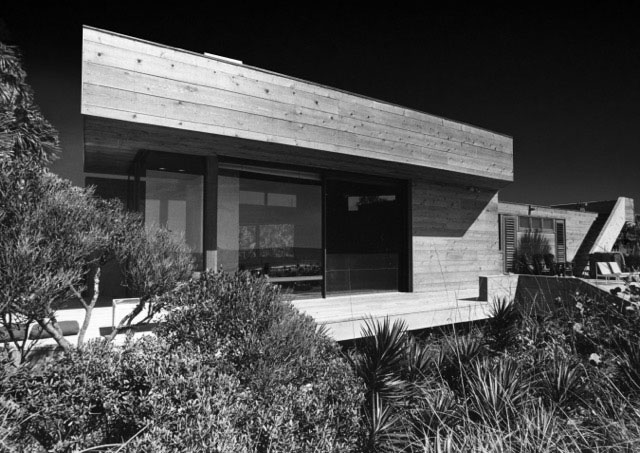
Weld Beach House (1966)

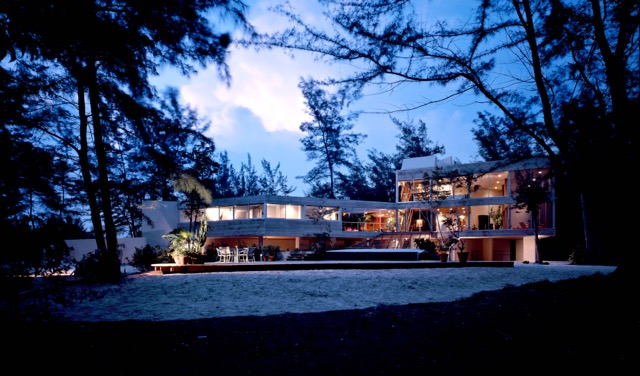
Lido Bayfront Residence (1984, demolished 2010)

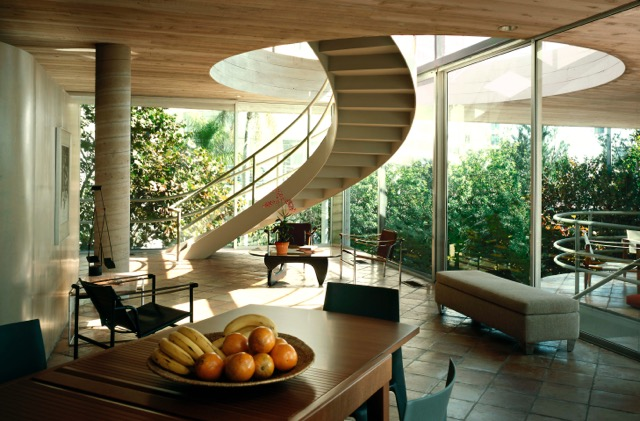
Gregg Beach House (1982, demolished 2018)
