= Homelessness in Washington =

Homelessness in Washington may refer to:

- Homelessness in Washington (state)
- Homelessness in Washington, D.C.
