= Grand Rapids Downtown Market =

Public market in Grand Rapids, Michigan

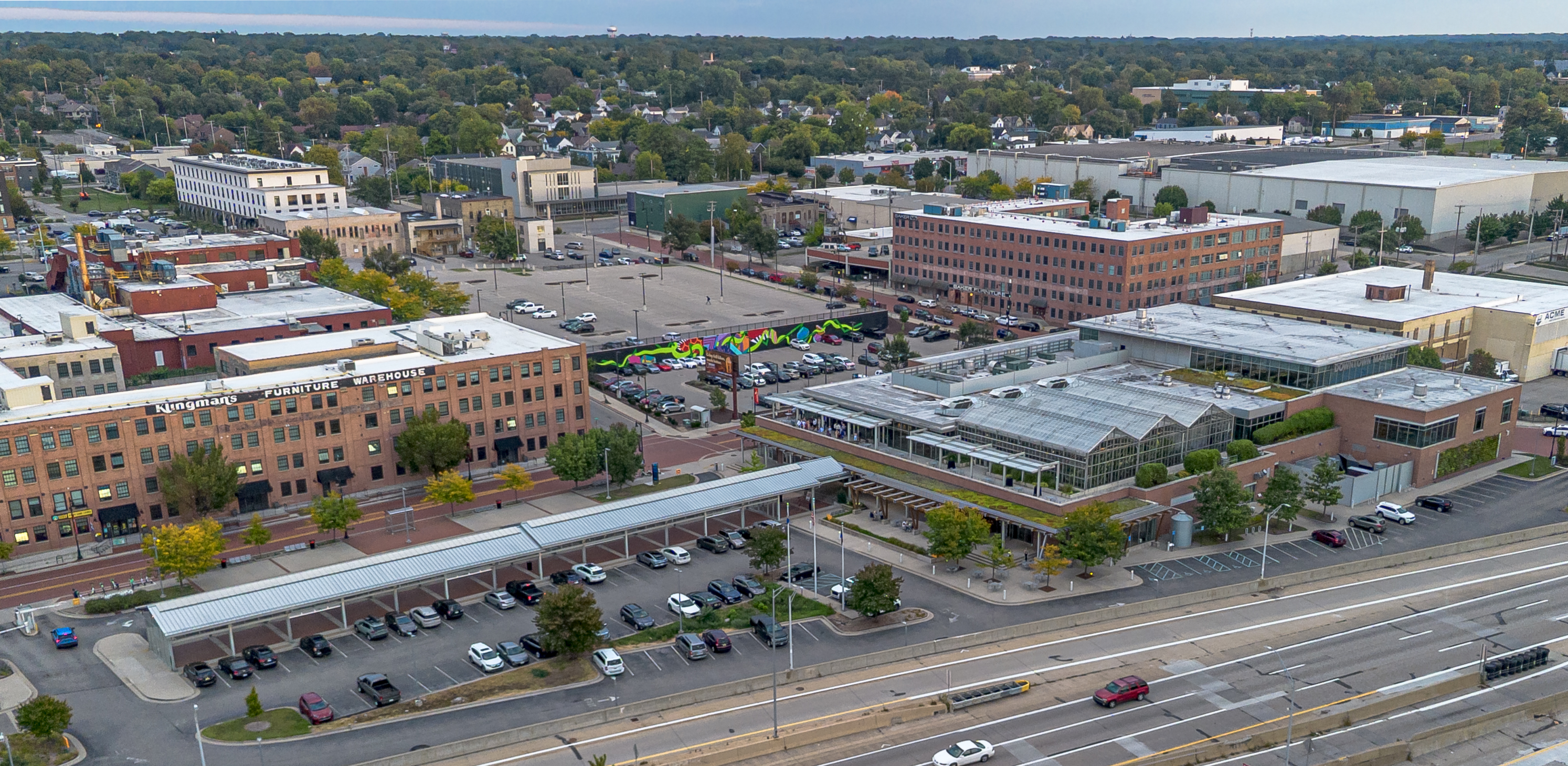
- The Downtown Market, visible in the foreground
- Location: Grand Rapids, Michigan
- Opened: September 2, 2013; 13 years ago
- Architect: Hugh A. Boyd Architects
- Website: downtownmarketgr.com
- Grand Rapids Downtown Market
- Environment: Indoor and outdoor
- Goods sold: General goods
- Days normally open: Everyday
- Number of tenants: 20+

The Grand Rapids Downtown Market is a public market in Grand Rapids, Michigan. Opened in 2013, the market currently has over twenty tenants present and can host over fifty outdoor vendors for a farmers market.

== History ==
2013 logo

Beginning in the 1990s, Grand Rapids began to experience renewed growth following a partnership between local wealthy philanthropists and the city, especially with the creation of non-profit Grand Action, which focused on downtown development. In 2010, Market Ventures performed a feasibility study that supported the construction of a market in Grand Rapids citing the presence of over 12,000 farms located in surrounding counties, with inspiration for the market being drawn from Eastern Market, Faneuil Hall, markets in Grand Central Station and San Francisco Ferry Building.

Recognized as the first LEED Gold certified market in the United States, it was designed by Hugh A. Boyd Architects and cost $32 million ($40,201,143 in 2022). Many of the materials present in the market were reused from previous structures that existed on the property. Ground source heat pumps also provide heat for the structure while outdoors, a snowmelt system exists on the ground to maintain safe and convenient use during colder seasons.

The Grand Rapids Downtown Market opened on September 2, 2013, and attracted 30,000 people on its opening day. One of its first vendors was Tacos El Cuñado. In its first year, the market experienced $5 million in sales. In 2015, Slows Bar BQ entered as an anchor tenant, leaving the market in 2023.

== Grand Rapids Christkindl Markt ==
In November 2023, the market announced the opening of a Christkindl Markt with free entry that has food vendors, a German-style beverage hall, live entertainment and curling lessons. Mugs used for beverages at the market are designed in Grand Rapids and constructed in Germany, with the thousands of mugs taking ten months to be delivered to Grand Rapids. For the 2024 Christkindl Markt, about 250,000 people visited the market during the six week period. In 2025, The Independent listed the Grand Rapids Christkindl Markt in its list of "Twelve of the best US Christmas markets", writing "Grand Rapids has come late to the Christmas market party ... But it’s making up for lost time with a grand European-style Christmas village at the Downtown Market that features more than 60 artisan and food vendors."

== Layout and operation ==
Located on a 3.5 acres (1.4 ha) site adjacent to U.S. Route 131, the Grand Rapids Downtown Market has a three-story, 132,000 square feet (12,300 m^{2}) building with 24 permanent spaces for indoor vendors and an outdoor canopy providing 52 stalls for a farmers' market. Some vendors at the market accept Supplemental Nutrition Assistance Program (SNAP) food stamps to assist low income individuals.

At the ground level, windows provide visibility to various vendors by the passerby. This first level has a bakery, butcher, chocolatier, grocers and dining options. On the second floor, commercial-grade kitchens exists to help incubate new businesses and to educate students. The educational kitchen, which is used for cooking and nutrition classes, has counters placed on hydraulics that can be lowered to provide increased accessibility. Food storage, event spaces and a two-story greenhouse are also located on the second floor. Office space is available for start-up companies to lease on the third floor. Indoor furnishings are provided locally from Steelcase.

== Reception ==
The market received various awards for its design and use in 2015. Architectural Record described the Grand Rapids Downtown Market as "a fantasyland of eats" and "a dream come true from the perspective of urban planning and local business", listing the market in its Good Design Is Good Business 2015 awards. The market was a silver medalist for the 2015 Rudy Bruner Award for Urban Excellence. The American Institute of Architects' New Jersey chapter provided a 2015 Honor Award for the "Built Open" category to Hugh A. Boyd Architects for its work on the market. The Association of Retail Environments awarded the market its 2015 Sustainability Project of the Year award citing the sustainability of its design and its approaches for food services.

In 2016, the American Planning Association awarded the market with the 2016 National Planning Excellence Award: Economic Planning and Development.
