= Opportunity Village =

Organized homeless community located in Eugene, Oregon, US

- Homeless encampment
- Location within Oregon
- Coordinates: 44.0616227°N 123.1223195°W
- Country: United States
- State: Oregon
- County: Lane
- City: Eugene
- Founded: 2014; 12 years ago
- Website: https://www.eugene-or.gov/3705/Opportunity-Village

Opportunity Village is an organized homeless community in Eugene, Oregon. It is supported by the non-profit organization Opportunity Village Eugene (OVE).

== History ==
The village began in the wake of the Occupy movement in Eugene. After the Occupy encampments had been disassembled, mayor Kitty Piercy assembled a task force to address the housing crisis in the city.

In 2013, the non-profit organization Opportunity Village Eugene (OVE) was founded with the goal of addressing the issue of affordable housing. That August, the Eugene City Council voted to donate land to OVE and approved the construction of a village.

Opportunity Village opened in May 2014. It was funded by $100,000 in private donations, and labor and materials were also donated. Each of the 30 houses was constructed for $3,300. Housing consists of small bungalows and Conestoga huts.

== Organization ==
The village is located on a gated, city-owned lot. It has a capacity for over 30 residents and residents share maintenance and cleaning duties. There is no time limit for how long residents can stay in the village, but they are expected to transition to permanent housing.

Each structure is 80 square feet in size. Individual homes are not hooked up to electricity or plumbing, and residents share communal cooking, gathering, and sanitary spaces.

== See also ==
- Quixote Village, a similar initiative in Olympia, Washington
