= Tricia Ward =

American social practice artist

- Born: 1951 (age 74–75); Berkeley, California, United States
- Education: San Francisco Art Institute
- Known for: Social practice art, environmental art, Installation art, sculpture
- Awards: Rudy Bruner Award for Urban Excellence, National Endowment for the Arts, California Arts Council, California Community Foundation
- Website: Tricia Ward

Tricia Ward is a Los Angeles–based artist whose work has included public and environmental art, sculpture, and social practice art. She emerged in the 1980s, when collaborations with underserved youth and urban groups that bridged art and social change began to gain institutional attention. Her work combines collaborative, interdisciplinary approaches that include physical transformations of derelict urban environments into "pocket parks," environmental remediation, cultural and educational programming, public policy and civic engagement.

Tricia Ward/ACLA, La Tierra de la Culebra, 1992–present, Highland Park Neighborhood, Los Angeles.

Ward has created public projects in New York, Houston, Detroit and Buenos Aires. However, the majority of her work has been undertaken in Los Angeles, through the nonprofit organization that she founded and led, ACLA (Art Community Land Activism), originally known as ARTScorpsLA. The organization's most well-known projects include the art parks La Tierra de la Culebra and Spiraling Orchard, and the public, multi-mural project, "Walls of Reclamation." Ward's work has been recognized by institutions including the National Endowment for the Arts, California Arts Council, California Community Foundation, and Getty Trust, among others. In 1999, ACLA was awarded a Rudy Bruner Award for Urban Excellence Silver Medal.

== Background ==
Ward was born in Berkeley, California in 1951. She attended the San Francisco Art Institute, earning a BFA in 1972. In the early 1970s, she moved to Galveston, Texas, where she met architect John Maroney, whom she married in 1981. She and Maroney split time between Galveston and New York City in the 1980s. During that time, Ward produced mixed-media sculpture and assemblage, while also developing a hybrid concept blending art and parks, an offshoot of her work then with New York's Green Guerillas. Between 1986 and 1989, she organized a community transformation of part of the turn-of-the-century Sara D. Roosevelt Park in New York's Lower East Side, which included an earthwork and community garden.

In 1990, Ward, Maroney, and their daughter Leila moved to Los Angeles. Shortly after the 1992 Los Angeles riots, Ward became involved in a youth art-workshop project called "Re-Wing LA," intended to respond to the unrest. Finding that project short-lived and unresponsive to constituents, however, she initiated her own community project: reclaiming an abandoned, neglected parcel of land in her multi-ethnic Highland Park neighborhood. Beginning without permission, she eventually obtained a use agreement from the owner and grants from the Los Angeles Cultural Affairs Department and (later) Los Angeles Conservation Corps; out of this work, she formed a nonprofit arts and education organization: ARTScorpLA, that was active for more than three decades; it was later renamed ACLA (Art Community Land Activism).

In addition to her art practice and work leading ACLA, Ward served as arts commissioner to the City of Los Angeles Commission on Children, Youth and Their Families from 1995 to 2003, and taught for many years in the Department of Public Art Studies and Urban Cultural Planning at the University of Southern California Roski School of Art and Design.

Tricia Ward/ACLA, Spiraling Orchard, 1996–2014, Temple-Beaudry Neighborhood, Los Angeles.

== Work ==
Ward's unique practice merges interests in the physicality of three-dimensional artworks and environments, neighborhood and community revitalization, and urban land use. Writers have noted her methodology's focus on gaining community acceptance—often taking up residency among them—its flexible mode of light, nonprofit management (as opposed to the rigidity of city agencies), and fairly "radical notion of public space as continually contested territory belonging to no single owner permanently." Her work generally involves collaboration among multiple constituencies with interests in community open space, arts, education, and youth development. Art writer Michael Brenson described Ward's approach as premised on equity, inclusiveness, conversation, non-judgment and a commitment that includes "her willingness to make this involvement part of everyday life for an indefinite period."

=== Early studio art ===
Ward's early art included clay and bronze sculpture, reliquaries and mixed-media assemblage. This work often fused figurative elements, references to ancient civilizations and ritual, and social and political concerns. Her show "Body Works" (Houston, 1978) featured pink-hued figurative sculpture created from molds and embedded in mounds of white sand. Houston Chronicle critic Charlotte Moser wrote that this work "translated the subtleties of the human body into delicate ceramics," notable for their organic fluidity (without reference to body parts) and an eroticism recalling Edward Weston's photographs. In the later show, "Reflections of Kingship" (Galveston, 1986, with Marianne van Lent), Ward exhibited an altar-like work (Tableau of Incantations), masks, and textured sculpture using found objects that a review described as "three-dimensional cave paintings" offering modern interpretations of ancient themes and animal motifs.

=== ACLA (ARTScorpLA) ===
ACLA's activities included the development of art parks and community centers, mural painting, educational and internship programs, and cultural programming.

The organization emerged from Ward's efforts to clear a derelict parcel of land in her Highland Park neighborhood. She mobilized a group of youth volunteers and with them dug up the site, unearthing stone foundation remnants from several houses that they reused to, among other things, build an amphitheater. Through a series of discussions, the group also developed a motif for the site—the serpent (la Culebra), a Mayan and Asian symbol of wisdom and renewal—which would serve as the site's name, La Tierra de la Culebra, and inspire its most striking feature, a 450-foot, winding sculpture made of brick and stone. Over time the site was developed into a multi-level community park, with olive trees, herb, vegetable and flower gardens, quirky statues, furniture, and a pond. For nearly three decades, it has served as a place of recreation, education, ecological work and celebration. In 2003, it was zoned as "open space" and registered as an official city park.

ACLA's next large project, undertaken in 1995, was Spiraling Orchard, which involved the reclamation of a half-acre, toxic and non-arable, former oil field in the transitional Temple-Beaudry neighborhood. For this project, ACLA and local volunteers eventually collaborated with USC's Sustainable Cities program on a process known as phytoremediation, planting a garden of fruit trees in addition to creating a pavilion, symbolic sculptural pieces (spiral, sundial and ziggurat structures), and community and educational programs. The park remained active for nearly two decades.

Tricia Ward, A Member of the Community of Spirits Within and Among a Community of Trees, composite materials, 2019–20. Los Angeles County Arboretum.

Some of ACLA's other projects included Studio Chinatown, a community center and performance space offering classes, art studio space and cultural programming; the Francis Avenue Garden Park in Koreatown, developed between 1996 and 1999; and "Beat the Drum Fest," a multi-ethnic drumming festival organized by Ward in 2002 and presented at the Craft and Folk Art Museum and Ford Amphitheater in 2012 and 2013, respectively. "Walls of Reclamation" (1995–7) was a mural and beautification project involving roughly 30 murals, which mixed traditionally schooled artists (such as Eva Cockcroft, Margaret Garcia, Man One and Frank Romero), spray-can artists, volunteers and students. It included the 560-foot-long painting Earth Memories—then the city's largest single-concept mural—which depicts the history of the universe, from the Big Bang to modern life in Los Angeles.

=== Other work ===
Ward's work outside of ACLA includes studio and installation art, performance, public projects, and writing on public policy. Her site-responsive piece, Shared Foundations (Project Row Houses, Houston, 1999), engaged community members to create a series of linoleum painted tiles, which she assembled into a narrative floor in a row house she was given for the project. In 2001, she and Deborah Grotfeldt initiated Riches of Detroit: Faces of Detroit as part of the Detroit Institute of Art show "Artists' Take on Detroit: Projects for the Tricentennial." They worked with diverse Detroiters and organizations to transform unused buildings and vacant lots on a city block, including two rehabilitated houses that would serve as student residences, a community center and an art park. The project was documented in a multimedia presentation and installation at the institute that included hay bales and concrete structures replicating park's conversation area. In 2021, she created A Member of the Community of Spirits … for the Los Angeles County Arboretum exhibition, "The Nature of Sculpture II."

Ward's essays and ideas about public art, work with youth, and urban land use have been presented in the book, Conversations at the Castle: Changing Audiences and Contemporary Art (1998), the journal, Local Environment, and in numerous lectures at graduate programs throughout the United States.

== Recognition ==
Ward's work has been recognized by awards, grants and fellowships from the California Arts Council, California Community Foundation, City of Los Angeles, Getty Trust for Visual Arts, Headlands Center for the Arts, and National Endowment for the Arts, among others. In 1999, ACLA was recognized with a Rudy Bruner Award for Urban Excellence Silver Medal for its "innovative approaches to urban revitalization" and work with youth and communities. Ward's artwork belongs to the public collection of the J. Paul Getty Museum.
