= Rudy Bruner Award for Urban Excellence =

American award in architecture

The Rudy Bruner Award for Urban Excellence
- Awarded for: A biennial award recognizing "places that are developed with such vision and imagination that they transform urban problems into creative solutions."
- Sponsored by: The Bruner Foundation
- Location: Cambridge, Massachusetts
- Country: U.S.
- Reward: US$50,000 (Gold Medal) US$10,000 (Silver Medal)
- First award: 1987
- Website: www.rudybruneraward.org

The Rudy Bruner Award for Urban Excellence (RBA) was established in 1986 by Cambridge, Massachusetts architect Simeon Bruner. The award is named after Simeon Bruner's late father, Rudy Bruner, founder of the Bruner Foundation. According to the Bruner Foundation, the RBA was created to increase understanding of the role of architecture in the urban environment and promote discussion of what constitutes urban excellence. The award seeks to identify and honor places, rather than people, that address economic and social concerns along with urban design. 2019 was the final year of the award program, and the RBA transitioned into the Rudy Bruner Center for Urban Excellence at the University at Buffalo's School of Architecture and Planning. The Rudy Bruner Center utilizes the RBA's list of award winning projects as a resource for academic research and teaching.

== Description ==
According to the Bruner Foundation, the award is intended to be a platform for the discussion of issues related to urban architecture, planning and revitalization. It has been recognized by the United States Conference of Mayors, The United States Department of Housing and Urban Development, and the Environmental Design Research Association.

The biennial award recognizes one Gold Medal and four silver medal winners each cycle. Each medalist is documented with a detailed case study published online and in a book by the Bruner Foundation. The gold medal winner receives $50,000 and the four silver medalists each receive $10,000 which must be used to benefit the project. These winners are chosen by a diverse committee of professionals involved in design and development. These committee members include architects, landscape architects, planners, developers, community organizers, financiers, and the mayor of a major metropolitan area.

== Criteria and selection process ==
The selection process involves a study of a project's effect on its urban environment including a detailed application, discussion by selection committee members, and site visits to finalist projects. A selection committee is organized anew for each award cycle.

In order to be eligible for consideration, projects must be:

- an actual place, not just a plan or a program;
- completed and in operation for sufficient amount of time to demonstrate success
- located in the continental US

There are no distinct categories. Projects may include any type that makes a positive contribution to the urban environment. Urban environment is broadly defined to include cities, towns, neighborhoods, counties and/or regions. Previous applicants and honorable mention winners may apply up to three times. Previous winners are not eligible.

== Resources ==
In 1998, the University at Buffalo collaborated with the Bruner Foundation and the Urban Design Project of the School of Architecture and Planning to create a digital archive, making data gathered in reference to past winners of the Rudy Bruner Award for Urban Excellence accessible to the public. The goal of this archive is to allow public "access to award winning and fully documented urban design case studies as a resource for architecture students and practitioners as they study precedents in urban design." The Digital Archive is managed by the UB Institutional Repository.

The Bruner Foundation has published fifteen books containing detailed case studies of award-winning projects.

== List of winners ==
2019 Gold Medal

Crosstown Concourse, Memphis, Tennessee

2019 Silver Medals

- Buffalo Bayou Park, Houston, Texas
- Sulphur Springs Downtown, Grand Rapids, Michigan
- Parisite Skatepark, New Orleans, Louisiana
- Beyond Walls, Lynn, Massachusetts

2017 Gold Medal

SteelStacks Arts and Cultural Campus, Bethlehem, Pennsylvania

2017 Silver Medals

La Kretz Innovation Campus + Arts District Park, Los Angeles, California
Bruce C. Bolling Municipal Building, Boston, Massachusetts
Iberville Offsite Rehabs I & II, New Orleans, Louisiana
Chicago’s Riverwalk, Chicago, Illinois

2015 Gold Medal

Miller's Court, Baltimore, Maryland

2015 Silver Medals

Falls Park on the Reedy, Greenville, South Carolina
Grand Rapids Downtown Market, Grand Rapids, Michigan
Quixote Village, Olympia, Washington
Uptown District, Cleveland, Ohio

2013 Gold Medal

Inspiration Kitchens--Garfield Park, Chicago, Illinois

2013 Silver Medals

Congo Street Initiative, Dallas, Texas
Louisville Waterfront Park, Louisville, Kentucky
The Steel Yard, Providence, Rhode Island
Via Verde, Bronx, New York City, New York

2011 Gold Medal:

The Bridge Homeless Assistance Center, Dallas, Texas

2011 Silver Medals:

Brooklyn Bridge Park, Brooklyn, New York City, New York
Phoenix Civic Space Park, Phoenix, Arizona
Gary Comer Youth Center/Gary Comer College Prep, Chicago, Illinois
The Santa Fe Railyard Redevelopment, Santa Fe, New Mexico

2009 Gold Medal:

Inner-City Arts, Los Angeles

2009 Silver Medals:

Hunts Point Riverside Park, Bronx, New York City, New York
Millennium Park, Chicago, Illinois
St. Joseph Rebuild Center, New Orleans, Louisiana
The Community Chalkboard and Podium, Charlottesville, Virginia

2007 Gold Medal:

Children’s Museum of Pittsburgh, Pittsburgh, Pennsylvania

2007 Silver Medals:

Artists for Humanity Epicenter, Boston, Massachusetts
Crossroads Project and Marsupial Bridge, Milwaukee, Wisconsin
High Point Redevelopment Project, Seattle
LA Design Center, Los Angeles
Columbus Circle Public Plaza, New York City

2005 Gold Medal:

Portland Streetcar Project, Portland, Oregon

2005 Silver Medals:

Lower Town Artist Relocation Program, Paducah, Kentucky
Heidelberg Project, Detroit, Michigan
Fruitvale Village, Oakland, California
Downtown Silver Spring, Maryland

2003 Gold Medal:

Camino Nuevo Charter Academy, Los Angeles, California

2003 Silver Medals:

Bridgemarket, New York City, New York
Colorado Court Housing, Santa Monica, California
Red Hook Community Justice Center, Brooklyn, New York City
Providence River Relocation, Providence, Rhode Island

2001 Gold Medal:

The Village of Arts and Humanities, Philadelphia

2001 Silver Medals:

Swan’s Marketplace (10th Street Market), Oakland, California
South Platte River Greenway, Denver, Colorado
New Jersey Performing Arts Center, Newark, New Jersey
Lower East Side Tenement Museum, New York City, New York

1999 Gold Medal:

Yerba Buena Gardens, San Francisco, California

1999 Silver Medals:

ARTScorps LA, Los Angeles, California
National AIDS Memorial Grove, San Francisco
Parkside Historic Preservation Corporation, Philadelphia
Portland Public Market, Portland, Maine

1997 Gold Medal:

The Times Square, New York City, New York

1997 Silver Medals:

Cleveland Historic Warehouse District, Cleveland, Ohio
Project Row Houses, Houston, Texas
Center in the Square, Roanoke, Virginia
Hismen Hin-nu (Sun Gate) Terrace, Oakland, California

1995 Winner:

Maya Angelou Community Initiative, Portland, Oregon

1995 Finalists:

Campus Circle, Milwaukee, Wisconsin
Dudley Street Neighborhood Initiative, Boston, Massachusetts
Greenpoint Manufacturing and Design Center, Brooklyn, New York City, New York
Harlem Meer, New York City, New York
Lowertown, Saint Paul, Minnesota

1993 Co-winners:

Harbor Point (Columbia Point), Boston, Massachusetts
New Community Corporation, Newark, New Jersey

1993 Finalists:

Betts-Longworth Historic District, Cincinnati
Beyond Homelessness, San Francisco, California
The Park at Post Office Square, Boston, Massachusetts

1991 Winner:

Greenmarket, New York City, New York

1991 Finalists:

Brooklyn-Queens Greenway, Brooklyn and Queens, New York City, New York
Ocean Drive Improvement Project, Miami Beach, Florida
Roslindale Village Main Street, Boston, Massachusetts
West Clinton Action Plan, Portland, Oregon

1989 Co-winners:

Tenant Interim Leasing Program, New York City, New York
Downtown Plan, Portland, Oregon

1989 Finalists:

Southwest Corridor Project, Boston, Massachusetts
Stowe Recreation Path, Stowe, Vermont
Radial Reuse Project, Lincoln, Nebraska
Cabrillo Village, Saticoy, California

1987 Winner:

Pike Place Market, Seattle, Washington

1987 Finalists:

Casa Rita, South Bronx, New York City, New York
Quality Hill, Kansas City, Missouri
Fairmount Health Center, Philadelphia, Pennsylvania

== List of publications ==
2015 Challenging Conventions: The 2015 Rudy Bruner Award for Urban Excellence, Richard Wener, PhD; Jay Farbstein, FAIA, PhD; Anne-Marie Lubenau, AIA; and Robert Shibley, FAIA, FAICP; Edited by Elizabeth Chesla, MA

2013 Inspiring Change: 2013 Rudy Bruner Award for Urban Excellence, Richard Wener, PhD; Jay Farbstein, FAIA, PhD; Anne-Marie Lubenau, AIA; and Robert Shibley, FAIA, AICP

2011 Partnering Strategies for the Urban Edge: 2011 Rudy Bruner Award for Urban Excellence, Robert Shibley, AIA, AICP, with Brandy Brooks, Director, Rudy Bruner Award, Jay Farbstein, PhD, FAIA, and Richard Wener, PhD, Bruner Foundation, 2011.

2009 Urban Transformation: 2009 Rudy Bruner Award for Urban Excellence, Jay Farbstein, PhD, FAIA, with Emily Axelrod, MCP, Robert Shibley, AIA, AICP, and Richard Wener, PhD, Bruner Foundation, 2009.

2007 Building Sustainable Neighborhoods: 2007 Rudy Bruner Award for Urban Excellence, Richard Wener, PhD, with Emily Axelrod, MCP, Jay Farbstein, PhD, FAIA, and Robert Shibley, AIA, AICP, Bruner Foundation, 2007.

2005 Reinventing Downtown: 2005 Rudy Bruner Award for Urban Excellence, Robert Shibley with Emily Axelrod, Jay Farbstein, FAIA, and Richard Wener, PhD, Bruner Foundation, 2005.

2003 New Directions in Urban Excellence, Jay Farbstein with Emily Axelrod, Robert Shibley and Richard Wener, Bruner Foundation, 2003.

2001 Placemaking for Change: 2001 Rudy Bruner Award for Urban Excellence, Richard Wener with Emily Axelrod, Jay Farbstein and Polly Welch, Bruner Foundation, 2002.

1999 Commitment to Place: Urban Excellence and Community, Robert G. Shibley with Emily Axelrod, Jay Farbstein, and Richard Wener, Bruner Foundation, 1999.

1997 Visions of Urban Excellence, Emily Axelrod, Jay Farbstein and Richard Wener, Bruner Foundation, 1998.

1995 Building Coalitions for Urban Excellence, Jay Farbstein and Richard Wener, Bruner Foundation, 1996.

1993 Rebuilding Communities: Re-creating Urban Excellence, Jay Farbstein and Richard Wener, Bruner Foundation, 1993.

1991 Connections: Creating Urban Excellence, Jay Farbstein and Richard Wener, Bruner Foundation, 1992.

1989 Breakthroughs: Re-creating the American City, Neal R. Peirce and Robert Guskind, Center for Urban Policy Research, Rutgers University, 1993.

1987 Urban Excellence, Philip Langdon with Robert Shibley and Polly Welch, Van Nostrand Reinhold, 1990.
