= Tacos El Cuñado =

Mexican restaurant chain based in Grand Rapids

- Industry: Restaurant
- Founded: 2008; 18 years ago in Grand Rapids, Michigan
- Founder: Leo Schlesinger
- Number of locations: 11
- Area served: West Michigan
- Products: Mexican cuisine

Tacos El Cuñado is a restaurant chain serving Mexican cuisine across West Michigan and is based in Grand Rapids, Michigan. Each franchise operates independently with its own menu and items specialized for its customers.

== History ==
Tacos El Cuñado was founded by Canadian American Leo Schlesinger, who moved from Toronto to East Grand Rapids, Michigan in the 1990s. Schlesinger, who owned multiple businesses in the area, opened the first restaurant in a former ice cream stand in 2008 and had the wives of his employees prepare various Mexican dishes for customers. In 2010, Schlesinger leased the first Tacos El Cuñado restaurant to Humberto Alvarez, who served as the restaurant's franchise operator.

In 2013, controversy arose when LINC Community Revitalization included the original Tacos El Cuñado at 1342 Grandville Ave. SW on a list for demolishing blighted buildings using state funds. Schlesinger said that he was not selling the property and instead wanted to expand the Tacos El Cuñado brand. Later that year, it was announced that a franchise operated by Mario Cascante and Hector Lopez would open at the Grand Rapids Downtown Market.

By 2015, the restaurant chain expanded outside of the Grand Rapids area and entered the Holland, Michigan market, operated by franchisee owner Miguel Cedeno. The restaurant planned to expand to Cedar Springs, Michigan in 2022 in a franchise operated by Edgar Vazquez and Juan Arias. A new brunch concept, Las Carnitas El Cuñado, was also opened in 2022.

A United States Department of Labor investigation in 2023 assisted 20 employees with receiving back wages after the Wage and Hour Division said that the Alpine franchise of Tacos El Cuñado violated the Fair Labor Standards Act, with the United States District Court for the Western District of Michigan ruling that the franchise had to pay $31,206 in back pay and an equal amount in damages to current and former workers.

== Reception ==
In a 2014 public vote by MLive Media Group, Tacos El Cuñado's Downtown Market location tied with Taqueria San Jose as having the best tacos in the Grand Rapids area.

== See also ==
- Wet burrito
