= Quixote Village =

Organized homeless community located in Olympia, Washington, US

- Homeless encampment
- Location within Washington (state)
- Coordinates: 47.02572°N 122.94314°W
- Country: United States
- State: Washington
- County: Thurston County
- City: Olympia
- Founded: 2013
- Website: HATC Quixote Village

Quixote Village, known officially as New Horizon Communities, is a two-acre community of 30 tiny homes for single homeless adults in Olympia, Washington.

It is located in an industrial area, zoned as permanent supportive housing and leased from Thurston County for $1 per year. It was built in 2013 for a construction cost of $3.1 million, and includes a clubhouse with laundry and showers. Each cottage has heating, electricity, and a half-bathroom.

== History ==
The village started as Quixote Camp, a small, nomadic tent camp in 2007. It had relocated more than 20 times, rotating between seven different church properties because of municipal ordinances which prohibited churches from hosting homeless people for longer than 90 days. In 2011, $1.5 million was designated for the construction of a tiny house village for homeless adults by the Washington State Legislature. A 2.1-acre lot was selected in an office district between Mottman Road and Black Lake Meadows Reserve. The overall development budget was $3,050,000. In December 2013, Quixote Village was established. Thurston County leases the land to Quixote Village for $1 a year.

In 2015, the community won a silver medal Rudy Bruner Award for Urban Excellence.

In 2022, each building was outfitted with solar panels. 206 panels were installed for a total output of 66 kilowatts. It was estimated to cost $150,000, but with the benefit of saving approximately $551,000 in energy consumption over a 40-year span.

== Organization and layout ==
Quixote Village has elections for leadership positions, and requires residents to follow certain rules. They are aided by a nonprofit board which serves as the legal landlord. The village is staffed by a full-time project manager and a social worker. Annual operating costs for the village are $250,000, which is approximately $8,333 per resident.

A planning committee of architects, designers, and camp residents worked on the layout of the village. Houses were to be placed in a horseshoe layout instead of clusters to prevent in-grouping, and residents stated that they preferred having an exterior porch to a larger interior space. Quixote Village has thirty 144-square foot houses which measure 8' x 18' inside and have front porches. It cost approximately $88,000 per unit. There is a central open space and a communal building which houses a kitchen, a shower and laundry room, administrative offices, and a meeting space.

To qualify for occupancy, applicants must be "single individuals who are chronically homeless at time of application and who may benefit from case management services." Residents must pay one-third of their income towards rent. However, of the 29 initial residents in 2013, half had no income whatsoever, and the average yearly income of the other half was $3,000.

== See also ==
- Opportunity Village, a similar initiative in Eugene, Oregon
