= The Chicago Coalition for the Homeless =

Nonprofit organization

The Chicago Coalition to End Homelessness
- Formation: 1980
- Purpose: “CCH builds power and makes change through community education, strategic campaigns, and policy initiatives that target root causes of homelessness across Chicago and Illinois.”
- Professional title: Social Services Organization
- Headquarters: 70 E Lake St, Chicago, IL 60601
- Website: https://www.chicagohomeless.org

The Chicago Coalition to End Homelessness (CCH) is a 501(c)(3) nonprofit organization that advocates to prevent and end homelessness in Cook County, Illinois. They do this by organizing various outreach programs, reentry projects, housing campaigns, and releasing yearly homelessness data to the public.

The CCH estimated the number of homeless people in Chicago had increased by 12% in the year 2020. They concluded that 65,000 individuals had struggled with homelessness that year.

== Early days ==
The Chicago Coalition to End Homelessness was founded in 1980 with a clear mission statement to organize and advocate to prevent and end homelessness, because they believe housing is a human right in a just society.

In the early days, the CCH focused on advocating for basic rights for the homeless. In December 1992, Illinois passed the first statewide law that allowed those experiencing homelessness to register to vote without a permanent address.

== Organizational structure ==
The CCH is made up of three departments: the public policy team, the community organizing team, and the legal team. The community organizing team is responsible for public rally’s, fundraisers, and other community events. The public policy team is advocating for new policies that support basic rights for homeless people. The legal team works with the public policy team to pass important legislation that will decrease the number of homeless people in Chicago.

In addition to the three departments that the CCH is structured around, a group of grassroots leaders make up the center of the organization. The grassroots leaders are people that have had first hand experience of homelessness in some type of way (i.e., being homeless or having experienced homelessness in any form). The leaders work alongside each of the three departments to discuss and make decisions on the policies that the CCH is working to implement.

The CCH does not and has never accepted funding from the government. They are solely funded by donations from private individuals and foundations that don't receive government funding.

== Partnerships ==
In February 2010, the CCH hosted a benefit concert called Hopefest. The show sold out and raised over $5,000 for the organization.

Later in 2010, the CCH partnered with the popular rock music festival Riot Fest. When the festival moved outdoors, in 2012, the CCH became the official charity of Riot Fest and has raised over $284,000 in total for the cause. Every year since the beginning of their partnership, the CCH hosts raffles, auctions, and other fundraising events at the festival.

== Recent work ==
In June 2022, many community groups felt that Mayor Lori Lightfoot and her administration were not doing enough to address homelessness. In response, the Chicago Coalition to end Homelessness rallied support among City Council members to support a campaign called Bring Chicago Home.

In December 2022, the CCH urged the City of Chicago to draft a weather emergency plan to combat the harsh winters effect on the homeless population after facing brutal conditions over the weekend. More than a million people were left without power and nine individuals lost their lives.

In Chicago, once the temperature begins to drop, many homeless people find shelter in the city's transit hubs. The number of people using these public spaces for shelter has grown exponentially in recent years. One popular spot is the heating stations at the Jefferson Park Transit Center. In January 2023, Chicago Transit Authority (CTA) workers have been instructed by the City of Chicago to remove them. Ali Simmons, an outreach coordinator with the CCH, reported that the coalition plans to conduct outreach at the station and supply them with possible resources.

Doug Schenkelberg, executive director of CCH, has said that it is problematic for the city to only have one out of six warming centers operate 24/7. The remaining five only operate during traditional business hours.

Schenkelberg also commented that the warming centers should open before weather conditions become deadly. Right now, they do not open unless temperatures reach below 35 degrees. However, the Centers for Disease Control and Prevention (CDC) report that hypothermia still poses a fatal threat when temperatures are above freezing.

In a similar situation, a Northwest Side neighborhood of Chicago voices a concern about a man living in a tent and wants him removed. The CCH stands firmly against removing the individual by stating that forcibly removing a person does more harm than good.
