= Angela Brooks =

American architect (born 20th century)

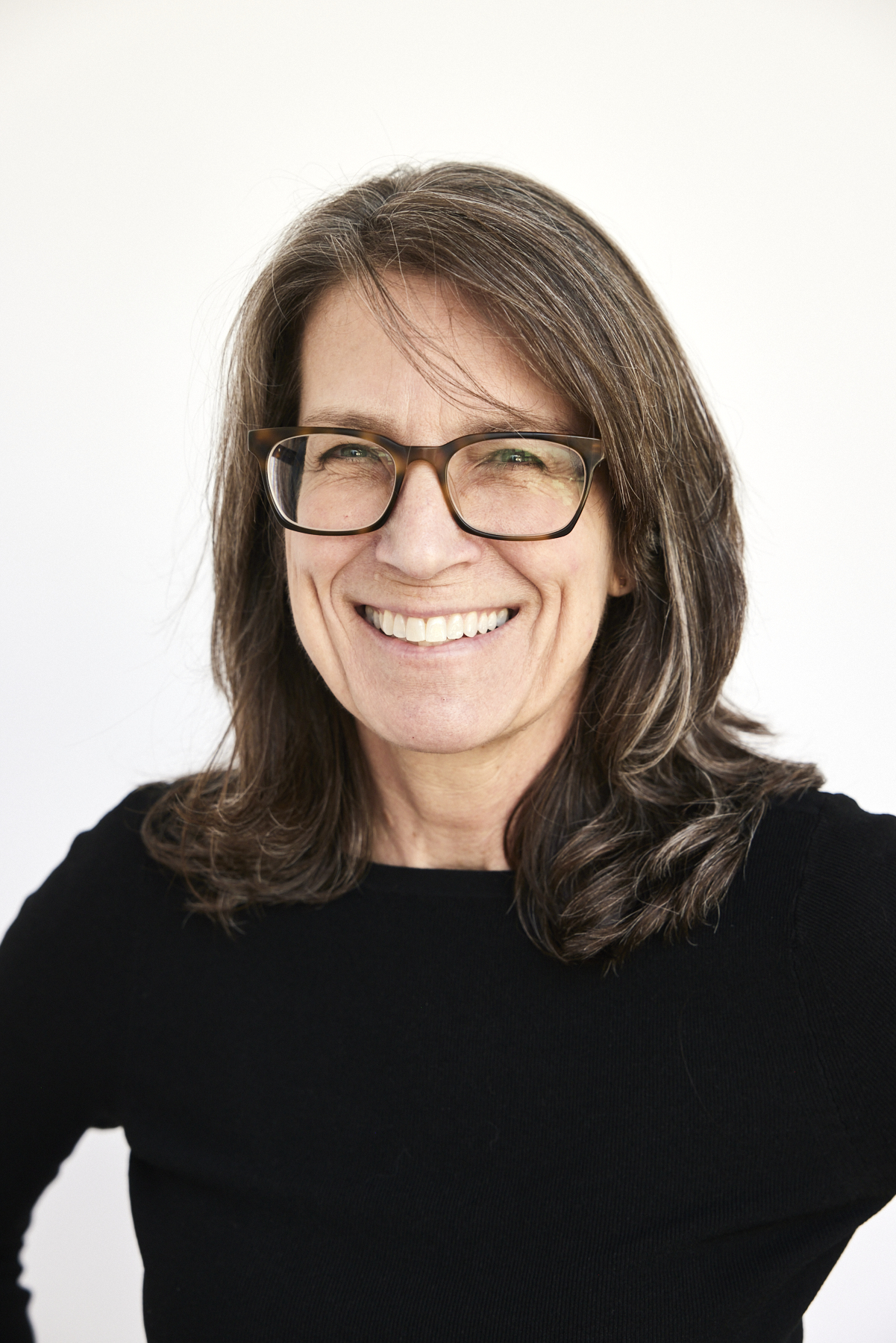
- Angela Brooks
- Born: 20th century
- Education: University of Florida
- Occupation: Architect
- Spouse: Lawrence Scarpa
- Practice: Brooks + Scarpa
- Buildings: Solar Umbrella house Colorado Court Housing; Bergamot Station
- Website: brooksscarpa.com (firm)

Angela Brooks, FAIA (born 20th century) is an American architect, based in Los Angeles, California.

She is a co-principal of Brooks + Scarpa, a Los Angeles–based architecture firm. She co-founded and served as president of Livable Places, a nonprofit development company created to stimulate neighborhood revitalization in Los Angeles.

== Significant works ==
Brooks was the project architect for the Colorado Court Housing project in Santa Monica, California, by Pugh + Scarpa (the former name of Brooks + Scarpa). The first multi-family housing project in the U.S. to be LEED certified, it has 46 units. It is also the first large residential complex in the U.S. to combine advanced sustainability with low-income housing. In continuing her commitment to socially progressive design, the program was designed for homeless residents with chronic mental illness as a gathering spot to create a sense of community.

== Awards and honors ==
Brooks is the recipient of the 2022 American Institute of Architects AIA Gold Medal, the institute's highest honor.

In 2020, Brooks received The Maybeck Award, the highest honor from the American Institute of Architects California. She is the first woman to receive the award.

She was a 2009 National American Institute of Architects Young Architects Award recipient, having made an "exceptional" contribution to architecture early in her career.

A Fellow of the American Institute of Architects, Brooks was also the 2010 honoree of the "Character Approved" Award by the USA Network for her "unparalleled ability to marry aesthetics, affordability and sustainability in the built environment", USA Network officials said. "As buildings are among the chief contributors to energy consumption and landfill waste, the role and the voice of the architect in the future of our planet is a vital one. I hope that this feature will help me raise awareness of the issues of sustainability that have been the main objects of my career."

Brooks was a recipient of the 2010 American Institute of Architects Firm Award.

Brooks + Scarpa was the winner of the 2014 Smithsonian Cooper-Hewitt National Design Museum Award in Architecture.

Brooks is featured in the book Woman in Green: Voices of Sustainable Design.

Brooks and Scarpa won the 2019 Marvin Hall of Fame.

== Personal life ==
Brooks is married to the American architect Lawrence Scarpa, a partner in Brooks + Scarpa. They met while both were attending the University of Florida.
