= Brooks + Scarpa =

American architectural firm

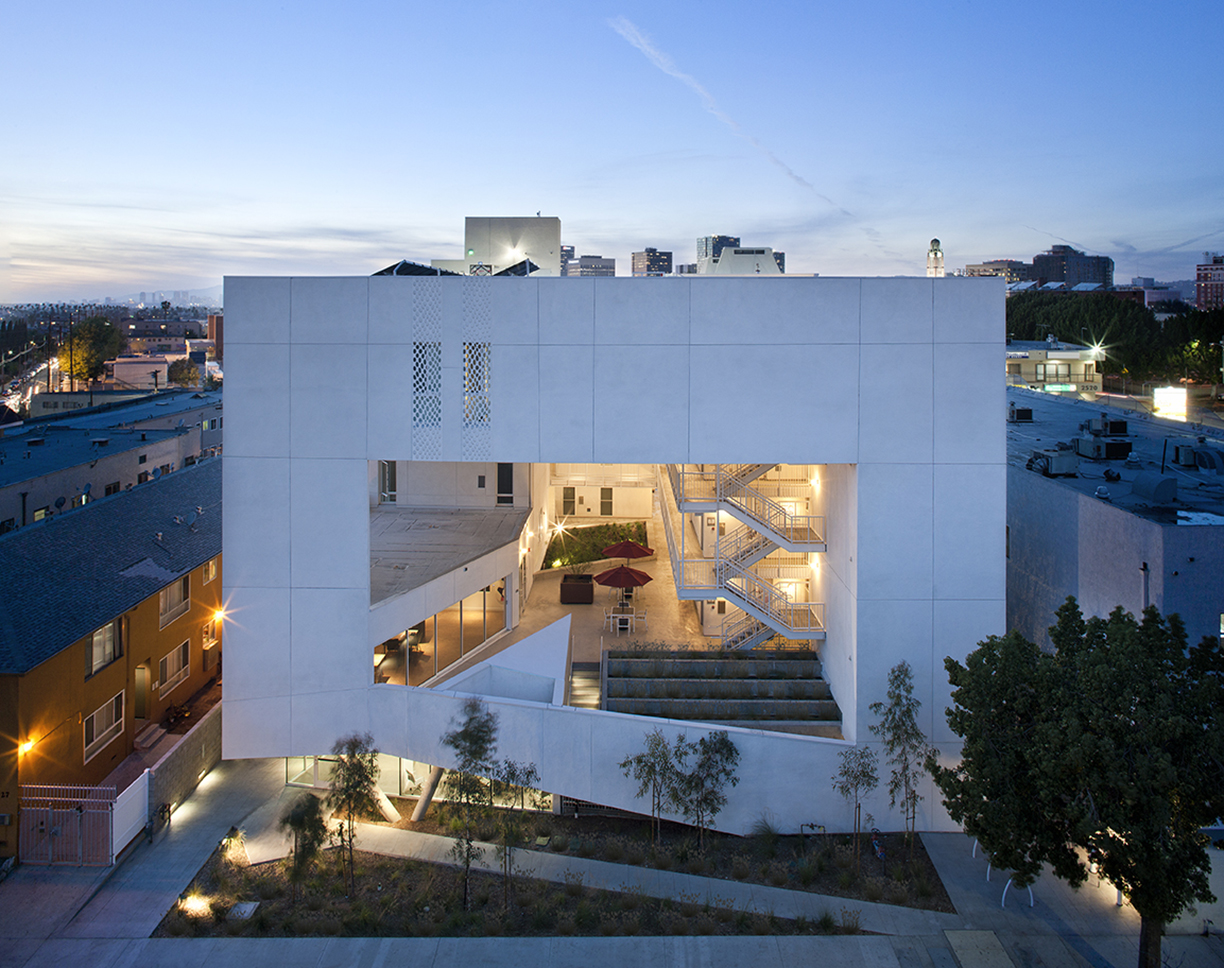
- The Six Affordable Veterans Housing, MacArthur Park, Los Angeles, CA

Practice information
- Partners: Lawrence Scarpa (from 1991); Angela Brooks (from 1999); Jeffrey Huber (from 2015); Gwynne Pugh (to 2010)
- Founded: 1991 (35 years ago) as Pugh + Scarpa
- Location: Los Angeles, California, U.S.

Brooks Scarpa Huber (originally Pugh + Scarpa, then Brooks + Scarpa) is an American architectural firm based in Los Angeles, California, Miami and Fort Lauderdale, Florida.

Angela Brooks, Lawrence Scarpa and Jeffrey Huber are principals of the firm. Brooks and Scarpa are the recipients of the 2022 AIA Gold Medal presented by the American Institute of Architects (AIA); the medal is the institute's highest honor.

In 2010, the firm was the recipient of the AIA's Firm Award. It was also chosen as the 2014 Smithsonian Cooper-Hewitt National Design Award Winner in Architecture. In 2025, Brooks, Scarpa and Huber received the Tau Sigma Delta Gold Medal for the American Institute of Architects and the Association of Collegiate Schools of Architecture, their highest honor.

Los Angeles–area projects completed by the firm include the Solar Umbrella house in Venice, the Orange Grove lofts in West Hollywood and the Colorado Court Housing project in Santa Monica.

== History ==
Pugh + Scarpa was formed in Santa Monica in 1991 by architects Lawrence Scarpa and Gwynne Pugh. In 1999, Scarpa's wife, Angela Brooks became the third principal. The company grew to include 43 professionals by 2004, with offices in Los Angeles, Ft. Lauderdale, Florida and Charlotte, North Carolina.

In 2010, Pugh left the firm to pursue his own design interests and the name was changed to Brooks + Scarpa to reflect the new leadership under Angela Brooks and Lawrence Scarpa.

Brooks co-founded and served as President of Livable Places, a nonprofit development company created to stimulate neighborhood revitalization in Los Angeles.

In 2015, Jeffrey Huber, FAIA joined the firm as principal and Director of Planning, Urban Design and Landscape. Huber manages the Ft. Lauderdale office.

In 2025, the firm changed its name to Brooks Scarpa Huber to reflect its current leadership.

== Honors and awards ==
Scarpa and Brooks are the recipients of the 2022 American Institute of Architects Gold Medal. As the institute's highest award, the Gold Medal honors an individual or pair whose significant body of work has had a lasting influence on the theory and practice of architecture. In 2020 Brooks received The Maybeck Award from the American Institute of Architects California. She is the first woman to receive the award. In 2018 Scarpa received the gold medal in Architecture from the American Institute of Architects Los Angeles Chapter. In 2014 Brooks + Scarpa was the recipient of the Smithsonian Cooper-Hewitt National Design Museum Award in Architecture. Other awards includes thirty-two national American Institute of Architects Institute awards, the 2024 American Institute of Architects Distinguished Practice Award, 2024 and 2005 Record Houses, 2003 Record Interiors, 2003 Rudy Bruner Award for Urban Excellence, 2013, 2012, 2011, 2006 and 2003 AIA COTE “Top Ten Green Building” Award and they were a finalist for the World Habitat Award, one of ten people selected worldwide. In 2004 The Architectural League of New York selected Scarpa as an “Emerging Voice” in architecture. Their work has been exhibited at the National Building Museum in Washington, DC, Museum of Contemporary Art (MOCA) and at numerous other venues worldwide. They have been Featured in NEWSWEEK and Scarpa appeared on The Oprah Winfrey Show. In 2009 Interior Design Magazine honored them with their Lifetime Achievement Award. In 2009, Angela Brooks received the USA Network "Character Approved" Award.

In 2010, the firm received the National and State of California AIA Firm Award, for 19 years of "consistent excellent work, including its seamless lending of architecture, art, and craft."

Co-principals Brooks and Huber are National AIA Young Architects Award awardees (Brooks 2009, Huber 2017). Brooks, Scarpa and Huber are Fellows of the American Institute of Architects and the Royal Institute of Canadian Architects. Brooks is the recipient of the 2020 National and State of California Citizen Architect award and the 2020 State of California's American Institute of Architects "Maybeck Award" for her lifetime body of work. Brooks is also the 2010 recipient of the “Character Approved” Award by USA Network for her “unparalleled ability to marry aesthetics, affordability and sustainability in the built environment”.

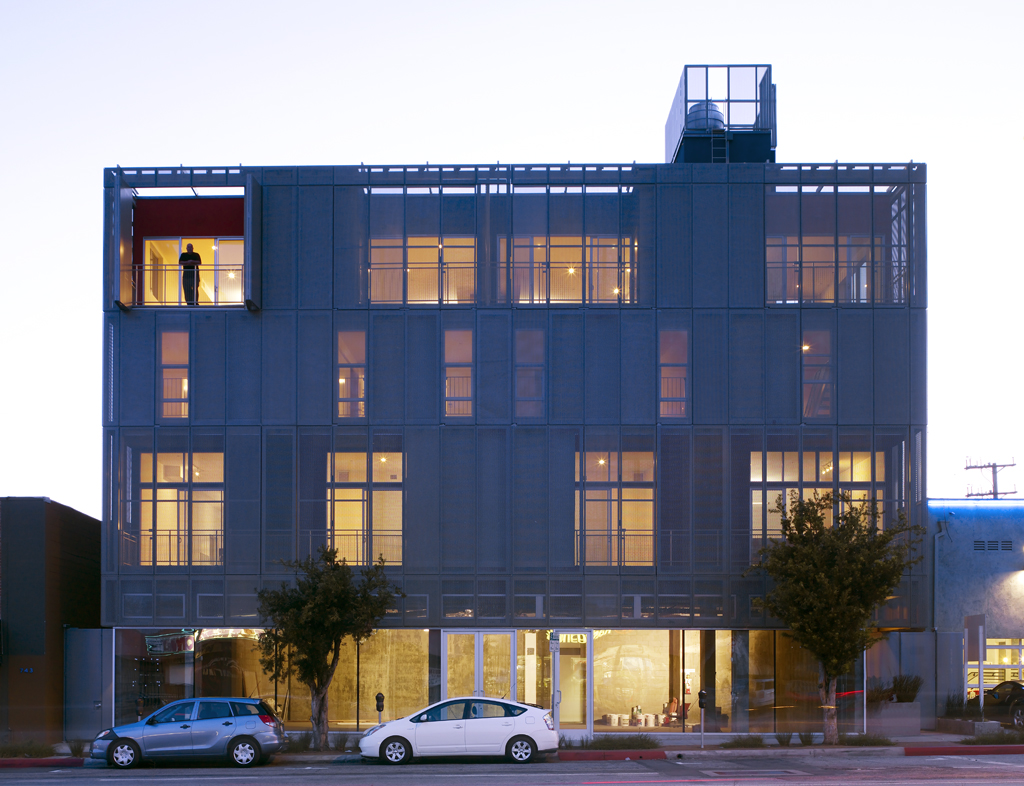
LEED Platinum certified Cherokee Lofts, 751 N. Fairfax, Los Angeles

== Sustainability ==
Known as a leaders in the field of sustainable design, their Solar umbrella house in Venice, California (the home of Scarpa and Brooks) has been named by the AIA as one of the Top Ten Green Projects. Their project Colorado Court in Santa Monica was the first Multi-family housing project in the US to be LEED certified. Colorado Court, the Solar Umbrella House and their Step Up on 2nd building (housing for mentally disabled homeless residents) are the only projects in the history of the American Institute of Architects (AIA) to win a National AIA Design Award, an AIA "COTE" Committee on the Environment "Top Ten Green Building" Award and a National AIA special interest award for a single project. No other firm in the history of the American Institute of Architects has ever achieved this triple award. In 2018 they won the $4.5 mil Housing Innovation Challenge Grant for scalable, sustainable solutions to affordable housing.

== Schedule and budgets ==
The firm has completed National AIA award-winning office projects in the entertainment industry Some of the work included projects for Danny DeVito, Jennifer Lopez, Jerry Bruckheimer and Marshall Herskovitz.

Work for Reactor Films, Jigsaw, CoOP and XAP Corporation were noted for their design, speed of construction and short completion time. Brooks + Scarpa gained a reputation for delivering award-winning designs within limited budgets and time constraints.

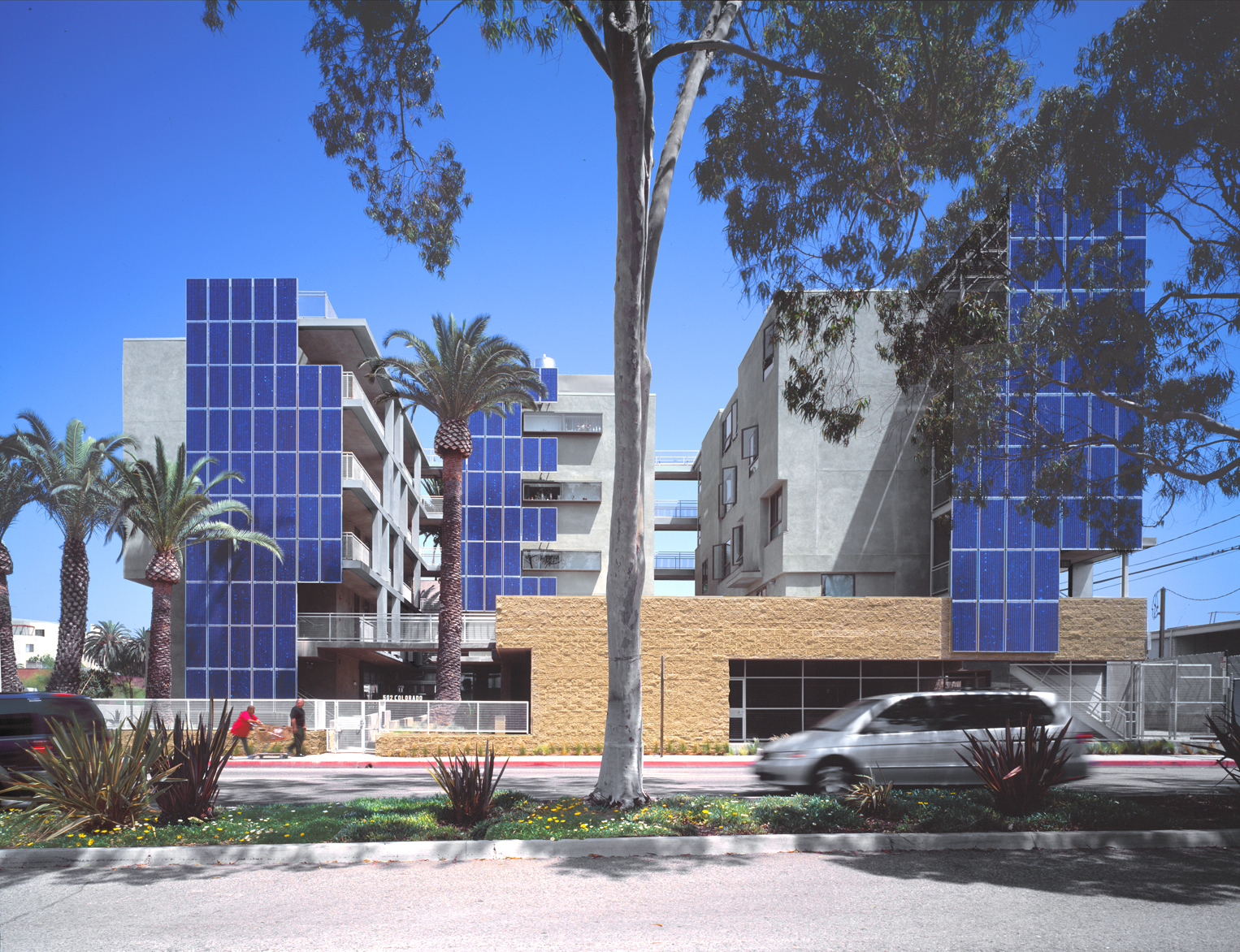
Colorado Court Affordable Housing, Santa Monica, California

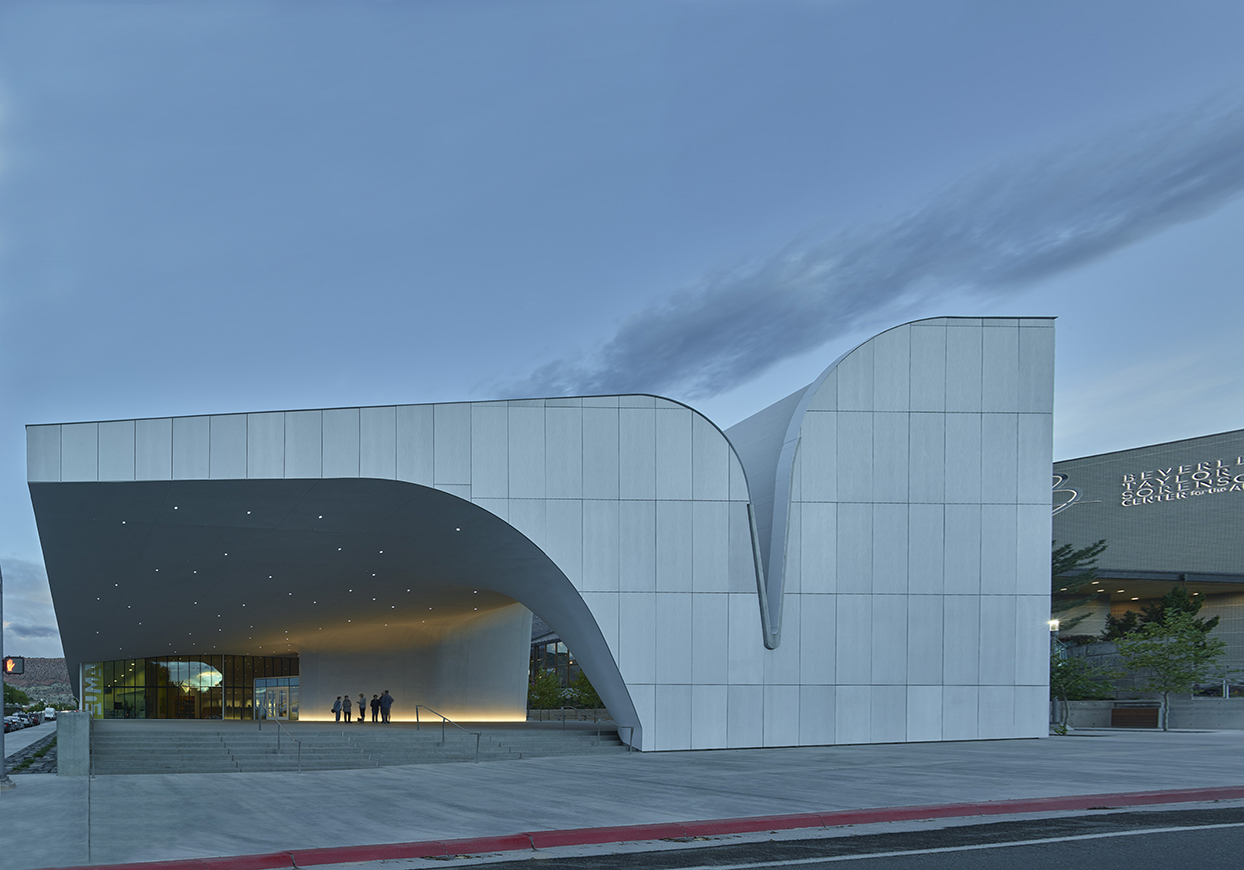
Southern Utah Museum of Art

== Significant works ==
- CAM Museum, Raleigh, North Carolina
- DC Alexander Park, Fort Lauderdale, FL
- Angle Lake Station, Seattle/Sea Tac, WA
- Metalsa Center for Manufacturing Innovation, Monterrey, Mexico
- Luxe Lakes, Chengdu, China
- Orange Grove, West Hollywood, CA (2012) - single family residence with an abstract, sculptural front facade
- Aronson Fine Arts Museum at Laumeier Sculpture Park, St. Louis, MO – A new 20,000 gsf museum and educational center located on the 105 acre Laumeier Sculpture Park
- Green Dot Animo Leadership Charter High School, Lennox, CA – A new 70,000 gsf neighborhood school with 650 solar panels. LEED gold anticipated
- Siquieros Cultural Heritage Museum, Los Angeles, CA – Renovation, addition of a Historic Structure and conservation of a mural by David Alfaro Siquieros.
- Santa Monica Public Parking Structures, Santa Monica, CA (2011) – Complete renovation of six parking structures located in downtown Santa Monica.
- Make-it-Right, New Orleans, LA (2009, unbuilt) – Participating in the rebuilding of the Lower 9th Ward with Brad Pitt.
- Plummer Park, West Hollywood, CA – A Complete renovation of the park, new 200 car parking structure, childcare center and 350 seat theatre renovation.
- Contemporary Art Museum, Raleigh, NC (2011) – A 30,000 gsf warehouse historic renovation and 8,000 gsf addition into a new Art Museum.
- Cherokee Lofts, Hollywood, CA – 35,000 gsf mixed-use live/work/commercial structure. Expected to be the first LEED platinum private building
- The Museum at Laumeier Sculpture Park, St. Louis, MO – A new 25,000 gsf free- standing museum located in the 105 acre sculpture park.
- Fuller Mixed-use Lofts, Los Angeles, CA – 105 unit market rate and for sale affordable housing including live/work, office and retail.
- Step Up, Santa Monica, CA (2009) – 46 units of housing for the mentally disabled located downtown with commercial on the ground level.
- 18th Street Arts Center, Santa Monica, CA – A new 80,000 gsf mixed-use arts complex with galleries, live/work space, theatre, offices and shop facilities.
- MGA Entertainment, Chatsworth, CA – A 350,000 gsf renovation and addition to the old LA Times printing plant into a new corporate headquarters.
- LATTC Athletic Complex, Los Angeles, CA (2008) - A 30,000 gsf renovation of a gym and physical education buildings.
- Los Angeles Community College Headquarters, Los Angeles, CA – A renovation of an 11-story office building into the LACCD District’s new home.
- Colorado Court, Santa Monica, CA (2002) - A 44 unit affordable housing project. The first LEED multi-family project in the USA. Certified LEED Gold. National AIA Design Award winner.
- Santa Monica College Student Services Center, Santa Monica, CA – A 7,500 gsf bookstore and student hub located in the center of campus.
- Bergamot Station Arts Complex, Santa Monica, CA (1999) - An 8-acre renovation and addition of an existing water heater manufacturing plant into an arts complex.
