= Lawrence Scarpa =

American architect and academic (born 1959)

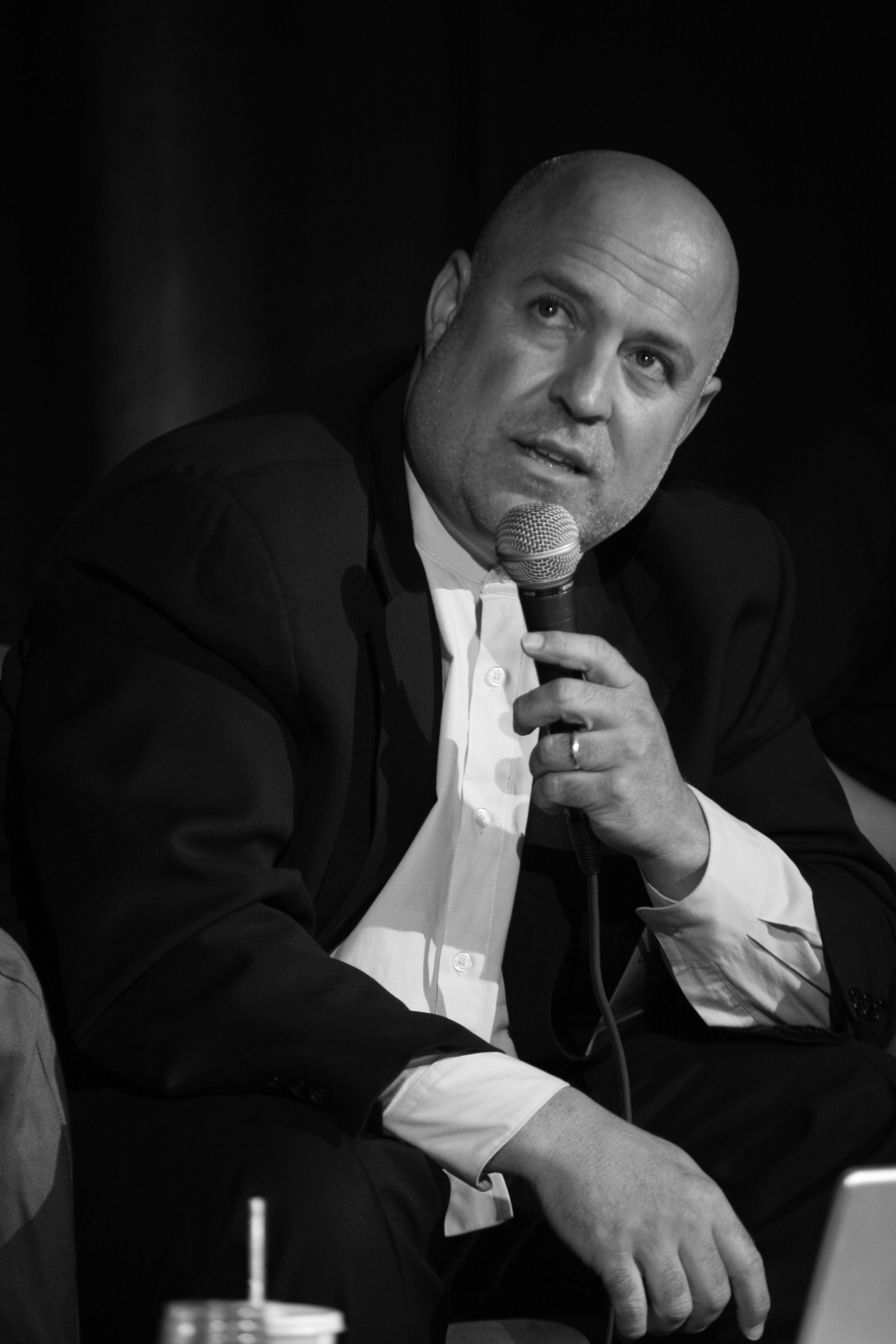
- Born: October 28, 1959 (age 66); Queens, New York, U.S.
- Education: University of Florida, Polk State College
- Occupation: Architect
- Spouse: Angela Brooks (married 1987 – present)
- Practice: Brooks + Scarpa
- Buildings: Solar Umbrella house Colorado Court; Bergamot Station
- Website: brooksscarpa.com (firm)

Lawrence Scarpa (born October 28, 1959) is an American architect and academic, based in Los Angeles, California.

He is noted for his use of conventional materials in unexpected ways and was an early proponent of sustainable design.

== Personal life ==
Scarpa was born into a Jewish-Italian family in Queens, New York. After his mother's death from cancer in 1967, the family moved to Miami, Florida.

As a child, Scarpa became interested in architecture while helping his father after school with small construction projects that his father undertook to supplement his regular income as a mailman. While on job sites with his father, Scarpa would often build little buildings made from construction debris and other small scraps of wood found there.

He is married to American architect Angela Brooks.

== Career ==
In 1976, Scarpa's father moved the family to Winter Haven, Florida, where he opened a restaurant. While working in the restaurant as a senior in high school, Scarpa befriended a regular customer named Gene Leedy, an architect and member of the Sarasota School of Architecture. Leedy soon became Scarpa's mentor. Scarpa worked for Leedy and in his father's restaurant while attending the University of Florida.

Upon graduation from the university, Scarpa moved to Boca Grande, Florida, to work for Leedy as the foreman for the construction of houses designed by Leedy. Scarpa then accepted a job and moved to New York City to work for architect Paul Rudolph where he stayed for two years until he returned to graduate school at the University of Florida in 1984.

Upon graduation from the University of Florida, he moved to Vicenza, Italy for two years before returning to the U.S. to teach at the University of Florida where he met, Angela Brooks, whom he married in 1987.

The couple moved to San Francisco and one year later relocated to Los Angeles, where they live with their one son.

In 1991, after three years of working together with architect and engineer Gwynne Pugh, the architecture firm Pugh + Scarpa was formed. In 2011, the firm name changed its name to Brooks + Scarpa to reflect the firm's leadership under Brooks and Scarpa.

== Notable career achievements ==
=== Honors and awards ===
Early in his career, Scarpa completed many projects that received the National AIA award.

In 2004, the Architectural League of New York selected Scarpa as an "Emerging Voice" in architecture.

His work has been exhibited at the National Building Museum in Washington, D.C., the Museum of Contemporary Art, Los Angeles, and at other venues worldwide. He was featured in Newsweek and in a segment on The Oprah Winfrey Show. In 2009, Interior Design magazine honored him with its Lifetime Achievement Award.

In 2010, his firm, Pugh + Scarpa, received the American Institute of Architects Firm Award, the highest award given to an architectural firm. He was also elected to be a Fellow of the American Institute of Architects in 2010.

In 2014, Brooks + Scarpa were the recipients of the Smithsonian Cooper-Hewitt National Design Museum Award in Architecture. In 2015, Scarpa received the American Institute of Architects California Council (AIACC) Lifetime Achievement Award. In 2018, he received the National American Institute of Architects Collaborative Achievement Award and the Gold Medal in Architecture from the American Institute of Architects Los Angeles Chapter.

He was the recipient of the 2022 AIA Gold Medal by the American Institute of Architects. As the institute's highest award, the Gold Medal honors an individual or pair whose significant body of work has had a lasting influence on the theory and practice of architecture.

In 2024, he received a Gold Medal in Tau Sigma Delta (an architecture honor society); the medal is presented by the Association of Collegiate Schools of Architecture.

=== Sustainability ===
Scarpa's project Colorado Court Housing in Santa Monica, California, was the first multi-family housing project in the U.S. to be LEED certified.

His Solar Umbrella house in Venice, California, has been named by the American Institute of Architects (AIA) as one of its Top Ten Green Projects.

Both Colorado Court Housing and the Solar Umbrella house and Step Up on 5th are the only projects in the history of the American Institute of Architects (AIA) to win a National AIA Design Award, an AIA "COTE" Committee on the Environment "Top Ten Green Building" Award and a National AIA special-interest award for a single project.

=== Academia ===
Scarpa is on the faculty at the University of Southern California. He has held teaching positions at several other universities for more than two decades.

In 2020, he was the William F. Stern Endowed Visiting Professor at the Hines College of Architecture at the University of Houston; the Paul Helmle Fellow at California Polytechnic University and the Regnier Visiting Professor at Kansas State University.

He was the 2014 BarberMcMurry Professor at the University of Tennessee. He was the 2012 visiting professor at the Harvard University Graduate School of Design, and in 2011 was the Jon Jerde Distinguished Professor at the University of Southern California.

He was also the 2009 E. Fay Jones Distinguished Chair in Architecture at the University of Arkansas, the 2008 Ruth and James Moore Visiting Professor at Washington University in St. Louis, the 2007 Eliel Saarinen Distinguished Professor in Architecture at the Taubman College of Architecture and Urban Planning at the University of Michigan, the 2004 Howard Friedman Fellow in Architecture at the University of California, Berkeley.

He has also taught at the University of California, Los Angeles, Southern California Institute of Architecture, University of Florida, as well as several other higher-education institutions.
