= William Wayne Caudill =

American architect

- Born: May 25, 1914; Hobart, Oklahoma
- Died: June 25, 1983 (aged 69); Houston, Texas
- Education: Oklahoma State University, Massachusetts Institute of Technology
- Occupation: Architect
- Spouse: Edith Woodman (1940-1973) Aleen Plumer Harrison (1974-his death)
- Partner(s): John Miles Rowlett, Wallie Scott, William Merriweather Peña
- Children: 2
- Parent(s): Walter and Josephine Caudill
- Awards: AIA Gold Medal 1985 (posthumous)
- Practice: Caudill Rowlett Scott
- Buildings: Central High School, San Angelo, Texas; Jones Hall, Houston; Cypress College, California; King Fahd University of Petroleum and Minerals, Dhahran, Saudi Arabia

William Wayne Caudill, FAIA (May 25, 1914 – June 25, 1983) was an American architect and professor. He was one of the founding partners of Caudill Rowlett Scott. The Chicago Tribune stated that he was known for his development of one of the world's largest architectural firms, introducing the team-based approach to architectural design, and building the School of Architecture at Rice University. Two years following his death, he was awarded the American Institute of Architects's gold medal.

== Early life and education ==
The son of Josephine Moores and Walther H. Caudill, William Wayne Caudill was born in Hobart, Oklahoma on May 25, 1914. His father owned a grocery store, where Caudill worked. In Oklahoma City, he was educated at Central High School. In 1937, Caudill graduated from Oklahoma A&M College, with a bachelor's degree in architecture. Two years later he received his master's degree in the same field from Massachusetts Institute of Technology (MIT). He developed a design for a Stillwater, Oklahoma school that was later constructed for his thesis.

== Career ==
=== Educator ===
Caudill was an educator at Texas A&M University, where he taught architecture from 1939 to 1949, except during World War II. At the Texas Engineering Station, he was a research assistant and in 1941, following the influx of students following the war, wrote Space for Teaching.

From 1961 to 1969, he was director of the School of Architecture at Rice University. For the following two years, he was a professor at the university. Among his contributions at the School of Architecture, he developed the Architecture at Rice publication series and a student intern program.

=== World War II ===
Beginning in 1942, he served in the Army Corps of Engineers. He served in the Navy beginning in 1944 and into 1945. (Note: Texas A&M stated that he began serving the Navy in 1943.)

=== Architect ===
Caudill was a founding partner of an architectural firm with John M. Rowlett in 1946. Two years later, Wallie E. Scott became the third partner and the organization name was changed to Caudill Rowlett Scott (CRS). William Merriweather Peña became a partner in 1949. One of the country's largest architectural organizations, it designed houses, schools, hospitals, churches, and commercial and public buildings. Originally located in College Station, the firm was ultimately located in Houston. Caudill introduced a team-based approach to architectural design at the firm.

Notable buildings included elementary schools in Washington, Parkside, Northside, and Houston, which were listed on the National Register of Historic Places. His firm is noted for its work on school designs, beginning with a building constructed in Blackwell, Oklahoma. It expanded to also have engineering and construction divisions and became a public corporation.

He was a member of the American Institute of Architects, became a fellow in 1962, and served on its board of directors. In 1985, following his death, he was awarded the Gold Medal of AIA; he was the first architect from Texas to receive the award.

In the 1960s, he was a member of the Advisory Panel on Architectural Services of the General Services Administration and Advisory Committee on New Educational Media of the Department of Health, Education, and Welfare. He was a United States Energy Research and Development Ad-Hoc Commission member. From 1974 to 1977, he was an architectural consultant on foreign buildings to the Department of State.

=== Author and speaker ===
He wrote more than 80 articles and 12 books on architecture. He was also a frequent public speaker. His books include Space for Teaching (1941), Architecture by Team (1971) and The TIBs of Bill Caudill (1984).

== Personal life ==
In 1940, he married Edith Roselle Woodman, with whom they had two children. In 1973, Edith died and Caudill was married a second time in 1974 a friend from Oklahoma A&M College, Aleen Plumer Harrison. He died on June 25, 1983, in Houston.
