= Chrysler World Headquarters and Technology Center =

Office building in Michigan, United States

- Interactive map of the Chrysler World Headquarters and Technology Center area

General information
- Type: Office/R&D
- Location: 1000 Chrysler Drive, Auburn Hills, Michigan, United States
- Coordinates: 42°39′15.7″N 83°14′1″W
- Completed: 1993 (Technology Center); 1996 (Headquarters)
- Owner: Stellantis North America

Height
- Roof: 249 ft (76 m)

Technical details
- Floor count: 15
- Floor area: 5,400,000 sq ft (500,000 m^{2})

Design and construction
- Architects: CRSS Inc. (Technology Center); SmithGroup (Headquarters)

The Chrysler World Headquarters and Technology Center (CTC) is the headquarters and main research and development facility for the automobile manufacturer Stellantis North America, formerly known as Chrysler Corporation. The 504-acre (204 ha) complex is located next to Interstate 75 in Auburn Hills, Michigan, a northern suburb of Detroit. The complex has 5,400,000 square feet (500,000 m^{2}) of usable space, making it one of the largest buildings in the United States by floor space. Completed between 1993 and 1996 for the Chrysler Corporation, the building has followed the company as it changed hands several times since, serving as the North American headquarters for DaimlerChrysler, Fiat Chrysler Automobiles (FCA) and now Stellantis North America.

== History ==
Before moving to the Auburn Hills headquarters, Chrysler was based at the Highland Park Chrysler Plant campus, which predated the formation of the company itself. It was located along I-75, roughly one mile (1.6 km) southeast of the Highland Park Ford Plant.

The idea for the Chrysler Technology Center was credit to Jack Gleason of Facilities, who started a small team to explore the idea in 1982. The team was formally established in 1984, a set of formal guidelines, specifications, and program desires written in June 1985, and construction started in the fall of 1986. The facility was largely complete upon its dedication on October 15, 1991, and it reached full occupancy in 1993. During construction, a new exit with direct access to the complex was added to I-75.

On September 9, 1992, Chrysler announced that they would move their headquarters from the Highland Park complex to a new office tower at the Technology Center. Ground was broken on the 15-floor expansion in 1993, and it was completed in 1996.

The Walter P. Chrysler Museum, opened in October 1999, was also located on the CTC campus. The museum closed in 2012. It reopened, with reduced hours, in 2016, and closed permanently in December that year. Chrysler then converted the museum building to office space, and it currently houses the US headquarters of Maserati and Alfa Romeo. Most of the vehicles from the museum were moved to an FCA facility in Detroit formerly used as a factory for the production of the Dodge Viper, but have not been on public display since.

Since the mid-2000s, Chrysler has regularly wrapped the west side of the tower with large advertisements for the company's vehicles, visible to motorists passing the complex on Interstate 75.

Stellantis also maintains offices at the historic Chrysler House in downtown Detroit.

== Design ==
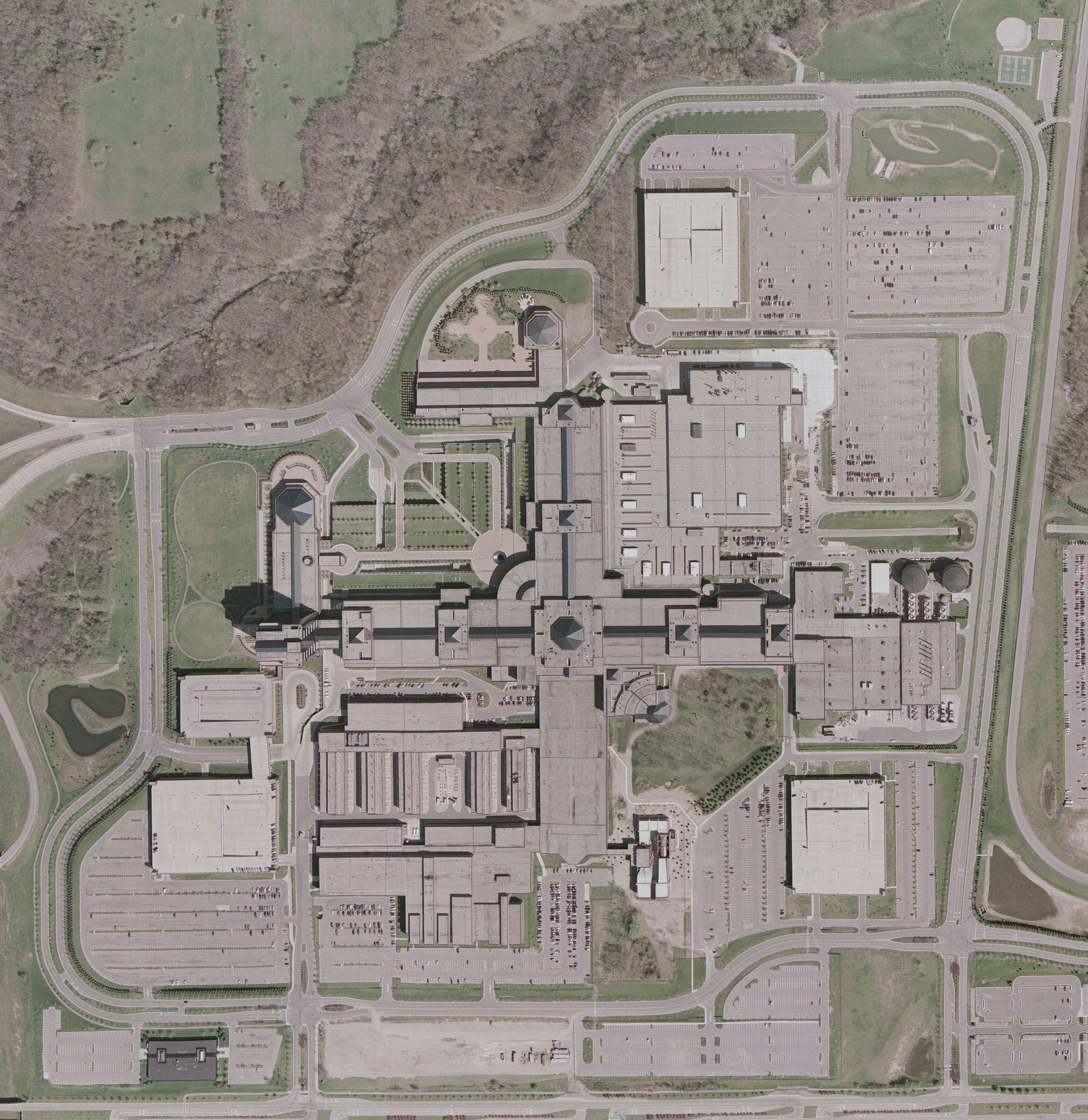
Aerial view of the complex. The shadow of the 15-story headquarters tower can be seen at the left end of the cross-shaped Technology Center building.

CRSS Architects (Note: Caudill Rowlett Scott known as (CRS-Sirrine) and (CRSS) of Houston, Texas, was succeeded by the Jacobs Engineering Group of Pasadena, California.) designed the Chrysler World Headquarters and Technology Center in a cross-axial formation where its elongated atrium topped concourses converge with an octagonal radiant skylight at its center.

A team including noted project leader Chris Theodore used the cross-axial formation to reinforce the company’s cross-functional team approach as the CTC was being built; they arranged for each car’s engineers and designers to be in one place while still keeping functional units as intact as possible.

The tower, designed by SmithGroup, features a massive 35-foot (11 m) tall window at the top shaped like the company's five-pointed Pentastar logo. The rounded-off exterior corners of the tower are meant to evoke a polished car body. At 249 feet (76 m) tall, it is the tallest building in the city of Auburn Hills.

The facility includes a full laboratory level with various wind tunnels, a 1.8-mile (2.9 km) evaluation road, noise, vibration, and harshness testing facility, electromagnetic compatibility center, climatic wind tunnel (able to create rain, snow, and extreme temperatures), and pilot production plant. A 57,000 square feet (5,300 m^{2}) training center was included from the start, with a teleconferencing center and fitness center. The basement hallways are large enough for two cars to pass each other, allowing some testing within the building; and the test cells have their own separate foundation, to avoid vibrating the rest of the complex.

During the automotive industry crisis of 2008–2010, some automotive news sites reported that the complex was designed to be converted to a shopping mall. This theory was later disproved, based on mall industry analysis and speculation from local real estate investors.

== See also ==
- Chrysler House
- Lee Iacocca
- List of largest buildings in the world
- Sergio Marchionne
- Walter P. Chrysler
- History of Chrysler
