= Jones Hall =

Performance hall in Houston, Texas

Jones Hall for the Performing Arts
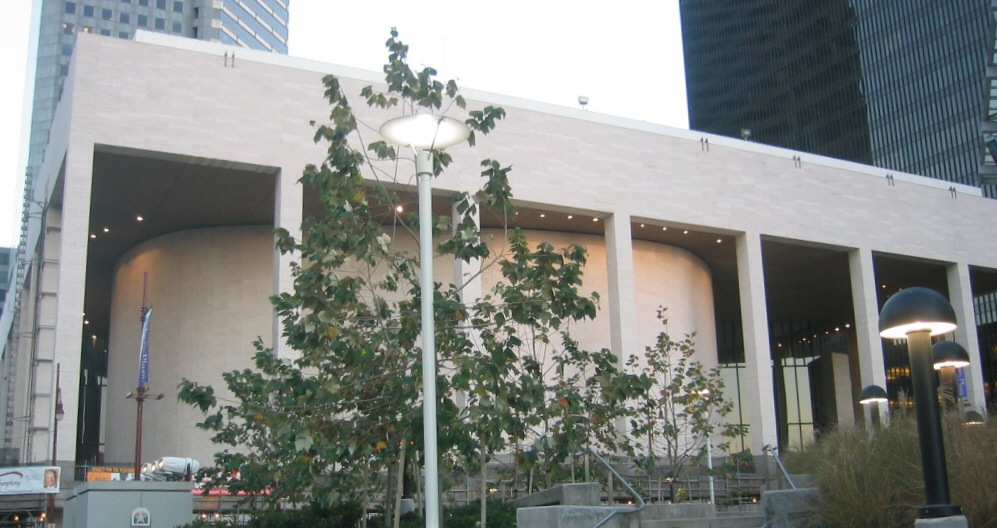

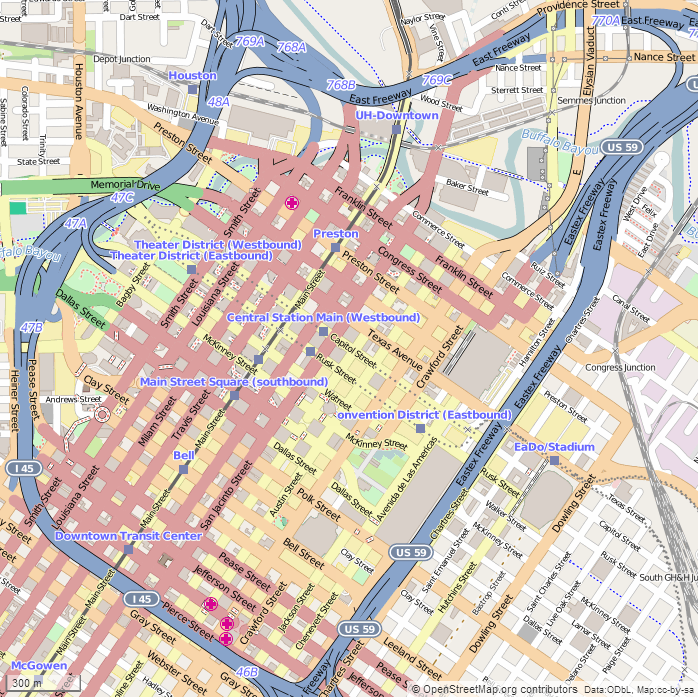
- Location within Downtown Houston
- Address: 615 Louisiana St; Houston, TX 77002-2715
- Location: Downtown Houston
- Coordinates: 29°45′39″N 95°21′54″W
- Owner: City of Houston (operated by the Houston First Corporation)
- Capacity: 2,912

Construction
- Opened: October 2, 1966
- Renovated: 2003
- Cost: $7.4 million ($78.8 million in 2025 dollars) $24 million (2003 renovations) ($43.6 million in 2025 dollars)
- Architect: William Wayne Caudill

Website
- Venue Info

The Jesse H. Jones Hall for the Performing Arts (commonly known as Jones Hall) is a performance venue in Houston, Texas, and the permanent home of the Houston Symphony Orchestra and Society for the Performing Arts. Jones Hall is also frequently rented as a venue for contemporary pop musicians and other performers and is estimated to draw over 400,000 audience members yearly.

== History ==
Officially completed on October 2, 1966, at the cost of $7.4 million, it is named after Jesse H. Jones, a former United States Secretary of Commerce and Houstonian. (For the hall's opening concert a special work was commissioned of the American composer Alan Hovhaness entitled 'Ode to the Temple of Sound'). Construction of the hall was underwritten by Houston Endowment, Inc., a foundation endowed by Jones and his wife Mary Gibbs Jones. Upon completion, the hall was donated to the city, and today is operated by the Houston First Corporation.

Designed by the Houston-based architectural firm Caudill Rowlett Scott, the hall, which occupies an entire city block, features a white Italian marble exterior with eight-story tall columns. The interior includes a basement and a sub-basement which houses a rehearsal room. The lobby is dominated by a 60-foot (18 m) high ceiling featuring a massive hanging bronze sculpture by Richard Lippold entitled "Gemini II". The inside of the concert hall itself is unique in that the ceiling is made of 800 hexagonal segments which can be raised or lowered to change the acoustics of the hall. The segments can actually be lowered enough to close the upper balcony, so the seating capacity therefore fluctuates from about 2,300 with the balcony covered to 2,911 with the balcony open. The building won the 1967 American Institute of Architects' Honor Award, which is bestowed on only one building annually.

The acoustics were designed by the firm Bolt, Beranek and Newman, who also designed New York City's Avery Fisher Hall and San Francisco's Louise M. Davies Symphony Hall. However, the only renovations since the hall's construction have been unrelated. In 1993, it was renovated to bring it in accordance with the Americans with Disabilities Act. From 2001 to 2003, a $28 million renovation took place to reaffix marble panels which had begun to fall from the building's exterior façade, to renovate parts of the building that had been flooded during 2001's Tropical Storm Allison, and to remove asbestos from the interior.
