= Gwynne Pugh =

American architect

Gwynne Pugh is an American architect, born in Wales, who until 2010 was a partner of Pugh + Scarpa. He is known for his use of environmentally sound architecture and alternative energy in his designs. In 2010, he was inducted into the AIA College of Fellows. Currently, he is principal of Gwynne Pugh Urban Studio, a firm he founded in 2010.

== Early life ==
Born in Cardiff, Wales, Pugh was raised in Greece and Turkey. Pugh has been practicing architecture, planning, civil, structural and design engineering since 1971. He earned his Bachelor of Science in engineering degree at the University of Leeds and his Master of Architecture degree from UCLA.

== Career ==
Pugh began his career at Posford Pavry & Partners, a London engineering firm. After completing his architectural engineering degree at the University of Leeds, Pugh moved to the United States to study architecture at UCLA, where he earned his Master of Architecture. He then worked in the LA Area for several years before forming his own small firm in 1984: Gwynne Pugh AIA & Associates. Here he established his reputation as an expert in construction, engineering, and design. He completed a variety of projects, ranging from bridges, to residential remodels, to a Disneyland hotel. In 1988, Pugh hired Lawrence Scarpa. Three years later they decided to become partners, changing their practice to Pugh + Scarpa. The two operated as principals for the entity until 2010, when they split up to pursue separate design interests.

Pugh is very involved in the local California community with his work in architecture, urban design, and consulting. He is the past Chair of the Santa Monica Planning Commission and serves as a consultant to the city.

He has served as a consultant to other cities in California, including Long Beach and Carson. He is an LEED-Accredited Professional and is considered an expert on sustainable design and engineering.

== Sustainable Design ==
Pugh has more than a decade of experience on a wide variety of sustainable projects. As senior principal at Pugh Scarpa Kodama (a collaboration between Pugh + Scarpa and Kodama Diseno), the firm designed the Colorado Court affordable housing project in downtown Santa Monica. This building was the first building of its type in the country to be energy neutral and the first of its kind to receive an LEED Gold rating. The Project has received numerous awards since its completion in 2002, including the 2003 AIA Cote 'Top Ten Green Building' Award, National Housing Award, and the 2003 National AIA Design Award. Other major sustainable projects Pugh has been involved in throughout his career include: the Lofts at Cherokee Studio, Step Up on Fifth, Bergamot Station Arts Complex and Artists' Lofts, Siquieros Mural, and the Rosa Parks multi-family housing complex.

== Community ==
Pugh is very involved in the local California community, including serving as past Chair of the Santa Monica Planning Commission. Under his watch, the Commission updated the Land Use & Circulation Element to generate a new code for the City that will encourage design excellence in future developments and provide benefit to the community. Pugh also has experience working with local community groups and public and private agencies, serving as a Peer Review Consultant to the city of Carson, the City of Los Angeles, and the Getty Conservation Institute. Additionally, he previously served on the California Redevelopment Association on Sustainability and Green Redevelopment.

Currently, he serves on the board of directors for AIA|LA.

== Urban Studio ==
In 2010, Pugh left Pugh + Scarpa, the firm he co-founded and built, to form his new enterprise, Gwynne Pugh Urban Studio (GP-US). He founded GP-US out of his desire to explore urban design and interact more with cities. His company focuses on architectural and urban design services, in addition to urban planning and consulting services to both private companies and public entities.

Gwynne Pugh Urban Studio is based in Santa Monica and is well noted in the press for its tenant improvement project for a high-profile animation studio in Santa Monica. Along with Andy Waisler, Pugh completed an adaptive reuse of a 1940s bowstring and brick warehouse. This project won special mention in the Architecture + Workspace category of Architizer's A+ Awards and has appeared in numerous print and online publications.

Currently, Pugh is focusing on urban design, with interest in how public architecture and developer architecture interact in the built environment. As an architect, he believes in involvement and curiosity about the environment, and not only experimenting with the urban fabric and design, but also doing so in a manner that makes sense in the context of a project's surroundings. He went into architecture with a determination to create transformative work, not from the singular perspective of creating objects to be admired, but from a philosophical perspective that actively incorporates sustainable and urban principles into architecture and integrates architecture into the fabric of our daily lives.

In the future, he looks to expand more into interacting with various cities. In an interview with Residential Architect, he notes, "What's really interesting is this place in between planning and architecture. I'm trying to see how cities can maximize what they've got, how they can contribute to the life of the city. Before things are cast in stone, there can be a real discussion about how they can set about that and become more of an interactive place."

== Notable works ==
- Santa Monica Animation Studio, Santa Monica, CA. Project by Gwynne Pugh Urban Studio.
- Step Up on Firth, Santa Monica, CA. Project by Pugh + Scarpa.
- Siquieros Mural, Los Angeles, CA. Project by Pugh + Scarpa.
- Bergamot Station, Santa Monica, CA. Project by Pugh + Scarpa.

== Awards and honors ==
- Interior Design Hall of Fame, Inducted 2008
- American Institute of Architects, College of Fellows, 2010
- 2010 AIA National Firm of the Year Award (with Pugh + Scarpa)
- American Institute of Architects, Firm of the Year - Pugh + Scarpa, 2010
