= Caudill Rowlett Scott =

Architecture firm in Houston, Texas

Caudill Rowlett Scott (CRS)
- CRS building, called the "White House", in Houston, Texas
- Type: Architecture firm
- Founded: 1946
- Founder: John Rowlett; William Wayne Caudill
- Defunct: 1994
- Fate: Acquired by HOK
- Successor: CRSS or CRS-Sirrine
- Headquarters: Houston, Texas, United States
- Key people: William Wayne Caudill; John Miles Rowlett; Wallie Eugene Scott; Willie Peña Jr.; Thomas Abbott Bullock Sr.
- Services: Architectural design, specializing in schools, commercial buildings, and skyscrapers

Caudill Rowlett Scott (CRS) was an architecture firm founded in Houston, Texas, the United States in 1946. In 1983, J.E. Sirrine, an industrial engineering firm, merged with the company and the company's name was changed to CRSS, popularly known as CRS-Sirrine. It divested itself in 1994.

== History ==
The firm was started in 1946 by Texas A&M University professors William Wayne Caudill and John Miles Rowlett (1914–1978), first in Austin, Texas and soon after were located in College Station, Texas. The partners were joined in 1948 by Wallie Eugene Scott Jr. (1921–1989), who was Caudill's student. William Merriweather Peña, another student of Caudill's was hired in 1948. He was the first employee and in 1949, he was made a partner. He expressed that it would be best to keep the company name with the first three partners names rather than extending it with each new partner. In 1954, Thomas A. Bullock Sr. (1922–2007) became a partner.

In the 1950s, they were known for building schools, with a "lean and clean" style. The schools, generally one-story, had simple designs with classrooms on one side of a corridor, maximization of windows for lighting and ventilation, and shed, flat, or gabled roofs. In San Angelo, Texas, the Central High School was constructed with an open design, having 13 buildings on a campus. It was the first fully air-conditioned school in the country. Using the outdoors as an aesthetic, they designed a glass-walled and domed gymnasium in Brownsville, Texas for St. Josephs Academy. The editor of ArchitectureWeek stated that "they became known as masters of modern practice and construction management." In 1958, CRS moved their office to Houston from Bryan, Texas. They began designing hospitals and had designed school and university buildings in eight countries and 26 states by 1969.

The firm relied on research, including studies and surveys that they conducted, such as with the Texas A&M Engineering Experiment Station (TEES) Architecture Division, as well as the publications that they produced. For instance, Caudill authored the book Toward Better School Design. This involved the programming and designing business practice documented and promoted by William "Willie" Peña in Problem Seeking: An architectural programming primer in 1969 with a CRS programmer, John Focke. Its concepts were incorporated into the National Council of Architectural Registration Boards (NCARB) in 1973, and it has become a standard architecture textbook.

Over the years, it developed a national reputation and also had international clients. It opened regional offices and the six partner firm employed 250 employees. It became a public corporation, CRS Design Associates, Inc. in 1970 and had added engineering and construction divisions. It was listed on the American Stock Exchange in 1971. During the 1970s the firm became known for prestigious projects in the Middle East, including Saudi University of Petroleum and Minerals (now known as King Fahd University of Petroleum and Minerals) in Dhahran, which is notable for its contemporary Islamic design, and Riyadh University. The firm was also active in Kuwait and elsewhere in the Gulf States.

In 1983, J.E. Sirrine, an industrial engineering firm, became part of the company and the company's name was changed to CRSS, popularly known as CRS-Sirrine. The Sirrine arm of the firm continued to pursue engineering work, much of it in the pulp and paper industry, while the architecture group continued to focus primarily on architecture-related work.

Eventually, the corporation also developed a core group which focused on businesses related to both architecture and industrial engineering. CRS Capital became involved in reinsurance for A/E-related firms and became involved in development of power-generation facilities. In 1994, a few years after the death of Scott, CRSS began divesting itself, selling off the architectural group to HOK of St. Louis and the Sirrine engineering division to Jacobs Engineering Group of Pasadena, California.

== Selected architecture projects ==
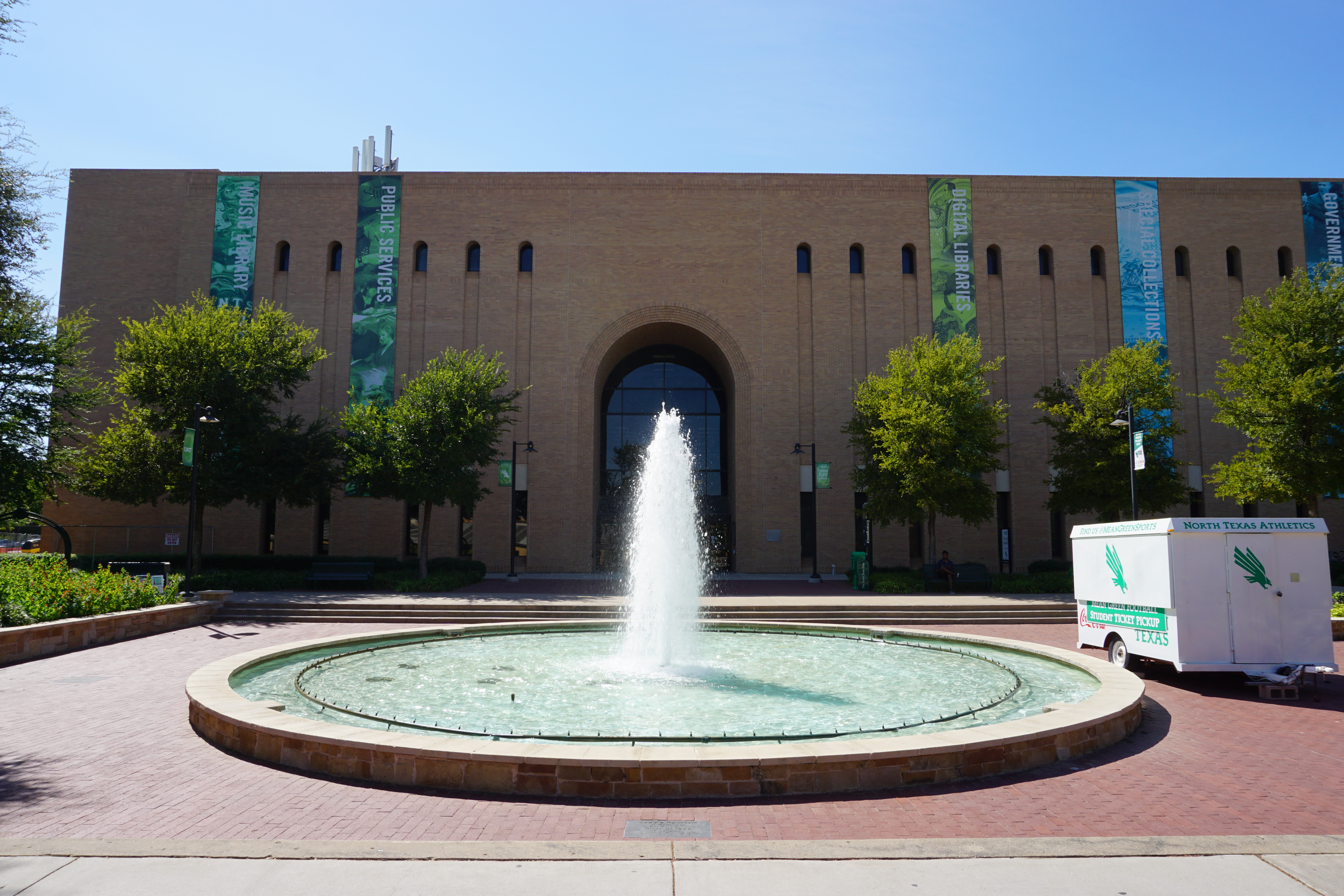
Willis Library, University of North Texas, Denton (1971)

Texas

- Jones Hall, Houston (1966)
- Albert Thomas Convention Center, now Bayou Place, Houston (1967)
- Texas Pavilion for HemisFair '68; now Institute of Texan Cultures, San Antonio (1968)
- Willis Library, University of North Texas, Denton (1971)
- Houston Center, Houston (1978)
- 1177 West Loop South, Houston (1978)
- Fulbright Tower, Houston (1982)

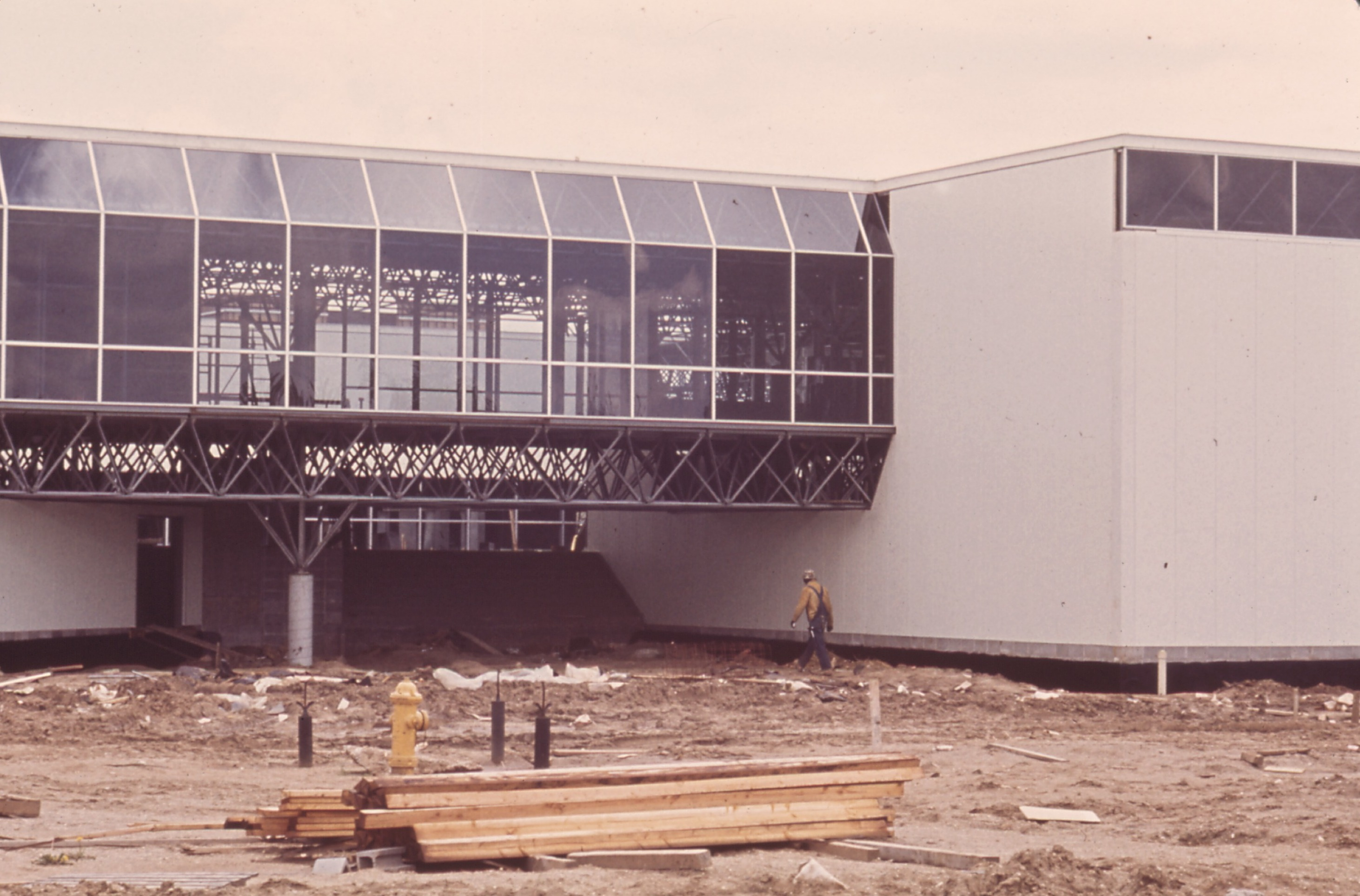
Fodrea Community School, designed by Caudill, Rowlett, and Scott, during construction

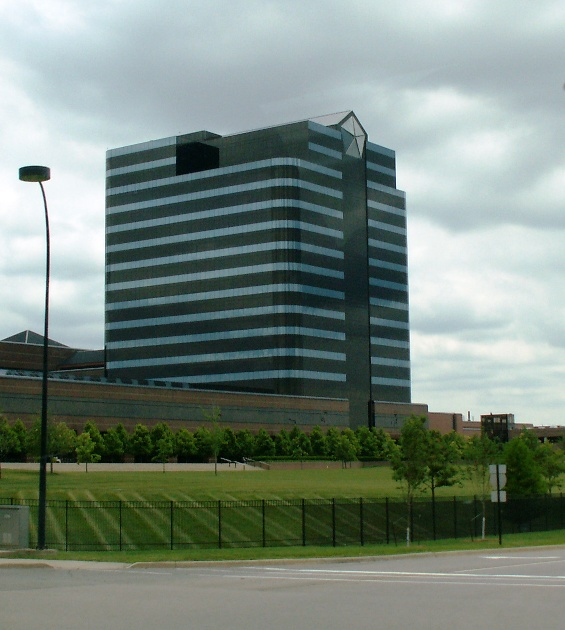
FCA US LLC Headquarters and Technology Center

Continental U.S.

- Olin Hall of Science, Colorado College, Colorado Springs, Colorado (1961), received Awards of Merit from two Texas chapters of the American Institute of Architects (AIA)
- Abington High School North Campus in Abington, PA (1964).
- Public School 219, the "dome school", in Queens, New York (1964 design)
- Roy E. Larsen Hall at Harvard University, Cambridge, Massachusetts (1965)
- Roslyn High School alterations, in Roslyn Heights, New York (1967)
- Cypress College in Cypress, California (1970)
- Pima Community College West Campus, Tucson, Arizona (1973)
- Salanter Akiba Riverdale Academy, in the Bronx, New York (1974)
- Tulane Medical Center, New Orleans, Louisiana (1976)
- Aggie Memorial Stadium, New Mexico State University, Las Cruces, New Mexico (1978)
- Towers on the Park North, New York (1988)
- Towers on the Park Southwest, New York (1988)
- Chrysler Headquarters and Technology Center in Auburn Hills, Michigan (1993)

International

- University of Petroleum and Minerals, Dhahran, Saudi Arabia (c. 1974)
- Ruwais Housing Complex, Abu Dhabi, United Arab Emirates

== Awards ==
In 1972, CRS Architects received the Architecture Firm Award, the highest award of the American Institute of Architects.

In 1975, the firm was given the prestigious Albert S. Bard Award for their design of the Salanter Akiba Riverdale Academy.

In 2005, it was named "Firm of the Century" by Texas A&M University College of Architecture (in which the CRS Center is now housed).
