= William Merriweather Peña =

American architect

William Merriweather Peña (February 10, 1919 – February 10, 2018) was an American architect and partner of Caudill Rowlett Scott. He is known for being a leading proponent in the area of architectural programming. A U.S. Army veteran from World War II, he received a Bronze Star Medal and Purple Heart.

== Early life ==
Peña was born on February 10, 1919, in Laredo, Texas, where his father Eduardo F. Peña was a grocer. He attended St. Augustine Catholic School in the city and in 1937 he graduated from Laredo High School. He was a Boy Scout and in high school he was president of the Pan American Student Club and co-editor of The Journal, the school paper.

Prior to World War II, he was a student at Texas A&M University. In 1941, he was a junior, wearing a military uniform in his class picture and was identified as an Intelligence Sergeant. He graduated with a bachelor's degree on May 16, 1942.

== World War II ==
On May 17, 1942, Peña was commissioned as a Second Lieutenant in the United States Army and entered officer training. In September 1944, he was sent to Europe. In December 1944 he fought at the Battle of the Bulge. He was one of 20,000 soldiers from Texas A&M University at the battle in the Ardennes forest of France, Luxembourg, and Belgium. A captain, he was one of the nearly 15,000 officers from A&M at the Battle of the Bulge.

He was near Schleiden, Germany in March 1945, repairing a communications line, when a landmine explosion resulted in the loss of his leg. He returned to the United States, receiving treatment at an Army hospital in Utah and a hospital in San Francisco. During that time, he developed an interest in classical music. He was awarded a Bronze Star Medal and Purple Heart.

Belgium developed the idea for the "From Texas to Bastogne: Texas Aggies Go to War" exhibit for the 70th anniversary of the battle. The interactive exhibit that honors the soldiers and features five specific soldiers, including Peña, was located in 16 rooms of an old convent in Bastogne, Belgium for two years before being moved to College Station, Texas, in 2016. The Mardasson Memorial at Bastogne displays a "large-scale, outdoor dramatization of the exhibit".

He was also one of the veterans recognized at the Texas A&M Hispanic Network (TAMHN) Summit of 2015. He wrote a memoir of his war experiences, As Far As Schleiden.

== Career ==
External images
- William Merriweather Peña, as a young man
- Ed Nye, Wallie Scott, and Willie Peña at CRS in 1957

In 1948, he earned a master's degree in architecture from Texas A&M University. One of his teachers was William Wayne Caudill. Peña's master project was a design for an elementary school, which was used as an initial design by the firm for the construction of the school for the Blackwell, Oklahoma school district and the beginning of the approach to finely define the requirements for actual design work that involved "squatting" with the client until the specifications were clear. It was the first school for the firm that built its name on designing schools.

Peña, hired by Caudill in 1948, was the first employee of the Caudill Rowlett Scott (CRS) architectural firm. In 1949, he was made a partner, but expressed that it would be best to keep the company name with the first three partners names rather than extending it with each new partner. By 1954, he wrote two articles about school architecture with Caudill, "What Characterizes a Good School Building" for The School Executive and "Color in the Classroom" for the Journal of the Royal Architectural Institute of Canada.

This method, developed by Pena in the 1960s and published in 1969, had its roots in the post war building boom that was taking place in the United States at the time. The Problem Seeking method was a means of establishing order and control over a system that had grown increasingly complex during the twenty years following the war. Simply put, it was a means of systematizing architectural knowledge.

— Frank Jacobus, The Disappearing Architect: 21st Century Practice and the Rise of Intelligent Machines

He promoted the concept of architectural programming where considerations, materials, goals, and a problem statement were formulated by analysts or programmers, which were to be solved by the architects. It has been defined as "a process that provides the general direction a building's design should take after the client's goals and needs are determined". He wrote the first edition of Problem Seeking: An architectural programming primer in 1969 with a CRS programmer, John Focke, to document the process. Its concepts were incorporated into the National Council of Architectural Registration Boards (NCARB) in 1973 and the third edition written with Kevin Kelly and Steven Parshall was published by the American Institute of Architects (AIA) in 1987. The book is now a standard architecture textbook.

In 1978, the book he co-authored with William Wayne Caudill and Paul Kennon, Architecture and You: How to Experience and Enjoy Building was published.

He was a Fellow of the American Institute of Architects. As of 2015, he continued to work as an architect.

== Personal life ==
He lived in Houston, Texas and visited Europe after the war. He was the Music Arts Guild program chairman in his city. He died on February 10, 2018, on his 99th birthday.

== Awards and honors ==
External image
- William Merriweather Peña with Princess Astrid of Belgium

- 1948 – Outstanding Student of Architecture, school medal of the American Institute of Architects, Texas A&M University
- 1998 – Outstanding Alumnus of the Texas A&M College of Architecture.
- 2013 – Consulate General of France, Surijo Seam, presented the Legion of Honour in Houston at Minute Maid Park on Veterans Day.
- 2015 – Distinguished Alumnus Award, Texas A&M University.
- 2016 – Princess Astrid of Belgium presented the Commander in the Order of the Crown on December 7, 2016.

== Sources ==
- Jonathan King; Philip Langdon (2002). The CRS Team and the Business of Architecture. Texas A&M University Press. ISBN 978-1-58544-206-5.
