= Solar Umbrella house =

Private residence in Venice, Los Angeles

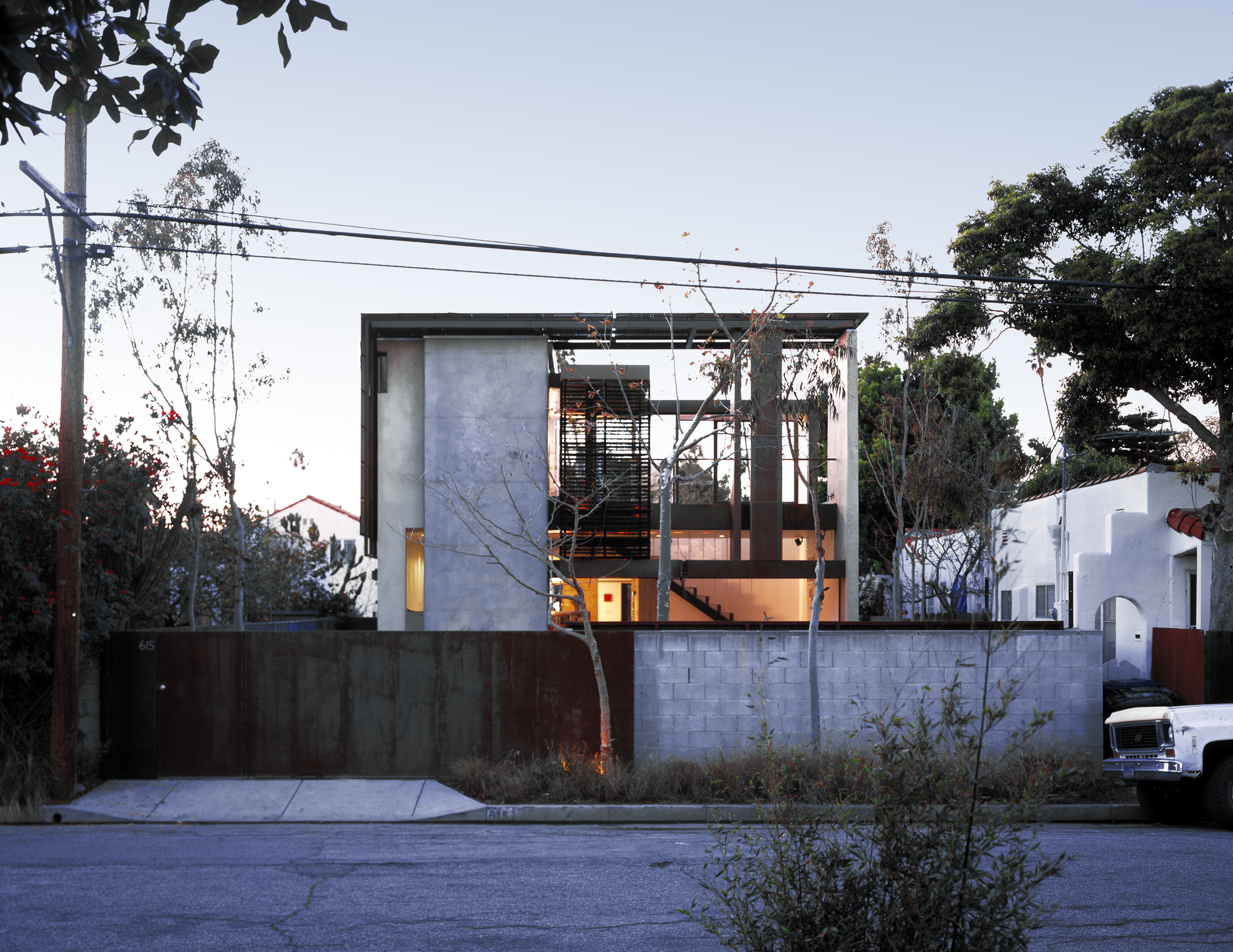
Solar Umbrella as seen from Woodlawn Ave

The Solar Umbrella House is a private residence in Venice, Los Angeles, California, remodeled using active and passive solar design strategies to enable the house to function independent of the electrical grid. The design was inspired by Paul Rudolph’s 1953 Umbrella House for Philip Hanson Hiss III's Lido Shores, Sarasota, development. Originally a small 650-square-foot (60 m^{2}) bungalow, the owners added 1,150 sq ft (107 m^{2}) in 2005, remodeling it in such a way that the house is almost 100% energy neutral.

== The building ==
Inspired by Paul Rudolph's Umbrella House of 1953, the Solar Umbrella House produces 95% of its electricity from solar energy. The American Institute of Architects listed it as a top-ten green project for 2006. Designed by award-winning architects Lawrence Scarpa and Angela Brooks of the architecture firm Brooks + Scarpa., The Solar Umbrella House establishes a precedent for the next generation of California modernist architecture. Passive and active solar design strategies render the residence nearly 100% energy neutral.

Richard Koshalek, former President of Art Center College in Pasadena and current Director of the Hirshhorn Museum in Washington, DC, considers Solar Umbrella an important house at a critical time. “A new generation of architects is intent on environmentally sustainable designs,” he said, “and Mr. Scarpa and Ms. Brooks-along with Thom Mayne and others-are at the forefront of this optimistic trend.”

The Solar Umbrella House is an extension of an initial remodel of a 1920s bungalow. Conserving the original form of the bungalow, Scarpa and Brooks took advantage of the "through lot" condition of the site, reversing the front and back of the house. This strategy allows the house to gain its needed southern exposure for the solar array while also connecting the living area with the back garden space. The result is a contrasting expression with the entry facade of the solar array facing one street, and the more quiet and modest original structure facing the other street.

The organizing principles of the house hinge on the blurring and extension of inside to outside, such strategies create dynamic ways to experience and incorporate the entire environment. A simple but elegant concrete swimming pool cascades along the garden's western edge, linking the outdoor garden to the house. The living room has large sliding glass doors that open out onto the garden, literally erasing the boundary of inside and out. The canopy of solar panels provides a covered space from which the garden below can be viewed from the second floor.

== Environmental aspects ==
Passively adapted to the temperate-arid climate of southern California, the major design feature of the Solar Umbrella is a shading solar canopy. Rather than deflecting sunlight, this contemporary solar canopy uses 89 amorphous photovoltaic panels to transform the sunlight into usable energy, providing 95% of the residence's electricity. At the same time, it screens large portions of the structure from direct exposure to the intense southern California sun, protecting the body of the building from thermal heat gain. A net meter provided by the City of Los Angeles connects the photovoltaic array to the grid, eliminating both the need for a storage system and the time-of-use charges associated with traditional electricity use.

An integrated solar heating system supplies heat through the concrete floors of the new addition. Three solar hot-water panels preheat the domestic hot water, and a fourth heats the swimming pool. The home's daylit interior requires no electric lighting on sunny days. The house is outfitted with energy-efficient appliances and both interior and exterior lighting-control systems. Materials were selected based on their effects on the environment and indoor air quality.

== Awards and honors ==
- AIA Los Angeles Chapter, Special "Decade Award" in 2007
- National AIA Honor Awards for Architecture in 2007
- National AIA/COTE Top Ten Green Projects in 2006
- National AIA Housing PIA Award in 2006; Category: Innovation in Housing Design
- Record Houses, Architectural Record in 2005
- AIA Design Award, California Chapter in 2005
- Building Design & Construction Magazine Design Award in 2005
- AIA Los Angeles Chapter Design Award in 2005

== Gallery ==
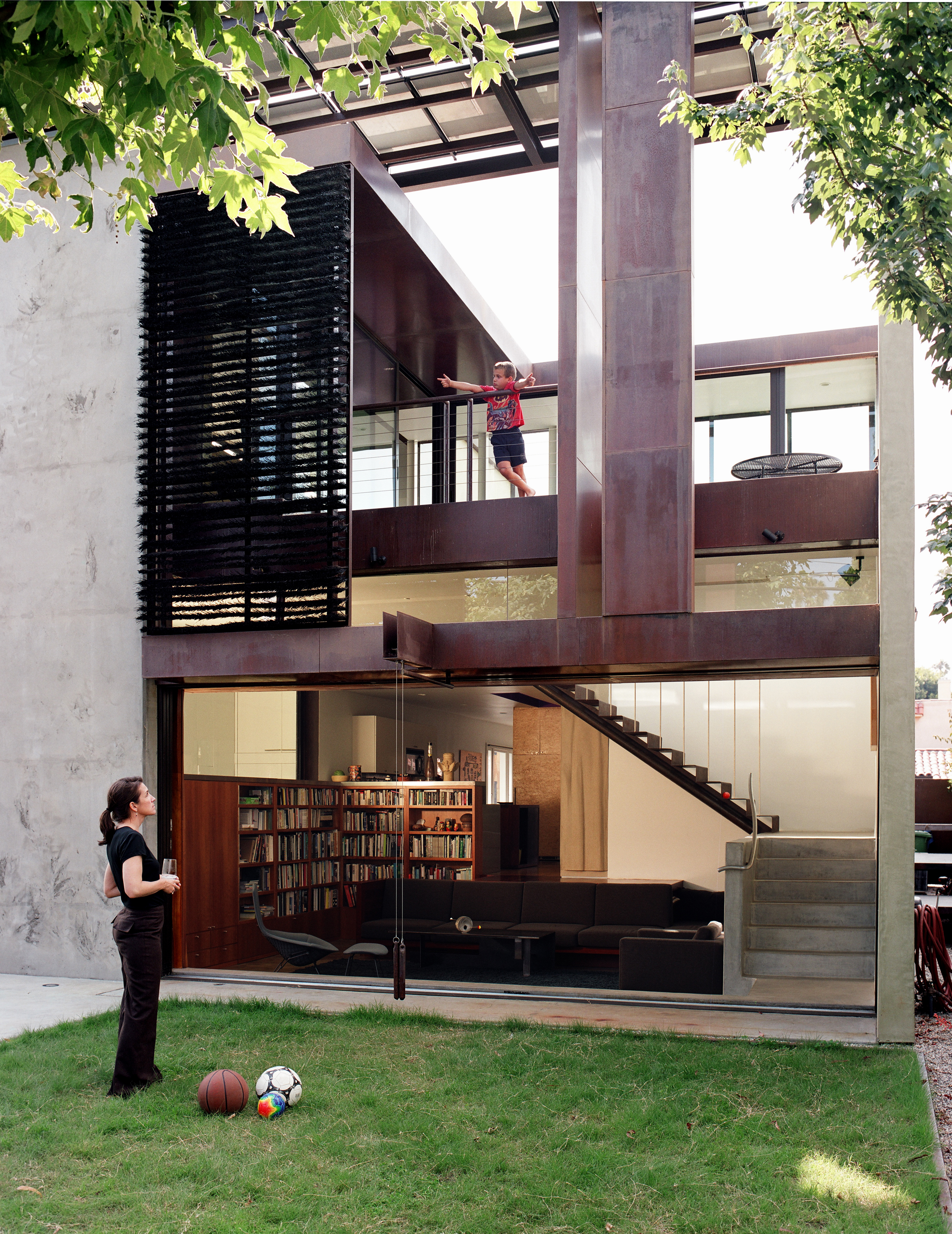
Solar Umbrella from the garden

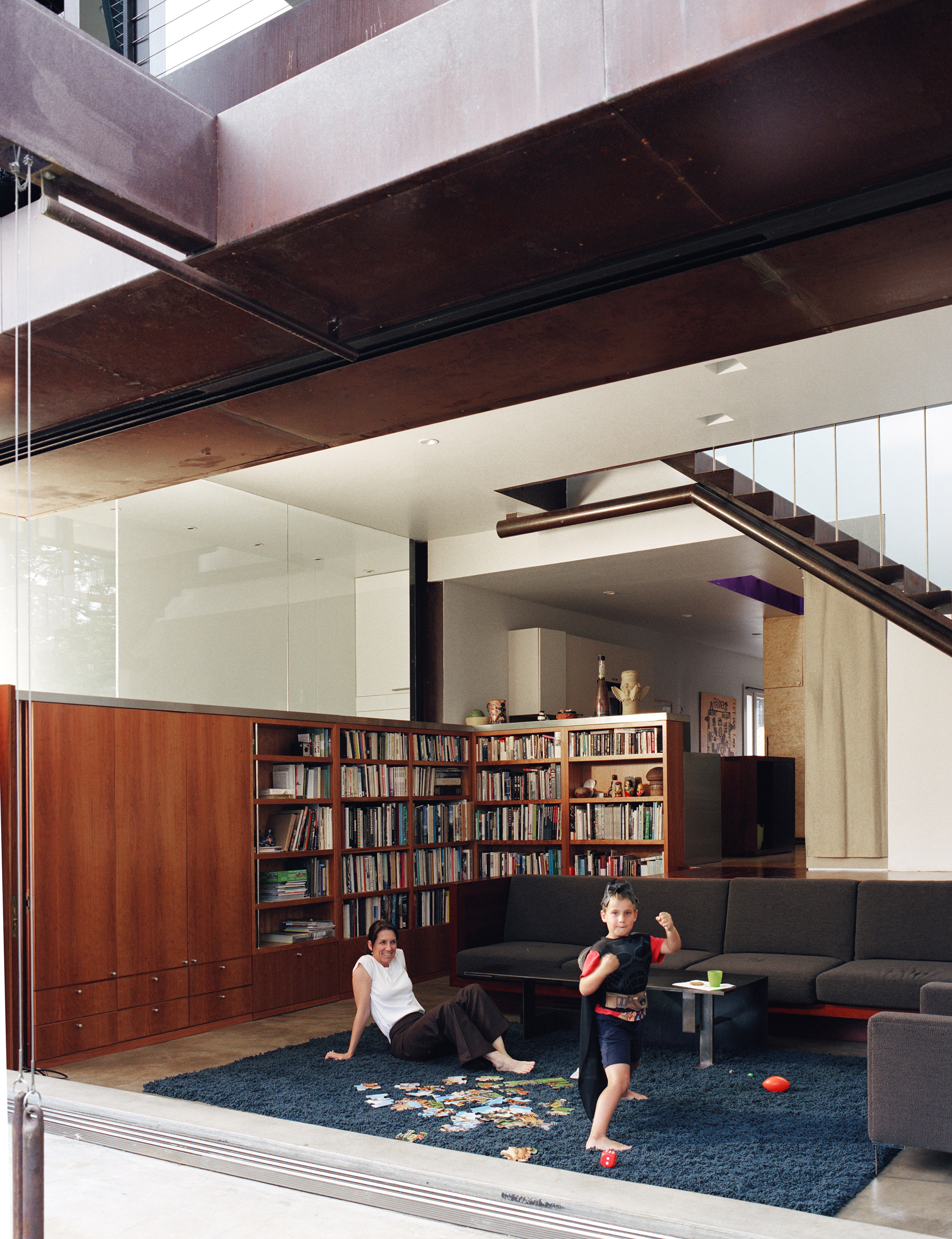
Living room

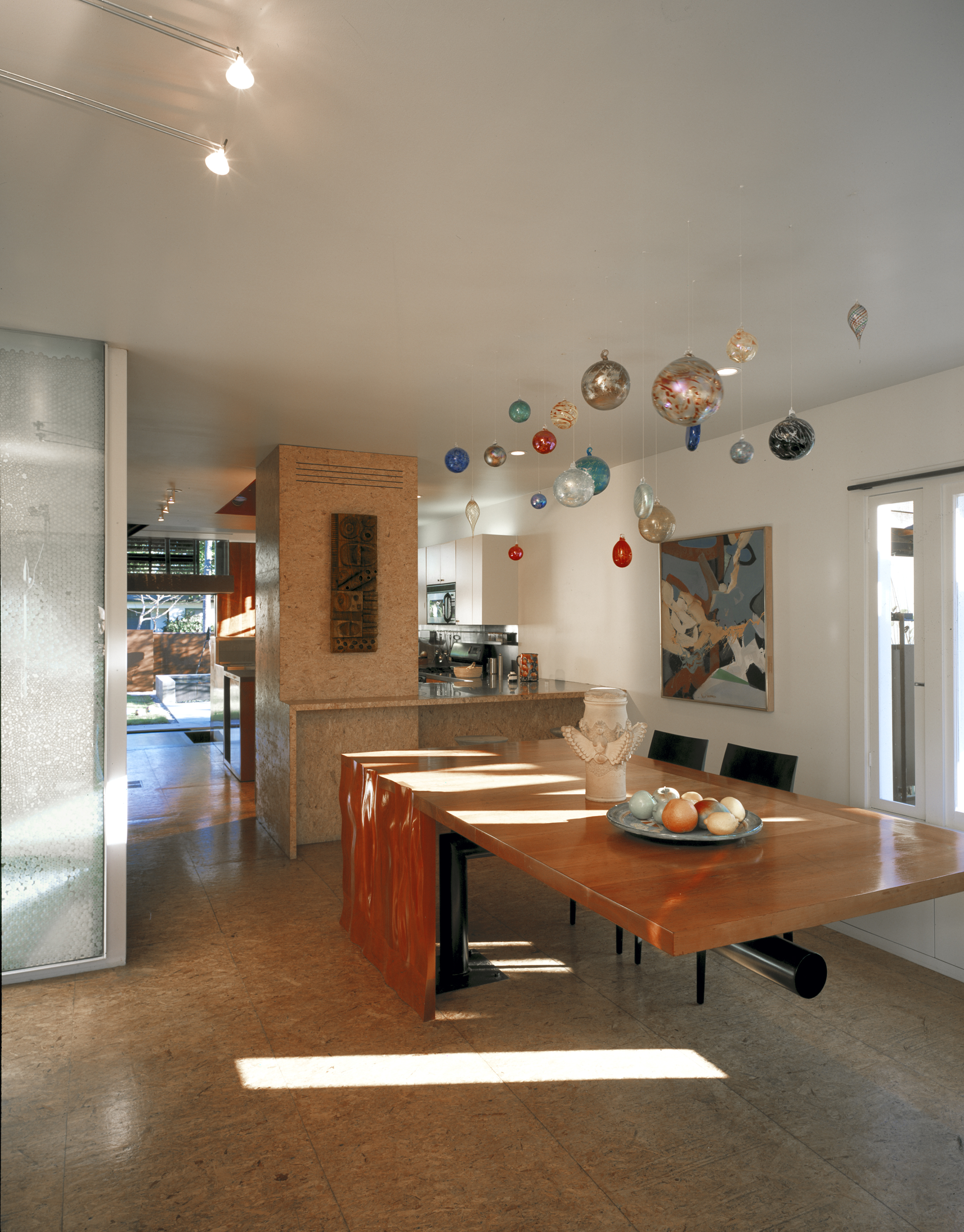
Dining room

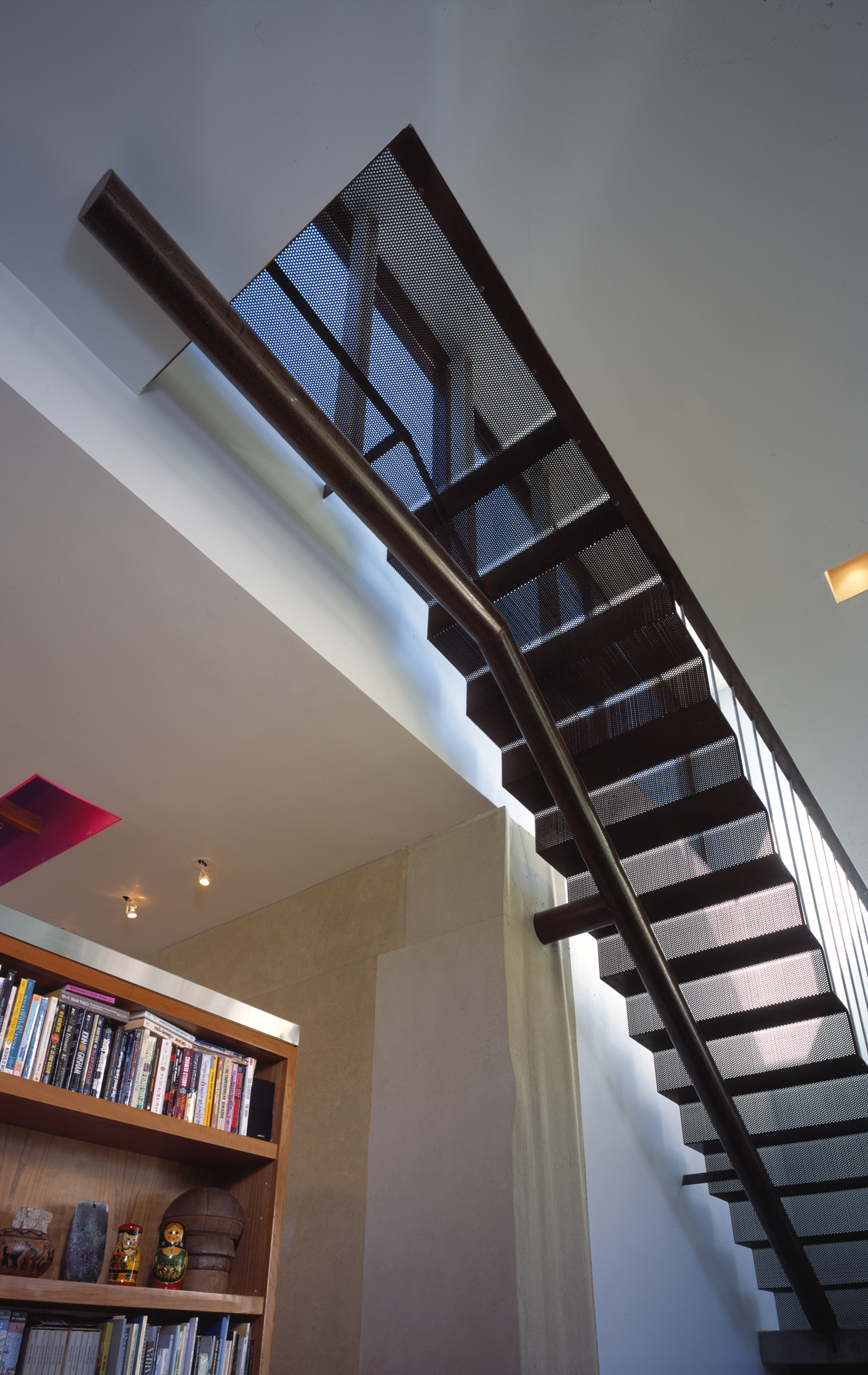
Stair

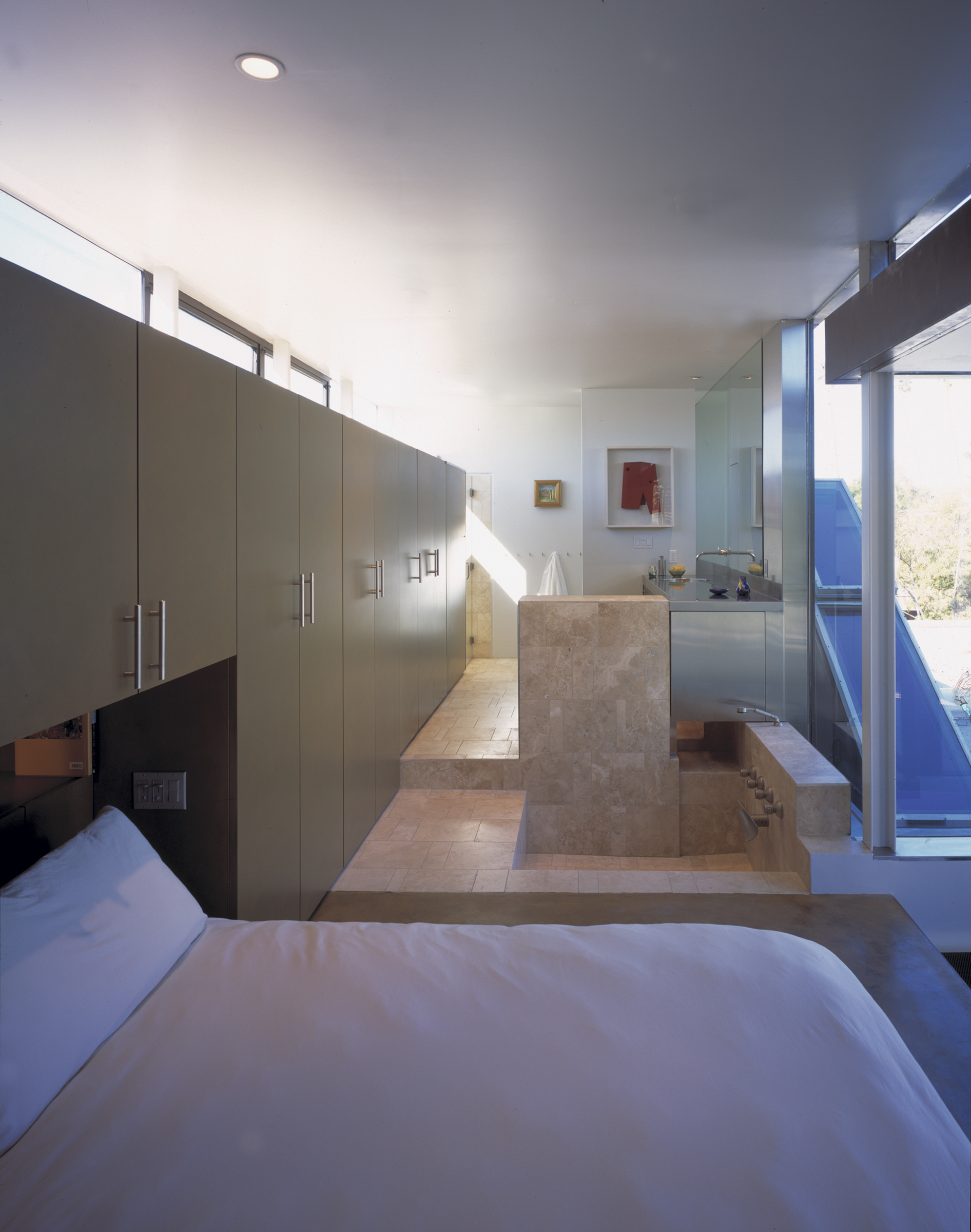
Master bedroom
