= AIA Gold Medal =

American award for architecture

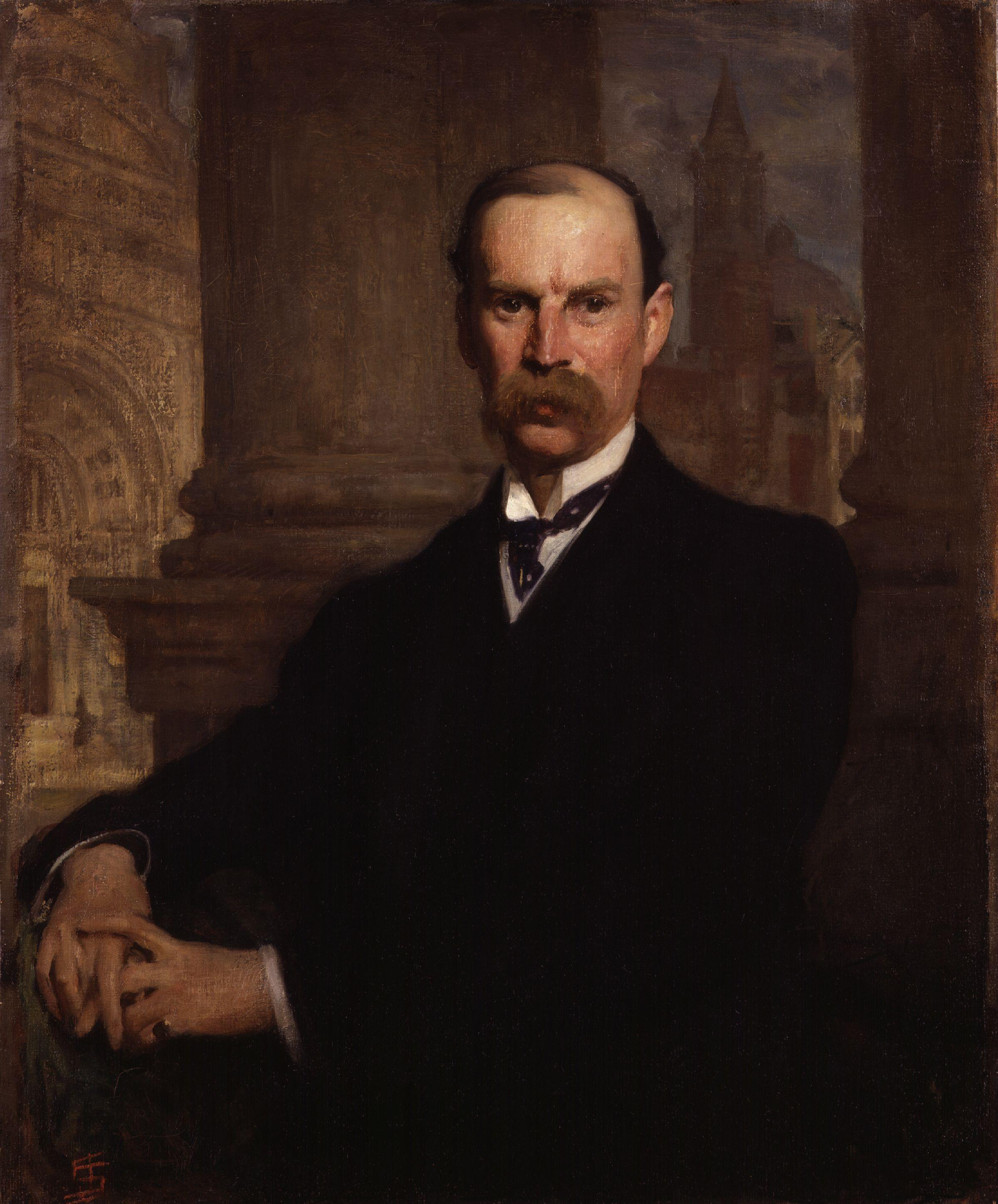
British architect Sir Aston Webb was the first recipient of the Gold Medal in 1907.

The AIA Gold Medal is awarded by the American Institute of Architects conferred "by the national AIA Board of Directors in recognition of a significant body of work of lasting influence on the theory and practice of architecture."

It is the Institute's highest award. The medal was established in 1907. Since 1947, the medal has been awarded more-or-less annually.

== List of AIA Gold Medal winners ==
- 2026: Shigeru Ban (Japan)
- 2025: Deborah Berke (U.S.)
- 2024: David Lake and Ted Flato of Lake Flato Architects (U.S.)
- 2023: Carol Ross Barney (U.S.)
- 2022: Angela Brooks and Lawrence Scarpa (U.S.)
- 2021: Edward Mazria (U.S.)
- 2020: Marlon Blackwell (U.S.)
- 2019: Richard Rogers (UK)
- 2018: James Stewart Polshek (U.S.)
- 2017: Paul Revere Williams (posthumous) (U.S.) (first African American to receive the honor)
- 2016: Robert Venturi and Denise Scott Brown (U.S.)
- 2015: Moshe Safdie (U.S., Israel, Canada)
- 2014: Julia Morgan (posthumous) (U.S.) (first woman to receive the honor)
- 2013: Thom Mayne (U.S.)
- 2012: Steven Holl (U.S.)
- 2011: Fumihiko Maki (Japan)
- 2010: Peter Bohlin (U.S.)
- 2009: Glenn Murcutt (Australia)
- 2008: Renzo Piano (Italy)
- 2007: Edward Larrabee Barnes (posthumous) (U.S.)
- 2006: Antoine Predock (U.S.)
- 2005: Santiago Calatrava (Spain, Switzerland)
- 2004: Samuel Mockbee (posthumous) (U.S.)
- 2003: (no award)
- 2002: Tadao Ando (Japan)
- 2001: Michael Graves (U.S.)
- 2000: Ricardo Legorreta (Mexico)
- 1999: Frank Gehry (Canada-U.S.)
- 1998: (no award)
- 1997: Richard Meier (U.S.)
- 1996: (no award)
- 1995: César Pelli (Argentina)
- 1994: Sir Norman Foster (UK)
- 1993: Thomas Jefferson (posthumous) (U.S.)
- 1993: Kevin Roche (U.S.)
- 1992: Benjamin C. Thompson (U.S.)
- 1991: Charles Willard Moore (U.S.)
- 1990: E. Fay Jones (U.S.)
- 1989: Joseph Esherick (U.S.)
- 1988: (no award)
- 1987: (no award)
- 1986: Arthur Charles Erickson (Canada)
- 1985: William Wayne Caudill (posthumous) (U.S.)
- 1984: (no award)
- 1983: Nathaniel Alexander Owings (U.S.)
- 1982: Romaldo Giurgola (Italy-U.S.)
- 1981: Josep Lluís Sert (Spain)
- 1980: (no award)
- 1979: Ieoh Ming Pei (U.S.)
- 1978: Philip Cortelyou Johnson (U.S.)
- 1977: Richard Joseph Neutra (posthumous) (Austria-U.S.)
- 1976: (no award)
- 1975: (no award)
- 1974: (no award)
- 1973: (no award)
- 1972: Pietro Belluschi (Italy-U.S.)
- 1971: Louis I. Kahn (U.S.)
- 1970: Richard Buckminster Fuller (U.S.)
- 1969: William Wilson Wurster (U.S.)
- 1968: Marcel Lajos Breuer (Hungary-U.S.)
- 1967: Wallace Kirkman Harrison (U.S.)
- 1966: Kenzo Tange (Japan)
- 1965: (no award)
- 1964: Pier Luigi Nervi (Italy)
- 1963: Alvar Aalto (Finland)
- 1962: Eero Saarinen (posthumous) (Finland-U.S.)
- 1961: Le Corbusier (France-Switzerland)
- 1960: Ludwig Mies van der Rohe (Germany-U.S.)
- 1959: Walter Adolph Gropius (Germany-U.S.)
- 1958: John Wellborn Root (Posthumous) (U.S.)
- 1957: Ralph Walker (U.S.) (Awarded as the Centennial Medal of Honor)
- 1957: Louis Skidmore (U.S.)
- 1956: Clarence S. Stein (U.S.)
- 1955: William Marinus Dudok (The Netherlands)
- 1954: (no award)
- 1953: William Adams Delano (U.S.)
- 1952: Auguste Perret (France)
- 1951: Bernard Ralph Maybeck (U.S.)
- 1950: Sir Patrick Abercrombie (UK)
- 1949: Frank Lloyd Wright (U.S.)
- 1948: Charles Donagh Maginnis
- 1947: Eliel Saarinen (Finland-U.S.)
- 1944: Louis Henri Sullivan (posthumous) (U.S.)
- 1938: Paul Philippe Cret (France-U.S.)
- 1933: Ragnar Östberg (Sweden)
- 1929: Milton Bennett Medary (U.S.)
- 1927: Howard Van Doren Shaw (U.S.)
- 1925: Sir Edwin Landseer Lutyens (U.K.)
- 1925: Bertram Grosvenor Goodhue (U.S.)
- 1923: Henry Bacon (U.S.)
- 1922: Victor Laloux (France)
- 1920: Egerton Swartwout (U.S.)
- 1914: Jean-Louis Pascal (France)
- 1911: George Browne Post (U.S.)
- 1909: Charles Follen McKim (posthumous) (U.S.)
- 1907: Sir Aston Webb (U.K.) (first man to receive the honor)

== See also ==
- Fellow of the American Institute of Architects
- Gold medal

== Sources ==
- Wilson, Richard Guy, ed. (1984). The AIA Gold Medal. New York City, New York, USA: McGraw-Hill. ISBN 978-0-07-070810-5.
