= Colorado Court Housing =

Housing project in Santa Monica, California, US

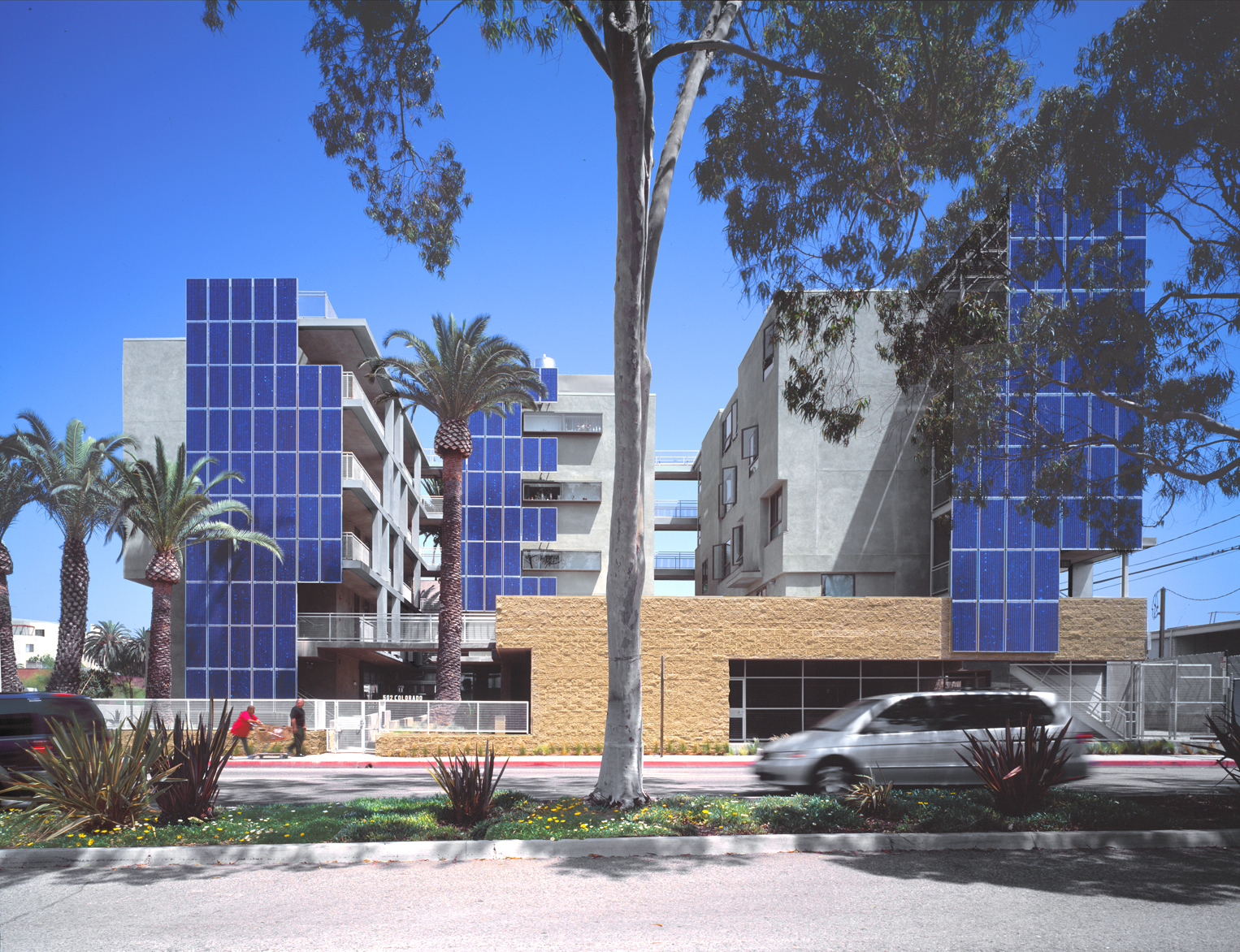
Colorado Court Housing, Santa Monica, California

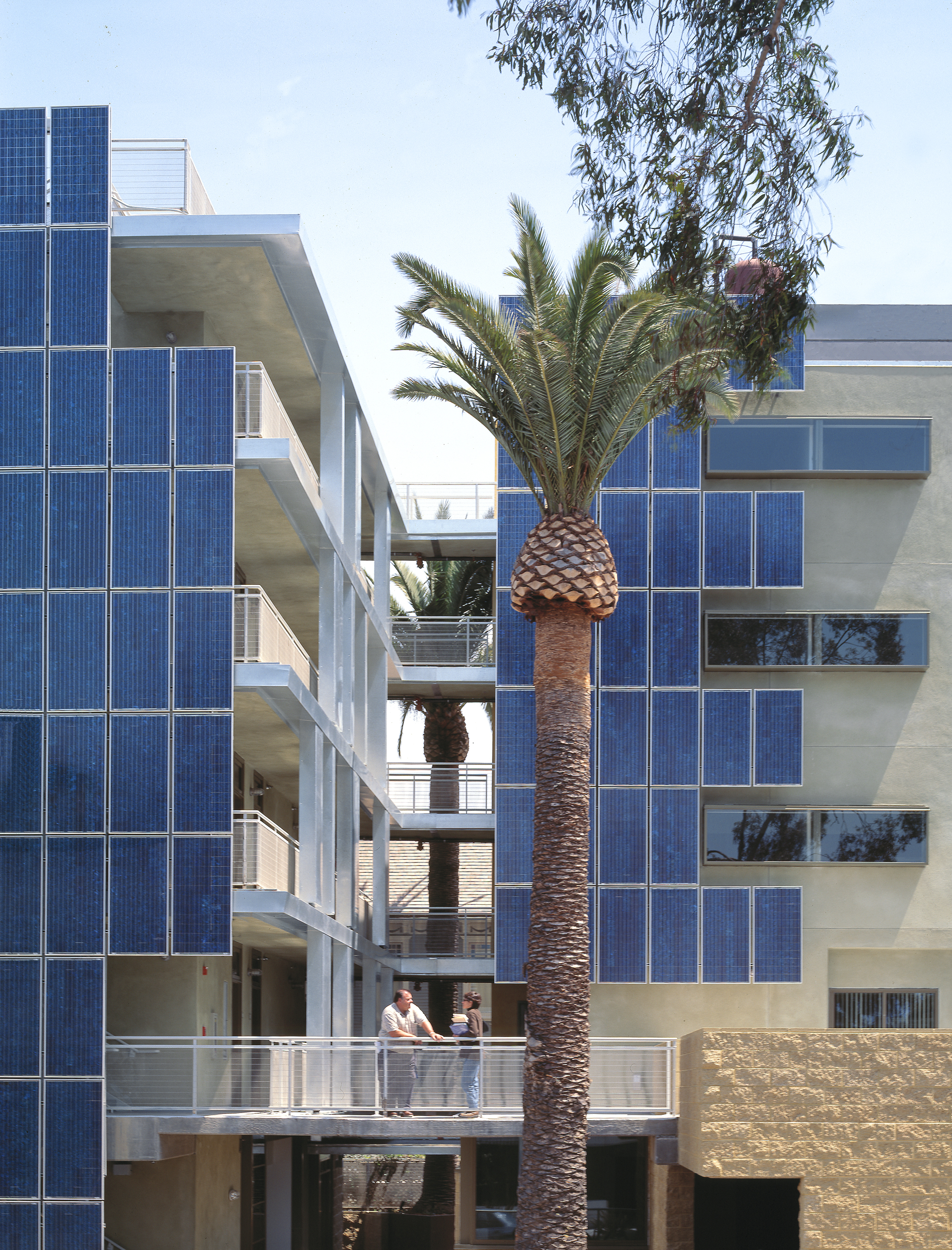
Colorado Court solar panels at entry

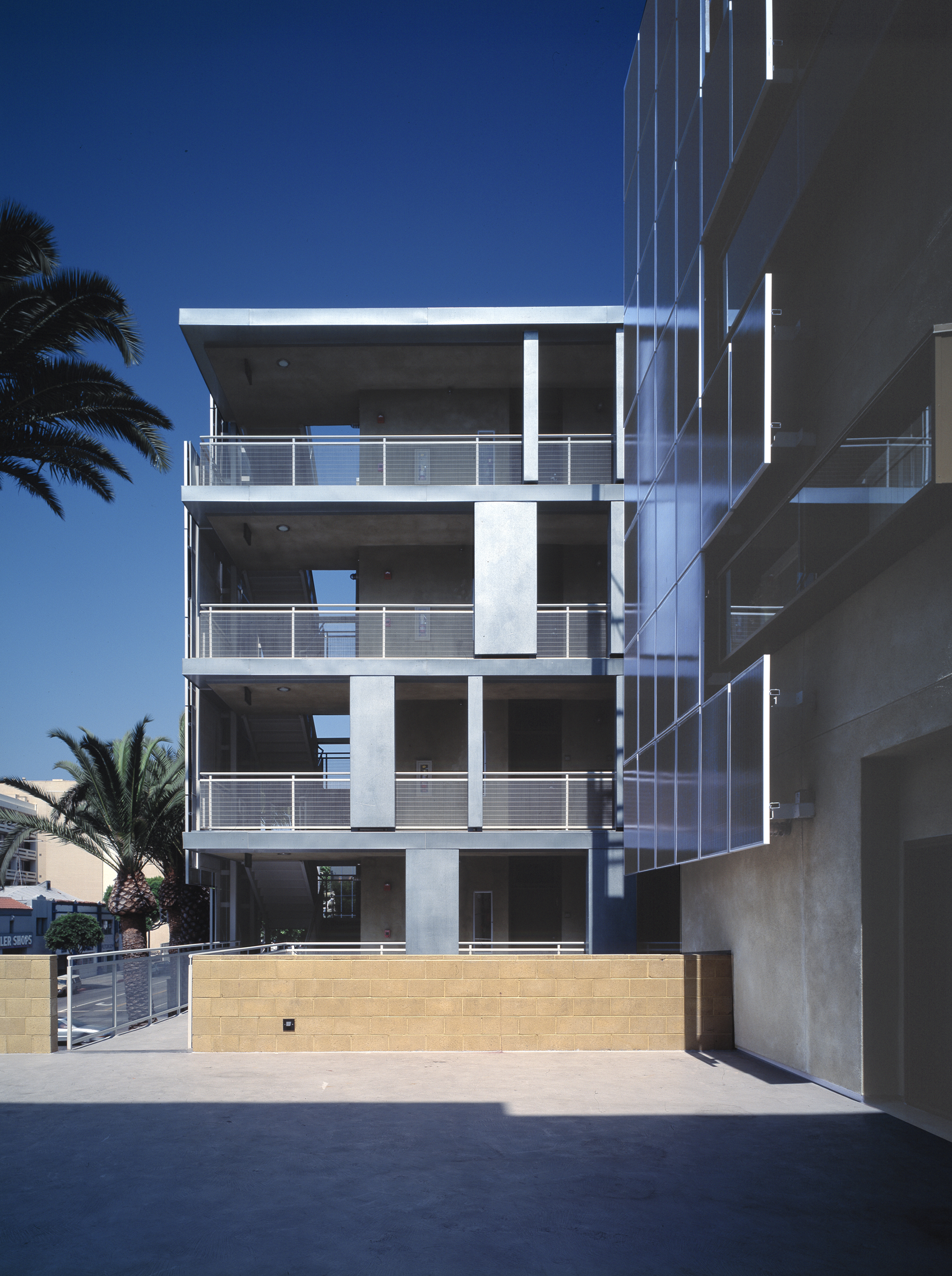
Colorado Court south shading

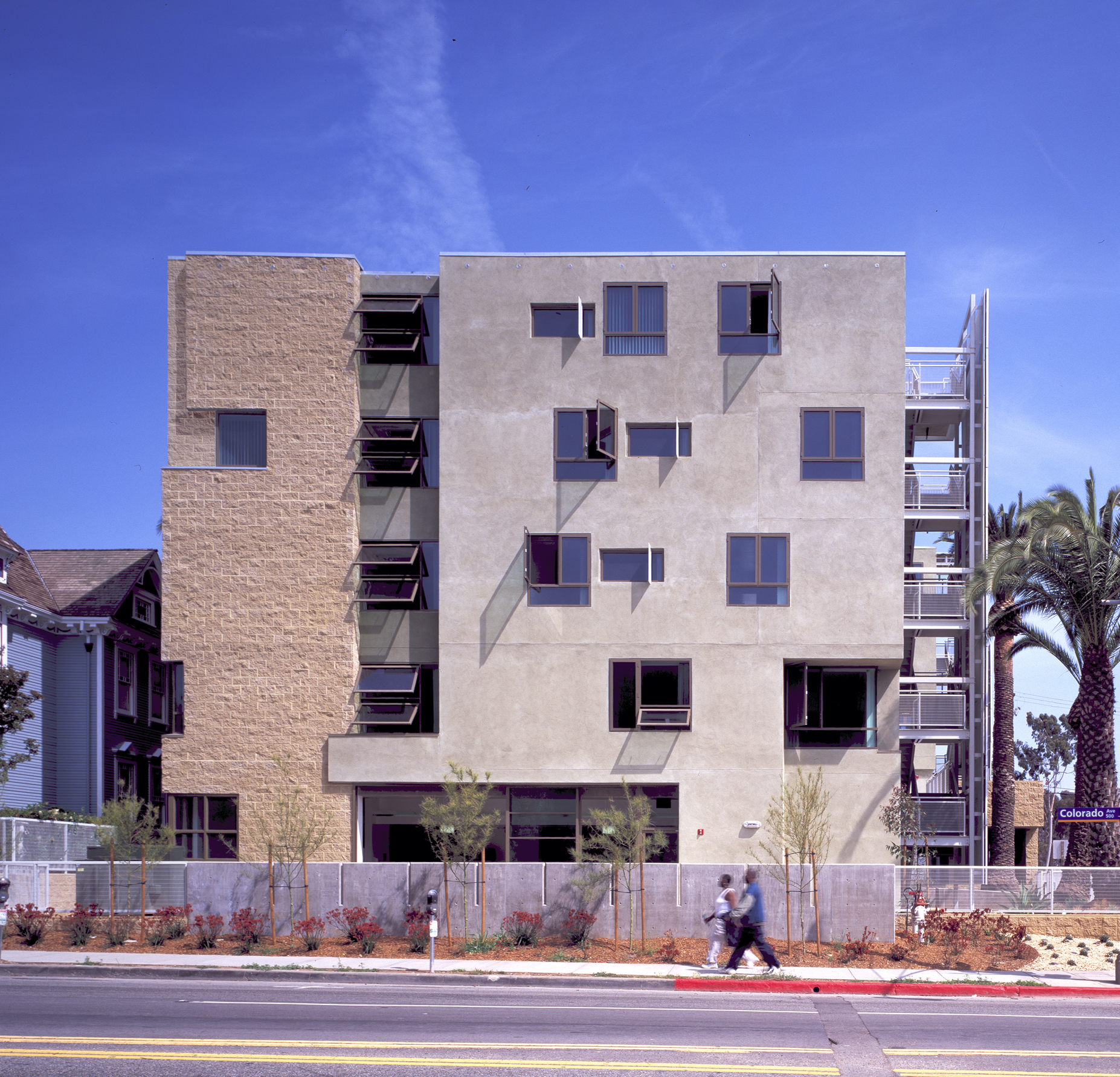
Colorado Court north facade

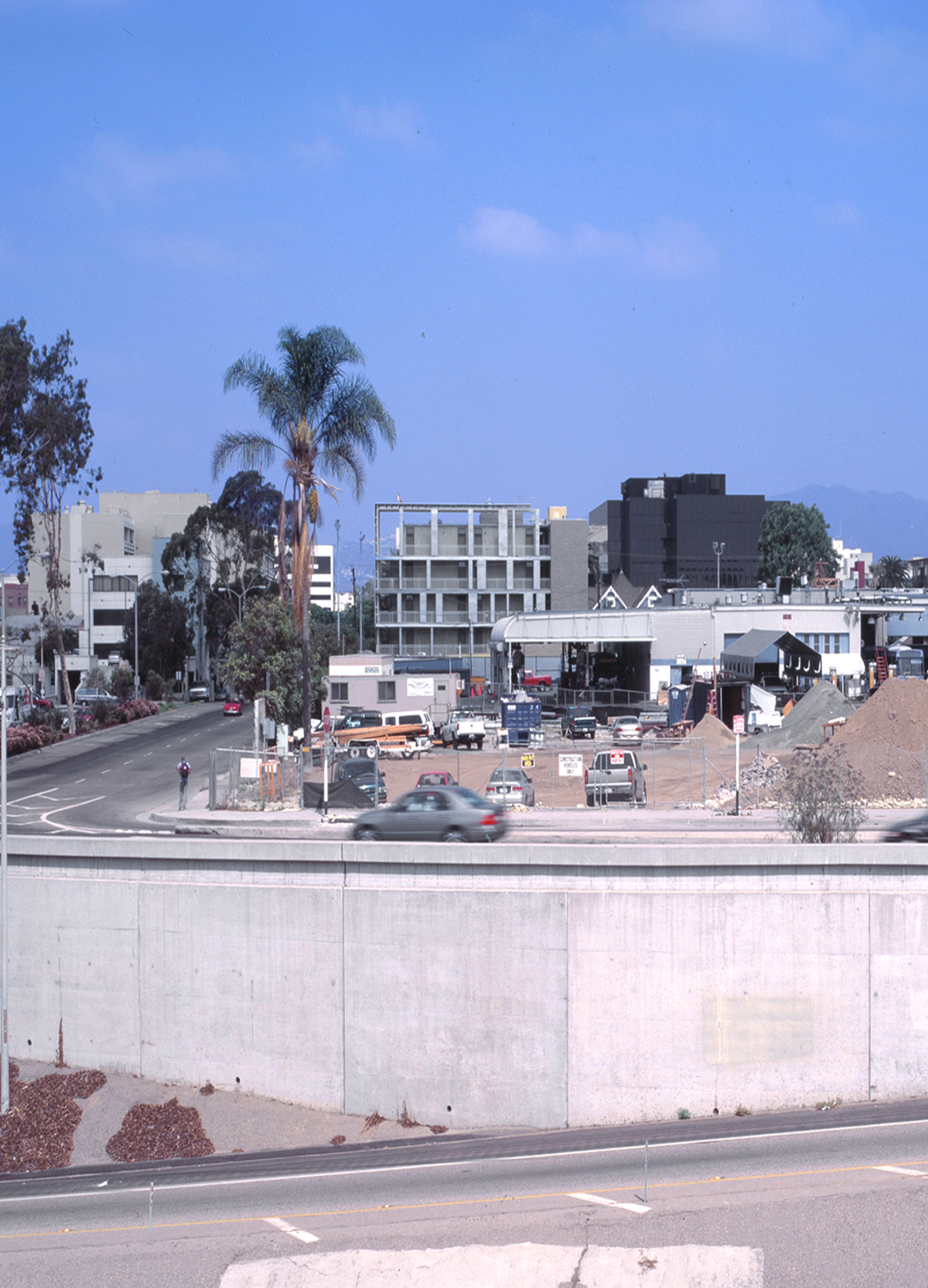
Colorado Court from Santa Monica Freeway

Colorado Court Housing is a 44-unit housing project designed by the architectural firm Pugh + Scarpa. Colorado Court is the first United States Green Building Council (USGBC) "LEED" certified multi-family housing project, achieving "Gold" certification. Located at the corner of a main offramp of the Santa Monica freeway, Colorado Court's highly visible position makes it gateway to the city of Santa Monica, California. The 44-unit, five-story building is the first affordable-housing project the United States to be LEED certified and is nearly 100% energy neutral (Colorado Court Movie Clip). This project is an excellent model of sustainable development in an urban environment, provides a model for private/public partnerships benefit the community, and promotes diversity in an urban environment through strategically placed affordable housing.

Careful attention to the placement and siting of the building has created natural ventilation system. The building's location, orientation, and shape take into account prevailing winds and exposure to the sun . As a result, only one small section of the office space on the ground floor is equipped with air conditioning . The design of windows further maximizes both ventilation and light levels; for example, special attention was paid to shading and window glazes to mediate southern and western exposures.

== Building data ==
- Location: Santa Monica, CA, USA
- Building type(s): Multi-unit residential, Special needs housing, New construction, 30,200 sq. feet (2,800 sq. meters)
- Project scope: 5-story building, Urban setting
- Completed November 2002
- Rating: U.S. Green Building Council LEED-NC, v2—Level: Gold (44 points)

== Environmental aspects ==
Innovative sustainable energy technologies developed for Colorado Court include natural gas turbine cogeneration system that generates the base electrical load and provides the building's hot water needs. Photovoltaics integrated into the facade and roof supply most of the peak-load energy demand. Unused energy from these solar panels is fed into the grid during daytime hours and retrieved from the grid at night as needed. The "green electricity" produced at the building site releases no pollutants into the environment. Prevailing breezes cool the building, which has no air conditioning.

The building also collects rainwater runoff from the entire city block behind the property funnels it into a series of underground chambers. The water slowly percolates back into soil, which filters the pollutants from the water while preventing contaminated water spilling into Santa Monica Bay.

== Energy ==
The building is sited for climate responsive, passive solar design. The building has three arms that reach out to the prevailing breezes, inducing cross ventilation through every unit. It is organized so that over 90% of the glazing is on the north and south facades. The south facade is shaded by a series of abstract fins and solar panels.

The building produces on-site electricity through a combination of solar panels and a natural-gas fired micro turbine. These two on-site electricity-generating systems, have the capacity to meet 100% of the building's electricity consumption. The utility grid serves as a buffer to smooth out any mismatch between building demand and site generation supply. Waste heat from the operation of the micro turbine is employed to generate hot water for domestic use and for space heating via a hydronic radiator heating system.

The units are kept cool with a combination of window placement for cross ventilation; double-glazed, krypton-filled, low-e windows with stainless steel spacers; and blown-in recycled cellulose insulation that boosts the thermal value of the wall to 75% above a conventional, type-five wall and reduces envelope infiltration. Building appliances are highly efficient. The specially selected refrigerators consume only 1 kWh per day per unit. Light switches employ motion sensors to avoid wasting energy indoors and outdoors and compact fluorescent lights are used throughout the building.

== Awards and honors ==
- 2004 Exhibit at the National Building Museum, Washington, DC
- 2003 National AIA Honor Award for Design Excellence
- 2003 National AIA “COTE” Top Ten Green Building Award
- 2003 National AIA PIA Award for Design Excellence
- 2003 AIACC Honor Awards for Design Excellence
- 2003 LA/AIA Honor Awards for Design Excellence
- 2003 Rudy Bruner Award for Urban Excellence, Silver Medal
- 2002 BHS&F World Habitat Award Finalist
- 2001 Westside Prize for Urban Design
